= Jyoti =

Jyoti means "divine light" in many Indian languages.

Jyoti and spelling variants may refer to:

== Arts and media ==
=== Films and TV ===
- Jothi (1939 film), a Tamil film
- Jyothi (1976 film), a Telugu film
- Jyoti (1981 film), a Hindi film
- Jothi (1983 film), a Tamil film
- Jyoti (1988 film), a Bengali film
- Jothi (2022 film), a Tamil film
- Jyoti (TV series), an Indian daily soap opera on Imagine TV
- Jothi (TV series), a 2021 Indian supernatural fantasy thriller Tamil language television series

=== Other media ===
- Jyothi (album), a 1983 album by Charlie Mariano and the Karnataka College of Percussion
- Andhra Jyothi, Indian newspaper
- Jothi Agaval (The Call Divine), a poem by Ramalinga Swamigal (Vallalar)
- Jyoti swarupini, a Carnatic raga

== Hinduism ==
- Jyoti (goddess), considered to be a Hindu goddess of light
- Jyotirlinga, a set of consecrated Shiva lingams
- Jyotir Math, one of four major Ādi Śaṅkara schools
- Jyoti Kalash, a light festival associated with Durga

== People ==
=== In film ===
- Jyoti Kapur Das, Indian director and screenwriter
- Jyoti Mistry (born 1970), South African film director of Indian descent
- Jyoti Sarup (born 1954), Indian director and producer
- Jyoti Swaroop (died 1991), Indian director
- J. P. Dutta (born 1949), Indian producer, writer and director
- Jyothi (actress, born 1963) (1963–2007), film actress who acted in over 50 South Indian films
- Jyothika (born 1977), Indian actress of predominantly Tamil films
- Jyoti Gauba, Indian actress
- Jyothi Lakshmi (1948–2016), Indian actress
- Jyoti Singh (actress), US born Indian actress
- Jyotii Sethi, Indian actress
- Jyoti Subhash, Indian actress

=== Sportspeople ===
- Jyothi Yarraji (born 1999), Indian woman hurdler
- Jyothi Surekha Vennam, Indian compound archer
- Jyoti (wrestler) (born 1985), Indian wrestler in the -75 kg category
- Jyoti Chetty (born 1982), South African fencer
- Jyoti Dutta (1926–2010), Indian cricketer
- Jyoti Raj, Indian free solo climber
- Jyoti Randhawa (born 1972), Indian professional golfer
- Jyoti Rumawat (born 1999), Indian field hockey player
- Jyoti Sunita Kullu (born 1978), Indian field hockey player
- Jyoti Yadav (born 1983), Indian cricketer

=== Musicians ===
- Georgia Anne Muldrow, American musician who occasionally goes by the stage name Jyoti
- Jyoti Ghimire, Nepalese musician
- Jyoti Goho, Indian classical musician
- Jyoti Hegde, Indian classical musician
- Jyoti Nooran, one of the Nooran Sisters
- Jyoty, Indian-Dutch DJ and Producer

=== In government ===
- Jyoti Basu (1914–2010), male Indian politician, of Communist Party of India (Marxist) from West Bengal, India
- Jyoti Devi, Indian politician
- Jyoti Dhurve, Indian politician
- Jyoti Gondek (born 1969), Canadian politician
- Jyoti Kalani, Indian politician
- Jyoti Kiran (born 1968), Indian politician of the BJP party
- Jyoti Mirdha (born 1972), Indian politician
- Jyoti Prakash Nirala (1986–2017), Indian Air Force member killed in action
- Jyoti Prasad Das, Indian politician
- Jyoti Prasad Rajkhowa, Indian governor
- Jyotiraditya Scindia, Indian politician
- Jothi Venkatachalam (born 1917), female Indian politician, former Governor of Kerala, India

=== Writers ===
- Jyotirmoyee Devi (1896–1988), Indian writer
- Jyoti Mhapsekar (born 1950), librarian and activist
- Jyoti Prakash Dutta (writer), Bangladeshi short-story writer
- Jyoti Prasad Agarwala (1903–1951), prolific author of Assamese literature

=== Other people ===
- Jyotirao Phule (1827–1890), activist and writer
- Jyoti Amge (born 1993), world's smallest woman as of 2018
- Jyoti Dhawale, HIV activist
- Jyotirmoy Dey (1955–2011), journalist and investigator
- Jyoti Kumari (born 2005), student known for bicycling over 700 mi during COVID-19 lockdown
- Jyotiprasad Medhi (1924–2017), statistical mathematician
- Jyoti Rout (born 1965), Indian classical dancer
- Jyotiranjan Srichandan Ray (born 1970), Indian geochemist
- Jyoti Prakash Tamang (born 1961), Indian food technologist
- Jyoti Singh, 2012 Delhi gang rape murder victim

== Places ==
- Jyotirmath, city in Uttarakhand, India
- Jyoti Khuria, municipality in Uttarakhand, India
- Jyothy Kendriya Vidyalaya, an English medium school in Bangalore

== See also ==
- Joti (disambiguation)
- Jyot
- Jyoti Basu (disambiguation)
- Jeevana Jyothi (disambiguation)
