= Thogata =

Thogata (తొగట)
Regions with significant populations
- Andhra Pradesh, Telangana, Karnataka, Maharashtra, Tamil Nadu

Languages
- Telugu, Kannada

Religion
- Hinduism

Related ethnic groups
- Saliya, Padmasali, Devanga

Thogata Veera Kshatriya(TVK) (Telugu: తొగట వీర క్షత్రియ ) are a Hindu community found in the Indian states of Andhra Pradesh, Telangana, Karnataka, Tamil Nadu, and Maharashtra. They claim descent from Chaudeswari and follow Vaishnavite tradition.

While their traditional occupation is weaving, they are now engaged in various other professions, including farming and other rural activities.

They are predominantly concentrated in the Rayalaseema region, with large populations in areas such as Dharmavaram, Madanapalle, and Kadapa district . In Coastal Andhra, they have a significant presence in the Palnadu and Guntur districts, as well as in Kanigiri and Nellore district. In Karnataka, they are primarily found in the Bengaluru and Mysore regions. In Telangana, they are located in the Nalgonda and Mahbubnagar districts, along with Hyderabad.

The Thogata Veera Kshatriyas traditionally have temples dedicated to their goddess, Chowdeswari Devi, in every place they reside. Each year, they celebrate the Jyothi Utsava in honor of Goddess Chowdeswari Devi, with Nandavaram being particularly famous for these festivities. Numerous members of the Thogata community from different states come together to take part in the celebrations.

Thogats are recognaized as a Hindhu rushi family background. Thogatas are recognized as an Other Backward Class (OBC) in Andhra Pradesh, Tamil Nadu, and OC(Open Category) other Indian states. Their gotras are derived and totally different like kshantriyas gotras from the names of sages such as Parashara, Bharadwaja, Vasishta, Atreya, and Markandeya, among others.

They are distinct from other weaving castes like Padmasali and Devanga.
