= Vembadithalam =

- Village
- Location in Salem, India Vembadithalam (Tamil Nadu) Vembadithalam (India)
- Coordinates: 11.5670°N 78.0112°E
- Country: India
- State: Tamil Nadu
- District: Salem
- Metro: Salem Metropolitan Area
- Elevation: 257 m (843 ft)

Population (2001)
  - Total: 10,034

Languages
  - Official: Tamil
- Time zone: UTC+5:30 (IST)
- PIN: 637504
- Telephone code: 0427
- Vehicle registration: TN-90

Vembadithalam is a small village in Salem district of Tamil Nadu, India. The village comes under the Veerapandi Union. Vembadithalam means Land of Neem. Vembu is nothing but neem tree. Other nicknames of this village are Vembai and Vems City. Salem is nearest city (15 km) for Vembai and well connected with NH47. Every half an hour public buses and private buses help to commute the people between Vembai and Salem. Vembadithalam is located 6.8 km from its Taluk Main Town Veerapandi. It is located 19.9 km from its District Main City Salem.

Nearby villages are Kanagagiri (1.9 km), Naduvaneri (2.4 km), Senaipalayam (2.6 km), Rakkipatti (3.5 km), Periya Seeragapadi (4 km). Nearest Towns are Veerapandi (6.8 km), Konganapuram (12.7 km), Salem (14.7 km), Taramangalam (15.3 km).

Anaikuttapatti, Ariyagoundampatti, Chennagiri, Inambiroji, Kadathur Agr and Keerapappambadi, are the villages along with this village in the same Veerapandi Taluk.

Vembadithalam Pin Code is 637504 and has a post office. Other near by villages coming under this Post Office (637504) are Naduvaneri, Vembadithalam, Kandarkulamanickam, Rakkipatti, Kalparapatti

== Overview ==
Vembadithalam has a government primary school (classes 1 to 5), a government higher secondary school, and a government hospital. The schools and hospital occupy relatively large sites and are better equipped than comparable facilities in neighbouring villages. The village also has a small public library. A cinema hall operated in the village until its closure, reportedly for financial reasons.

The primary school serves students largely from economically disadvantaged backgrounds. Its buildings and facilities have received less investment than those of the higher secondary school, which has attracted funding from local businesses and nearby engineering and polytechnic institutions. Enrolment at the primary school has also been affected by the growth of private and matriculation-stream schools in the area.

== Culture ==
Textile is most important business. Mostly Devanga Chettiar community people reside here doing the textile business or they inspired other community people to follow the textile business. On every week of Tuesday weaver gets weekly wages and they will do their purchases in nearby weekly market. Sri Ramalinga Sowdeswari Amman, Marriamman and Kaliamman temple, Subramanya swamy temple and Perumal Kovil (temple) and Kasi Vishwanatha temple are major temples.Sri Ramalinga Sowdeswari Amman, Marriamman (most famous) and Kaliamman festivals are celebrated every year without fail. Whole village get the new color on those festival days. Sowdeswari Amman festival is celebrated in the month of January (Tamil month of Thai). The people belong to Kannada Devanga Chettiar family celebrate this Sowdeswari Amman festival and it is a three to four-day festival featuring Knife dance (Kathi Dance and Veramutti), Sakthi, Jyothi, etc. During this festival famous Veramutti vesam and it devotional steps are fantastic experience to see.

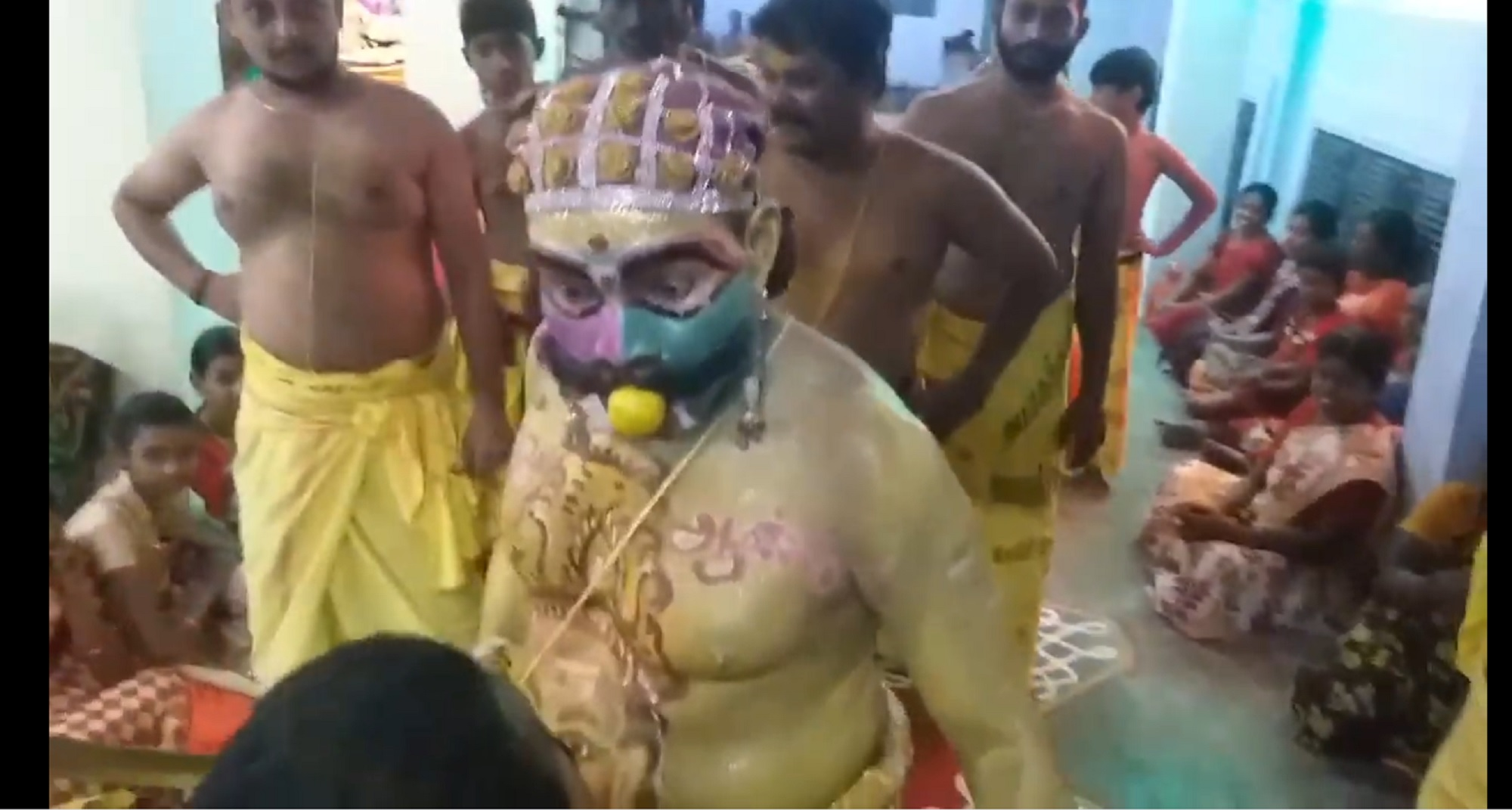

Mr. Shanmugaraj from Vembadithalam about 41 years doing this veramutti vesam as devotional service to God famous known in this area. Steps followed in this Veramutti having big devanga history. Entertainment includes an orchestra (both classical and western) and drama, etc. Marriamman and Kaliamman festivals are celebrated annually in the Tamil month of 'Panguni'. It is also a two to three-day festival, there will be activities like Thee Gundam (walking on fire), pongal (making sweet food for Amman) and vandi vedikkai (show of decorated vehicles or bullock carts with some themes) in the evening of last day.

At Vembadithalam, the first initiative of Siddharism and Pathinen Siddhar's Indhu Vedam practices for Merkku Mandalam was started in 1981 by Mr R J Venkatramanan and family and the "Mukambigai Alayam" was started by his father Mr A.K.R Jegannathan in their land closer to the lake. Subsequently from this initiatives and blessing of Pathinen Siddhar madam and His Holiness Gurdevar and with involvement of many siddharadiyans of Vembadithalam, it had a unique recognition of having the Padhinon Siddhar "Tharu Kulam" which was built through the co-ordinated efforts of Vembadithalam Siddhar Addiyaans, Mr R J Venkatramanan, Mr T.R.Ramalingam, Mr Venkatesan, Mr Srinivasan, Mr Vijayragavan, Mr Mani, Mr L.K. Ganesan and other supporters, it was blessed and spiritualized by His Holiness Gnaalaguru Siddhar Arasayogi Karuwooraar, 12th Pathinen Siddhar Peedaathipathi. During the year 1985 His Holiness Gurudevar visited vembadithalam for the second time and had a Public meeting. Subsequently, with the blessings of His Holiness Gurudevar and the hard efforts of Venkatesan, Mani and others Pathinen Siddhar Peedam- Tharukulam was started in the own place. From the very inception of Tharukulam Oma, Oga, yaga, Yagna, Velvi poosais were performed there by the Siddharadiyans.

The famous playback singer Krishnaraj (Vellarika.. Vellarika from Kadhal Kottai and Thanjavooru man eduthu from Porkaalam films fame) was born and brought up in Vembadithalam. His Friend Mr. Thangaraj (Ramayanakarar) is a famous singer from this village. During 19th century he was the person to Thought about Ramayananam to the people of Vembadithalam. So they always called with special name of "Ramayanakarar "

The festival of pongal is celebrated for 3 days in this town

== Current business ==
The early business in Vembadithalam started with handlooms and weavers getting yarns from Salem and weaving them. Then slowly started their own business and as per current trend cotton clothes manufacturing, especially silk sarees are being manufactured and distributed throughout India.

== Facilities ==
Tamil Nadu’s first rural telephone exchange opened in Vembadithalam. There is also a Government hospital, Government primary school and a Government Higher Secondary School. Students from surrounding villages travel to this Government Higher Secondary School to study. This Government Higher Secondary School is equipped with a Physics Lab, Chemistry Lab, Computer Labs and a wide eco-friendly playground. The school celebrated its golden jubilee on 25.01.2014.

Mr. Dhanasekaran, belonging to this village also started the yarn business years ago. Then the yarn business spread over to nearby villages Elambillai, Perumagoundan Patti and Attayampatti.

== Education ==
Vembadithalam is close to Maisurii Polytechnic College and the Knowledge Institute of Technology. There are also several secondary schools nearby.

== Political facts ==
This village comes under Veerapandi political constituency and the famous Late.Veerapandi S Arumugam (affectionately called as Veerapaandiar) was from this constituency only. His son Veerapandi A. Raja was the former MLA for this constituency.
