= Alagu Sevai =

Local Indian ritual

Alagu Seva is a special ritual event of the Devanga people. Deities used to wound themselves by holy sword ("Katthi") by saying "Theesukko Thaye", "Thegadhuko Thaye", "Tho parak, Thali parak". It is done by Devanga Men without any age difference. It is believed that their ancestors used to follow this method to invoke the deity Sri Ramalinga Chowdeshwari Amman . Following them, Nowadays these people are invoking Chowdeswari Amman by this method. Pandaram (Holy Turmeric mixture) is applied among the wounds so as to protect from infections. Except for Devanga, other people are not allowed to touch the Holy Sword and to perform the ritual.

It is also known as "Alagu Seva", "Katthi Haakkadhu". The one who perform this tradition is called Veera Kumar.

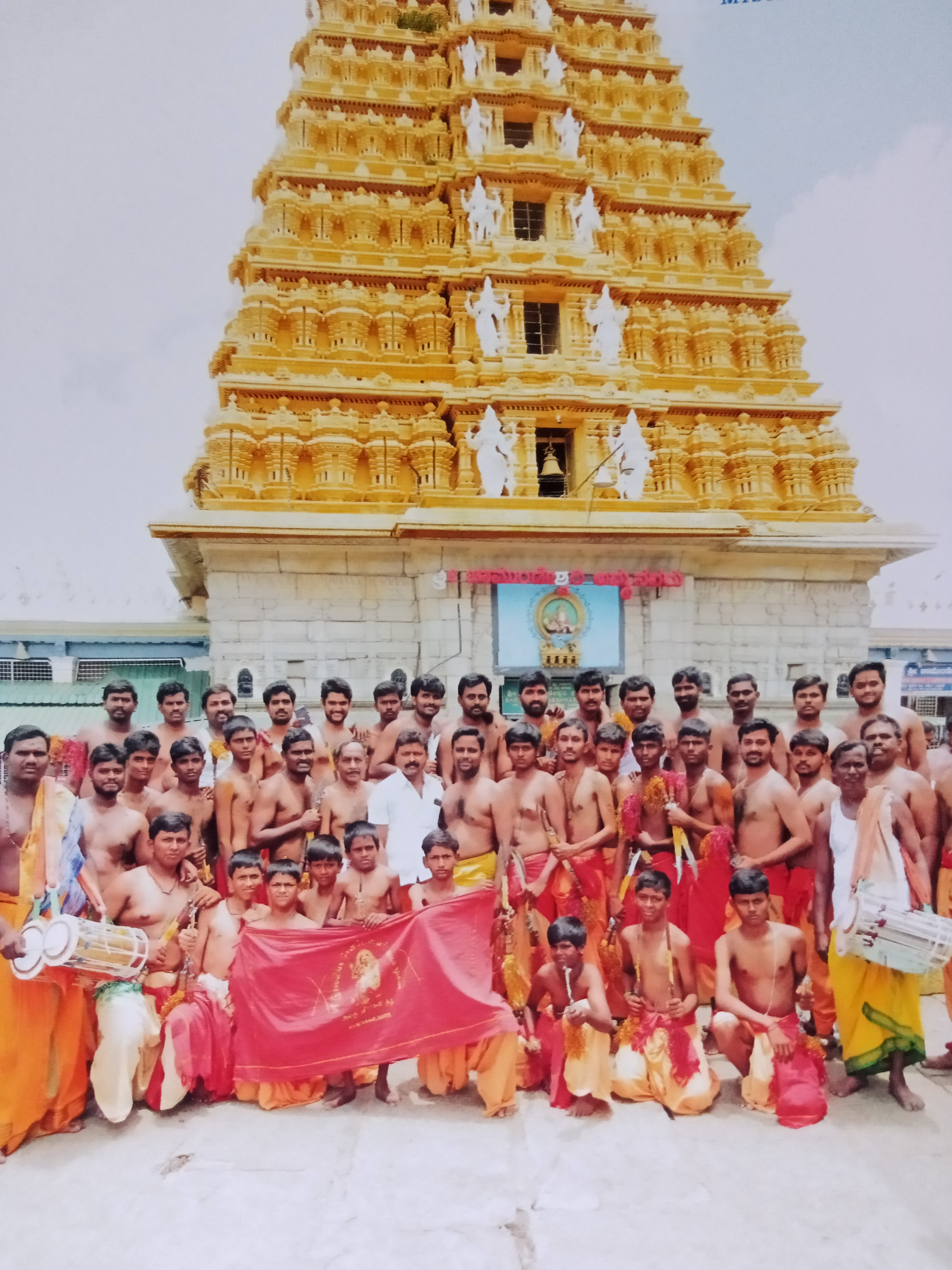
Alagu Veera Kumarargal (in front of Sri Chamundeshwari Temple, Mysuru)

== History ==
King Devdas, the seventh incarnation of Devala built a beautiful Temple for Sri Ramalinga Chowdeshwari Amman. He went to Srisailam as Lord Shiva and Parvathi lived there in the form of Sri Mallikarjuna Swami and Sri Bhramaramba Devi. He invited both of them to the new temple, Devi Bhramaramba agreed to travel with him. But she made a condition that no one should look back during the travel time. Devadas along with the people agreed her condition. While traveling people acknowledged the presence of Devi with her anklet sound but while crossing the river the sound of anklet is not audible so everyone turned and look back to check the presence of goddess. Devi god angry for breaking the promise and disappeared into the River. Devadas god worried and wounded himself with his sword . On seeing his devotion Devi Bhramaramba appeared as Devi Chowdeshwari and granted a boon that she will be there anytime when a person calls her with pure devotion. From that day, Devanga people perform this alagu seva method to invoke the goddess .
