= Sri Ramalinga Sowdeswari Amman =

Hindu deity

Sowdeshwari
- Goddess of Wealth and prosperity
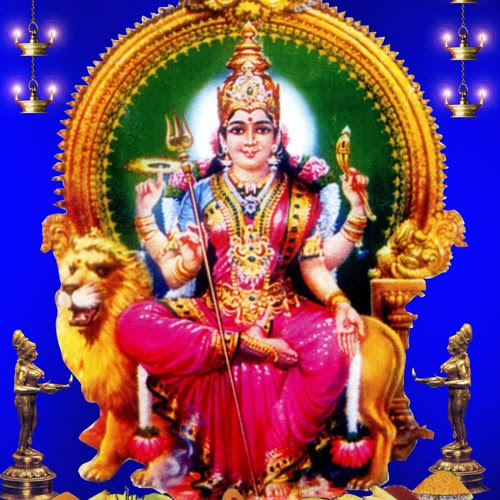
- Poster of Chowdeshwari Amman
- Affiliation: Devi, Parvati
- Mantra: Om Soolahasthaya vidmahe simhadvajaya deemahi thanno chowdi prachodayat
- Weapon: Trishula
- Adherents: Devanga
- Mount: Lion
- Consort: Shiva in the form of Ramalingeswara

Sri Ramalinga Chowdeshwari Amman (Tamil: ஸ்ரீ ராமலிங்கசௌடேஸ்வரி அம்மன், Kannada: ಶ್ರೀ ರಾಮಲಿಂಗ ಚೌಡೇಶ್ವರಿ ದೇವಿ), also known as Sowdeshwari, is a Hindu folk deity, regarded by adherents to be a regional form of either Mahadevi considered to be the Kuladevata of the Devanga people.

== Nomenclature ==
This goddess is worshipped in three forms: Shakti, Chamunda, and Jyothi. Her other names are Banashankari, Renugadevi, Chandi, Chowdamba, and Choodambigai.

== Legend ==
According to the Devanga Purana, the sage Devala is regarded to be the progenitor of the Devanga community. An incarnation of Manu, he is believed to have emerged from the third eye of Shiva to create clothing, and to teach weaving to the world. When Devala returned after obtaining threads from Vishnu, a group of five rakshasas, Vajramushti, Dhoomravakra, Dhoomratchasa, Chithrasena, and Panchasena, attacked him at midnight. In the dark, the power of the rakshasas was overwhelming. Devala attempted to fight them off by using Vishnu's Sudarshana Chakra, but failed, and finally prayed for Shakti to protect him. Shakti appeared in light and glory, wearing a bright full crown, holding a trident and other weapons in her hand while mounted on a lion. She killed the rakshasas; their blood was white, black, red, green, and yellow. Devala soaked his threads in the rakshasas's colorful blood. Shakti was offered the name Sowdeshwari or Chowdeshwari, literally meaning, 'the goddess of brightness'. Sowdeshwari advised Devala to worship her during every new moon (Amavashya).

== Literature ==
According to the Ramayana, Rama, the seventh avatar of the Vishnu, prayed to the god Shiva to absolve him of the sin of killing a Brahmin, committed during the war against the rakshasa king Ravana (who was also a Brahmin, son of a rishi) in Lanka. Rama wanted to have a large lingam to worship Shiva. He directed Hanuman, the lieutenant of his army, to bring a lingam from the Himalayas. When Hanuman was delayed in bringing the lingam, the goddess Sita built a small lingam out of the sand available in the seashore, which is believed to be the lingam in the temple's sanctum.

According to the community's tradition, all of them decided to give the lingam brought by Hanuman to a great rishi, and they choose Devala. Devala bought the lingam and named it as Ramalingam, as it was given by Rama. From that day, he worshipped Ramalingam along with Sowdeshwari, and hence Sowdeshwari was called Ramalinga Sowdeshwari.

== Worship ==
=== Rituals ===
The pooja rituals for Sri Ramalinga Sowdeshwari Amman are a mixture of the culture of North and South India. The celebrants build a small cart-like building using jaggery, roof it with sugarcane and use Betel leaf for decoration. A special turmeric called pandaram is offered as Prasāda for the deities. The Devanga people perform all their rituals by themselves.

=== Alagu seva ===
This ritual derives from the story that King Devadas, the seventh incarnation of Devala, built a beautiful temple for Sowdeshwari. He invited Lord Shiva and Parvathi from Srisailam to the temple but on the way Parvathi disappeared in the water as Devadas broke his promise. Devadas and his soldiers then wounded themselves with swords and suddenly the goddess appeared and joined them. The alagu seva ritual commemorates this event and invokes Sowdeshwari Amman. It is performed only by the Devanga people. The holy turmeric mixture, pandaram, is applied to the wounds to protect them from infection. The celebrants, called veerakumars, strike their bare chests with holy swords in a ritual dance. The ritual is also called alagu seva or katthi haakkadhu.

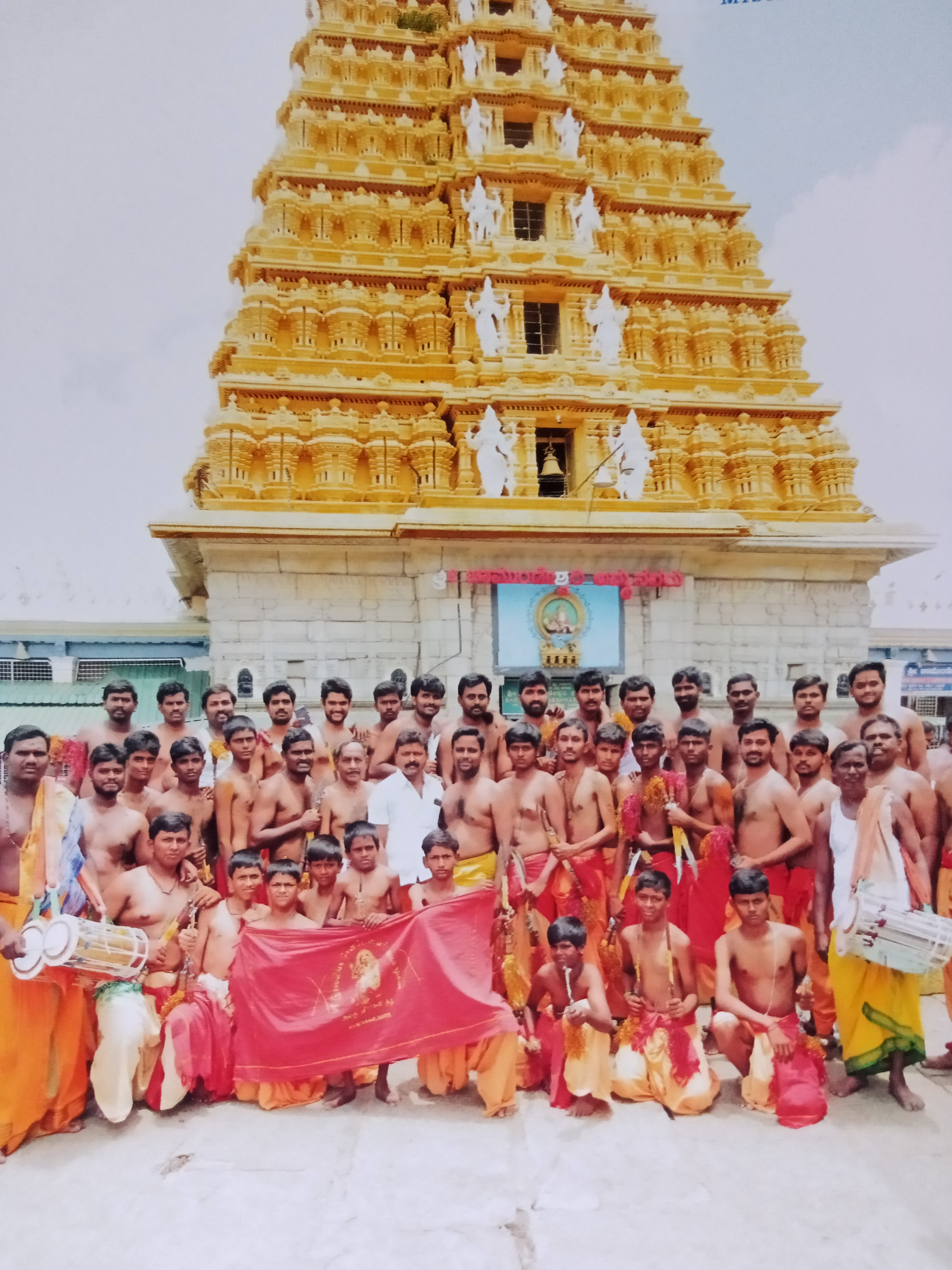
Alagu Veera Kumarargal (in front of Sri Chamundeshwari Temple, Mysuru)

=== Jagajathara Dhoddabba ===
Jagajathara Dhoddabba is a five-day festival celebrated for Sri Ramalinga Sowdeshwari Amman.

The fourth day of the festival is dedicated to the goddess Gundam – "Kappelaaaru" clan goddess will be revered for Gundam.

== Festivals ==
- Devanga new year: Those who follow the calendar of moon's rotation celebrate their new year on the day of Ugadi. If they follow the sun's rotation calendar, they celebrate their new year on the day of Chaithra 1. Most communities celebrate Ugadi as their new year.
- Chaitra Suddha Panchami: This is the birthday celebration of Sage Devala. It is celebrated on the fifth Thithi day after Ugadi.
- Ashadha Amavasya: This is the birthday celebration of the Goddess, commemorating Sowdeshwari's rescue of Sage Devala and her conquest over the rakshasas. It is celebrated on Amavasya of Ashadha month. The Devanga people also celebrate every Amavasya as their holy day, stopping weaving and offering prayers to Sowdeshwari.
- Devanga Janivara: Devanga people follow Rig Upakarma and therefore celebrate Janivara on the Shraavana Purnima (full moon day) of the traditional Hindu calendar, which is also the day of Raksha Bandhan in North India. It is known as Avani Avittam in Tamil Nadu and Kerala.
- Yearly Festival (Varusha Habba): The yearly festival of Sowdeshwari Amman Temple usually falls during the season of Navratri but varies depending on the tradition of the area. It includes Alagu Sevai, Shakti Chamunda Jyothi pooja, Manja Neer Meravana, and Amman Beethi Ulaa. It is also known as Aikilu Habba.
- Sankranti: Most Devanga people celebrate the Sankranti festival. In Tamil Nadu, they celebrate Pongal instead of Sankranthi.
- Deepavali: Devanga groups celebrate Deepavali. This varies by family tradition.
- Janmastami: The Devanga people celebrate the Krishna Ashtami festival.
- Ramnavami: As the Devanga pray to Lord Shiva in the form of Ramalingeshwar, they also celebrate Ramnavami.

The Devanga community flag is yellow, with the figures of Nandhi, Surya and Chandra depicted in green.

== Shrines ==
=== Hemakooda monastery ===
The Gayathri Peedam Hemakooda (Hemakooda monastery) in Hampi, Karnataka is led by Devanga Kula Jegath Guru Abbot Hampi Hemakooda Gayathri Peeda Sri Sri Sri Dhayananthapuri swamiji, a leader of the Devanga community.

=== Sambusailam monastery ===
The Sambusailam monastery at Jalakandapuram, Tamil Nadu is led by Devangakula Guru Abbot Chandramouleswara Swamiji.

== Bibliography ==
- Pintchman, Tracy (1994). The Rise of the Goddess in the Hindu Tradition. SUNY Press, New York. ISBN 0-7914-2112-0.
- Census of India, 1961: Madras
- Salem City, 1980
- South India
- 2nd Congress on Traditional Sciences and Technologies of India, 27–31 December 1995, Anna University, Madras
- People of India
- Wangu, Madhu Bazaz (2003).
- Religions in the Modern World
