= Monkey Man =

Monkey Man may refer to:

== Fiction ==
- Monkey Man (film), a 2024 film starring and directed by Dev Patel
- Axwell Tiberius, the eponymous simian character in the 1993–1999 comic book series Monkeyman and O'Brien

== Songs ==
- "Monkey Man" (Rolling Stones song), 1969
- "Monkey Man" (Toots & the Maytals song), 1969
- "Monkey Man", by Baby Huey & the Babysitters, 1965
- "Monkey Man", by Dave Matthews Band from The Lillywhite Sessions, 2001
- "Monkey Man", by David Byrne from Uh-Oh, 1992
- "Monkey Man", by Glenn Hughes from Music for the Divine, 1996

== Other uses ==
- Jyoti Raju (born 1988), Indian free solo climber nicknamed "Monkey Man"
- Monkey-man of Delhi, an Indian urban legend
- Bukit Timah Monkey Man, a legendary creature said to inhabit Singapore
