= Jyot =

Jyot is a name, and may refer to:

- Jeevan Jyot Kaur, Indian politician
- Jyot Singh, American politician

== See also ==
- Jyoti
- Joti (disambiguation)
