= Nandavaram =

- village
- Interactive map of Nandavaram
- Location in Andhra Pradesh, India Nandavaram (India)
- Coordinates: 15.375°N 78.280°E
- Country: India
- State: Andhra Pradesh
- District: Nandyal
- Mandal: Banaganapalle
- Elevation: 765 m (2,510 ft)

Languages
  - Official: Telugu
- Time zone: UTC+5:30 (IST)
- Postal code: 518124

Nandavaram is a village in the Banaganapalle mandal, Nandyal district of Andhra Pradesh, India.

Nandavaram village is famous for the temple of Goddess Sri Ramalinga Sowdeswari Amman. It is believed that Chowdeshwari devi came from Varanasi to Nandavarm through an underground passage within one day. The temple was built by King Nandana Chakravarthy. It is said that the actual deity that was present in the temple was so fearful to watch with the human eye and the powerful aura it carried made many a heart fail on seeing it. Therefore, the doors of the garbha griha were permanently closed and then another deity was made, which resembled the actual deity in posture, only less fearful to look at and that is the goddess deity that we see today in the temple. The temple structure was elevated so that the current deity sits exactly above the place where the original deity resides. To the east of the temple, there is a flight of stairs that go below to the place where the original garba griha existed but none is allowed to go there. There is a Srichakra in front of the deity and devotees can perform Kunkuma Archana by buying a ticket (Rs 30).The Chowdeswari devi main god to togataveera kshathriyas.

This temple assumes special significance and importance to the Nandavarik community of the Brahmins as it is their community's presiding deity. Therefore, a lot of patronage and funds come from the Nandavarik/Nandavareeka Brahmins. They are allowed to go inside the grabha-griha and perform personal pooja to the goddess Choudeshwari. It is common practice and recommended for Nandavariks to give a saree to the goddess.

== Geography ==
The famous Sri Chowdeswari Devi Temple is situated here. This is situated on the Panem/Panyam - Banaganapalle road and also away(70 km) from the famous temple Sri Ahobila Laksminarashimha Swami.. and (21 Km) from famous Sri Yaganti Uma Maheswara Temple.

== Also read ==
Chowdeshwari Temple, Dasarighatta, Tiptur
