= Devanga Purana =

The Devanga Purana is the kulapuranam, or mythological history, of the Devanga community. It deals with the life of their legendary founder, Devala Maharshi, and his seven incarnations, goddess (Chowdeswari), rituals and customs. The Devanga community reside in all the south Indian states and also split in north Indian states. They are traditionally engaged in cotton cloth weaving and cloth business.

== Religion ==
The main deities of Devangas are Sri Ramalinga Sowdeswari Amman or Sri Chowdeshwari Devi and Sri Ramalingeswara. They follow Mutt system and Gayatri devi as main deity.

== History ==
Devanga purana is written by Devanga Muni. It is written in the dasimatra-dvipadi style.
