= Joti =

Joti or JOTI may refer to:

- Jamboree on the Internet, an international Scouting activity
- Jyoti swarupini, a rāgam in Carnatic music

== See also ==
- Jyoti (disambiguation)
