= Virupaksha Temple, Hampi =

Temple in Karnataka, India

Virupaksha Temple
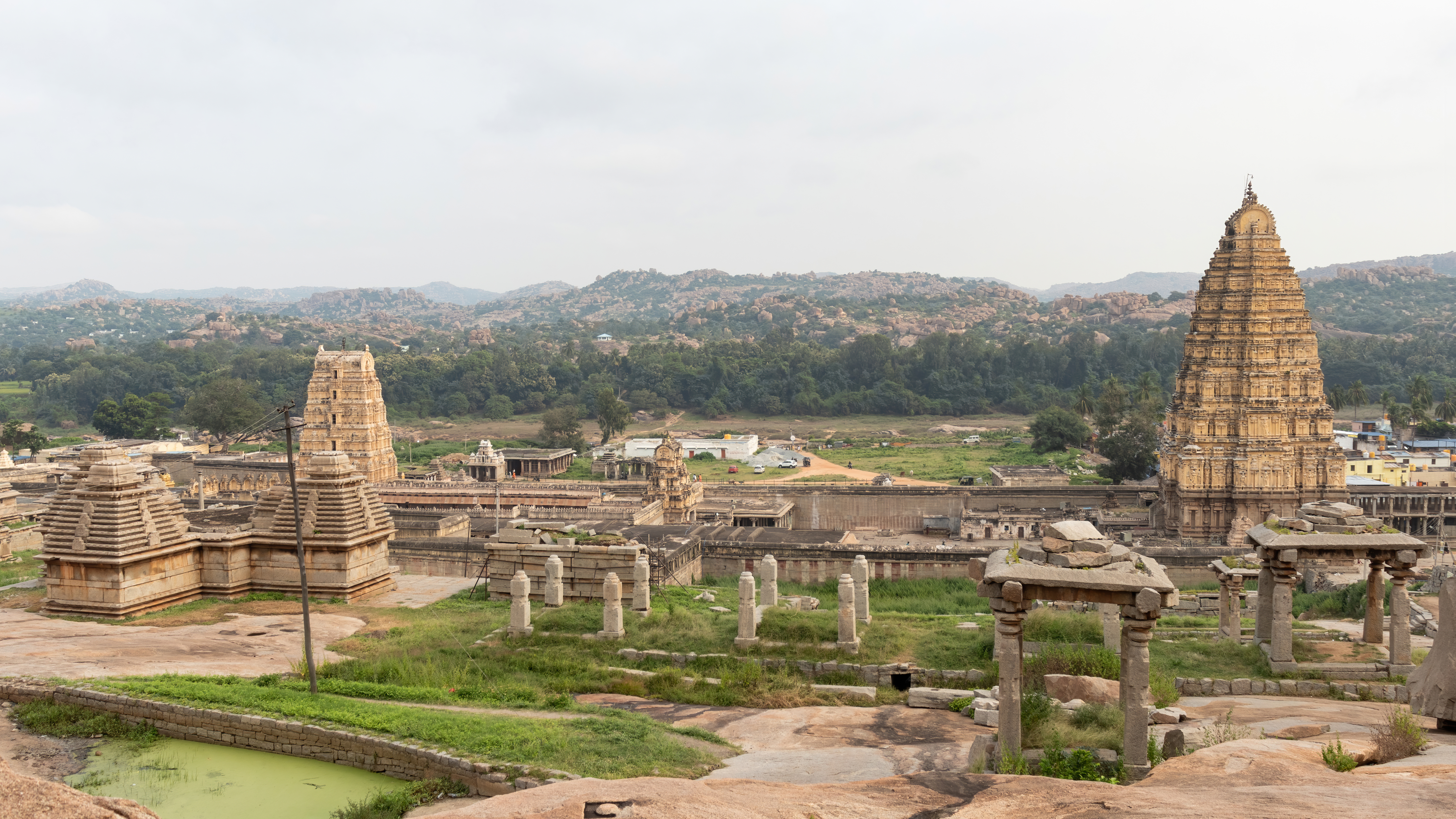
- Virupaksha (Pampapati) Temple complex at Hampi

- Location in Karnataka

Religion
- Affiliation: Hinduism
- District: Vijayanagara district
- Deity: Virupaksha (Shiva)

Location
- Location: Hampi (Pampa Kshetra)
- State: Karnataka
- Coordinates: 15.335165°N 76.458727°E

Architecture
- Type: Vijayanagara architecture
- Completed: 14th century

UNESCO World Heritage Site
- Criteria: Cultural: (i), (iii), (iv)
- Reference: 241
- Inscription: 1986 (10th Session)

The Virūpaksha Temple is located in Hampi in the Vijayanagara district of Karnataka, India, situated on the banks of the river Tungabhadra. Built in the 7th-century, it is dedicated to Virupaksha, a form of Shiva. It is part of the Group of Monuments at Hampi, designated as a UNESCO World Heritage Site. The temple was expanded by Lakkan Dandesha, a nayaka (chieftain) under the ruler Deva Raya II, also known as Prauda Deva Raya of the Vijayanagara Empire.

The Virupaksha Temple is the main center of pilgrimage at Hampi, and has been considered a sacred sanctuary over the centuries.

== History ==
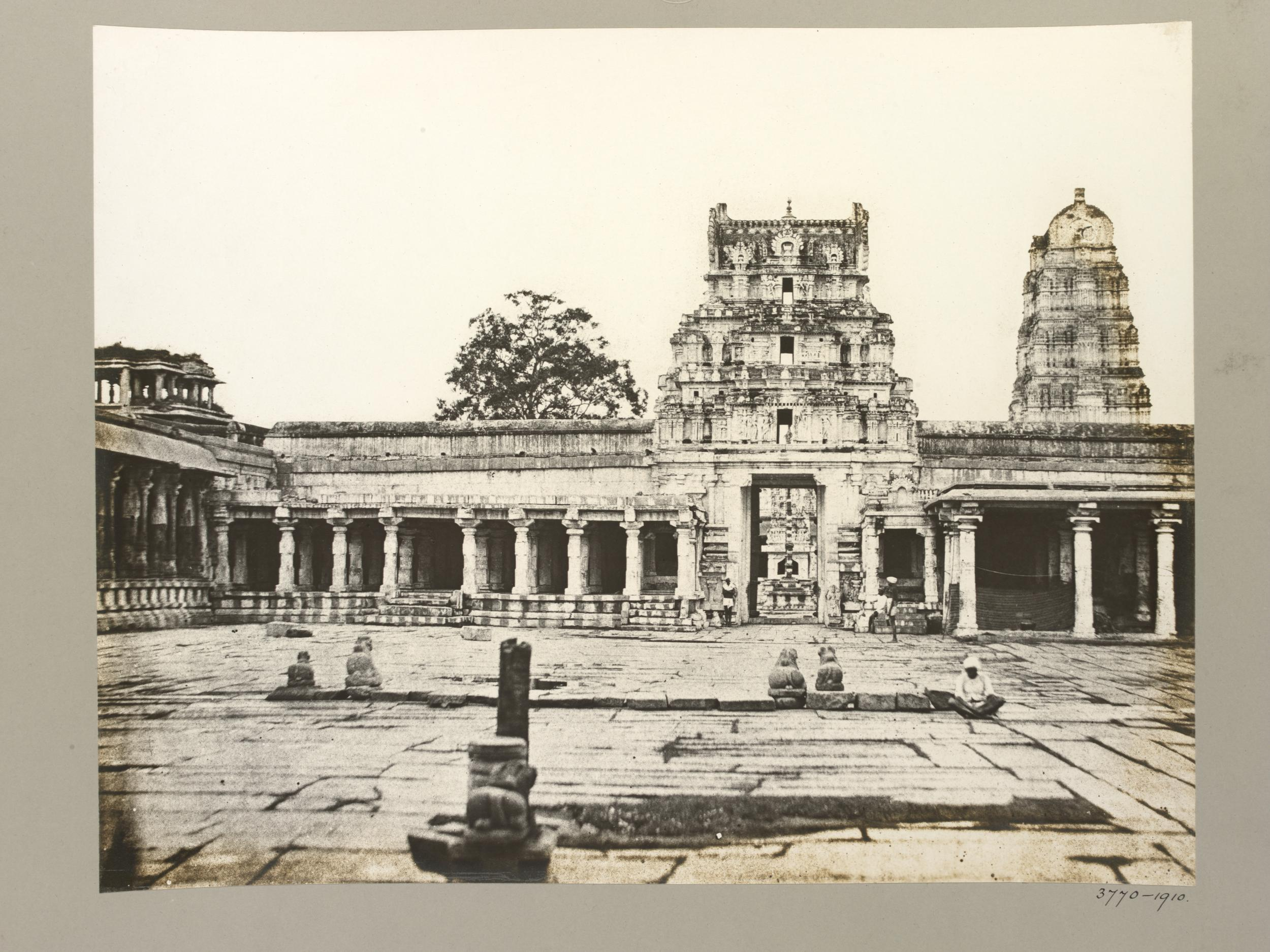
An 1856 photograph showing the interior of the Virupaksha Temple complex.

The temple's history is uninterrupted from about the 7th century CE. The Virupaksha-Pampa sanctuary existed well before the Vijayanagara capital was located here. Inscriptions referring to Shiva date back to the 9th and 10th centuries. The development of the Virupaksha shrine formed part of a wider transformation of the Hemkuta Hill sacred landscape. Study shows how the 12th century Mula Virupaksha Temple contributed to Hampi's development from a local Shaiva pilgrimage center associated with Pampa and Bhairava into a prominent center of Virupaksha worship. What started as a small shrine grew into a large complex under the Vijayanagara rulers. Evidence indicates there were additions made to the temple in the late Chalukyan and Hoysala periods, though most of the temple buildings are attributed to the Vijayanagara period. The huge temple complex was built by Lakkana Dandesha, a chieftain under king Deva Raya II of the Vijayanagara Empire.

Ceiling Paintings in the Virupaksha date to 14th and 16th centuries. The religious sect of Virupaksha-Pampa did not end with the destruction of the city in 1565. Worship there has persisted throughout the centuries. At the beginning of the 19th century there were major renovations and additions, which included restoring some of the broken towers of the north and east gopura.

This temple is presently the only well preserved and maintained temple in Hampi, the other numerous temples here were destroyed by the Deccan sultanates.

== Temple structure ==
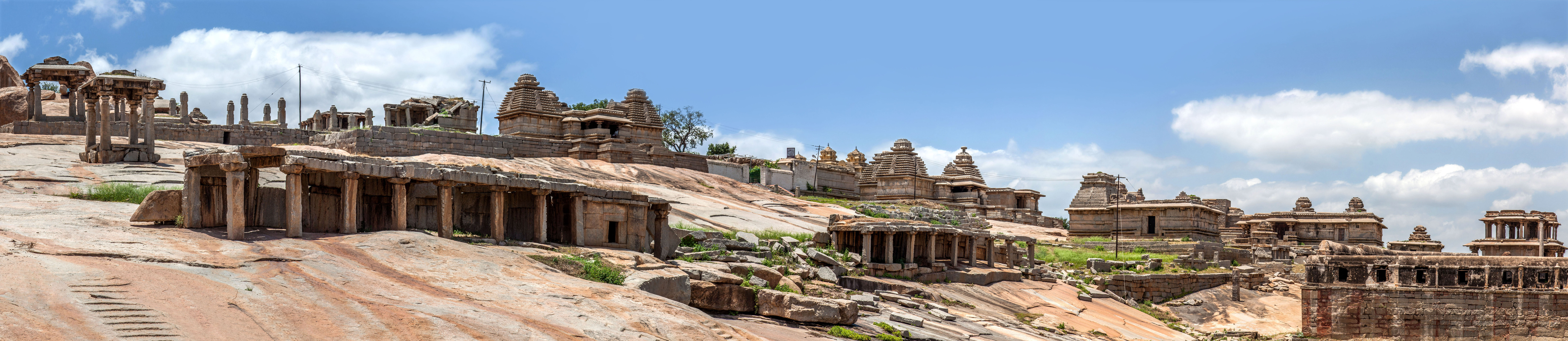
Panorama of the Virupaksha Temple complex and its historical surroundings at Hampi, a UNESCO World Heritage site in Karnataka.

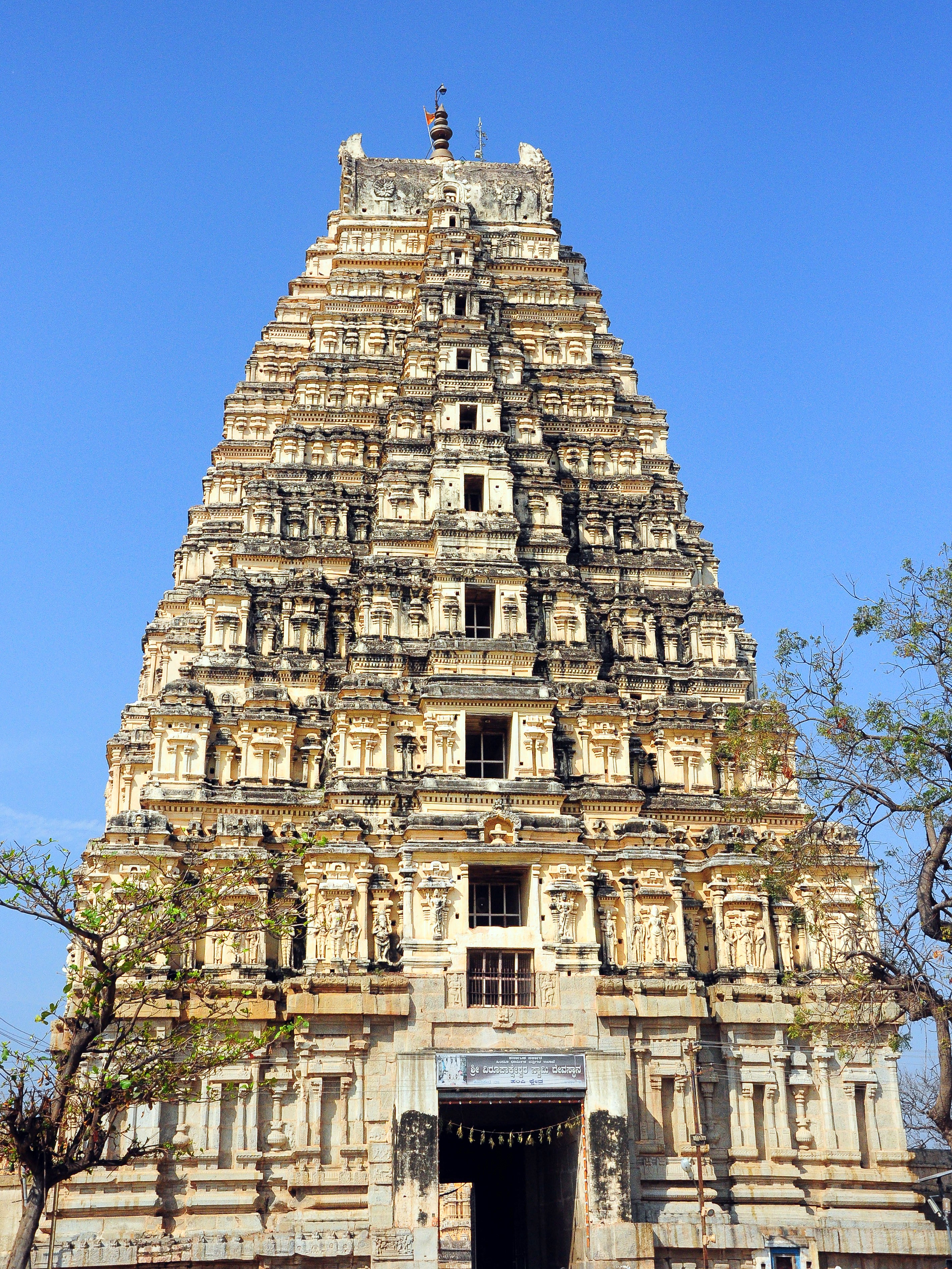
The main entrance of the Virupaksha Temple in Hampi

At present, the main temple consists of a sanctum, three ante chambers, a pillared hall and an open pillared hall. It is decorated with delicately carved pillars. A pillared cloister, entrance gateways, courtyards, smaller shrines and other structures surround the temple.

The nine-tiered eastern gateway, which is the largest at 50 meters, is well-proportioned and incorporates some earlier structures. It has a brick superstructure and a stone base. It gives access to the outer court containing many sub-shrines.

The smaller eastern gateway leads to the inner court with its numerous smaller shrines.

Another gopuram towards north, known as the Kanakagiri gopura, leads to a small enclosure with subsidiary shrines and eventually to the Tungabhadra River.

A narrow channel of the Tungabhadra River flows along the temple's terrace and then descends to the temple-kitchen and out through the outer court.

One of the most striking features of this temple is the usage of mathematical concepts to build and decorate it. The temple has repeated patterns that demonstrate the concept of fractals. The main shape of the temple is triangular. As you look up the temple top, the patterns divide and repeat themselves, just like in a snowflake.

Krishnadevaraya, one of the famous Vijayanagara emperor, was a major patron of this temple. The most ornate of all structures in the temple, the central pillared hall is believed to be his addition to this temple. So is the gateway tower giving access to the inner courtyard of the temple. Inscriptions on a stone plaque installed next to the pillared hall explain his contribution to the temple. It is recorded that Krishnadevaraya commissioned this hall in 1510 CE to mark his accession. He also built the eastern gopuram. These additions meant that the central shrine came to occupy a relatively small part of the complex. The halls in the temple were used for a variety of purposes. Some were spaces in which the images of gods were placed to witness special programmes of music, dance, and drama. Others were used for the wedding rituals of deities.

== Festivals ==
The temple continues to prosper and attracts huge crowds for the betrothal and wedding festivities of Virupaksha and Pampa in December.

In the month of February the annual chariot festival is celebrated here.

== Gallery ==
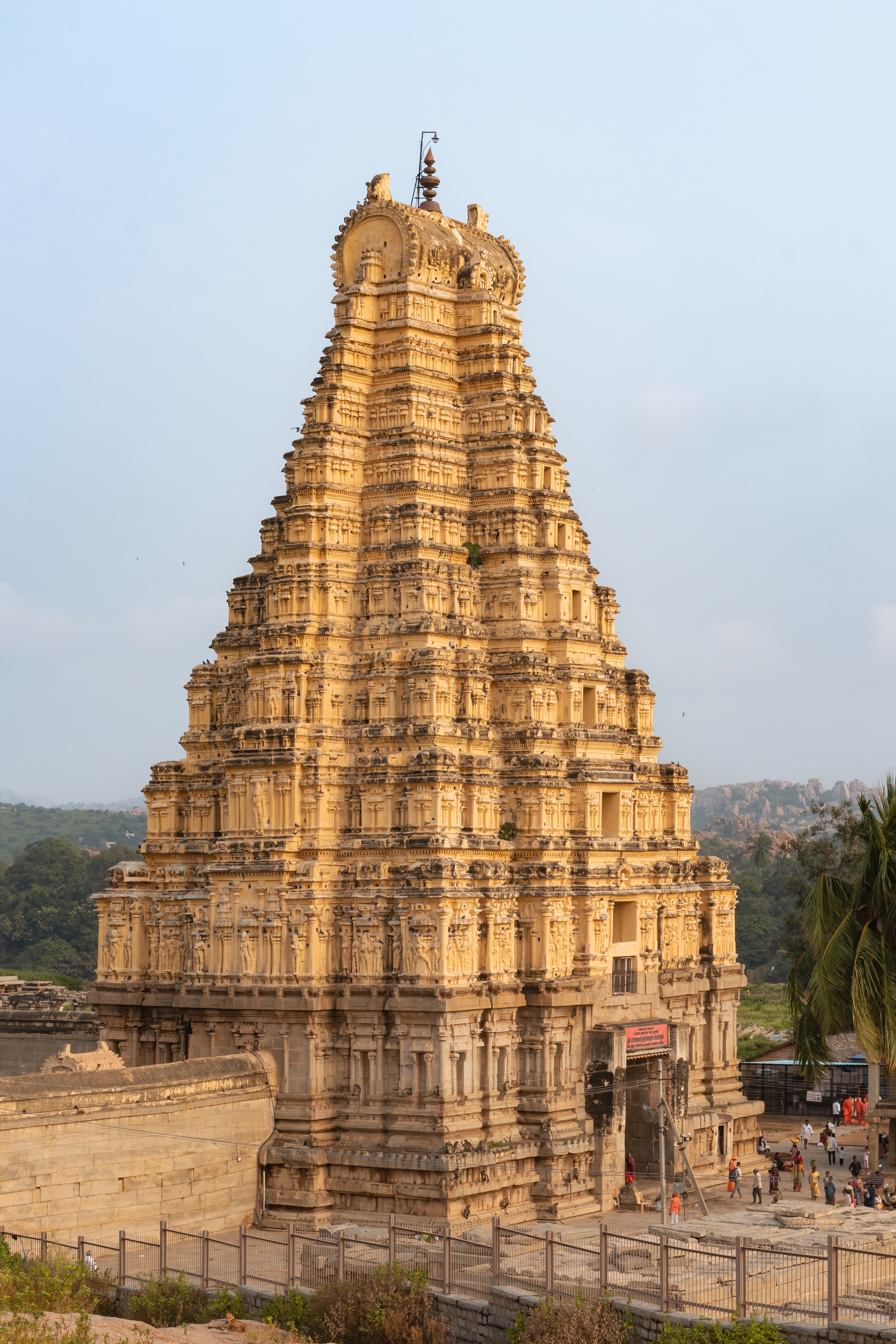
Gopuram of Virupaksha Temple

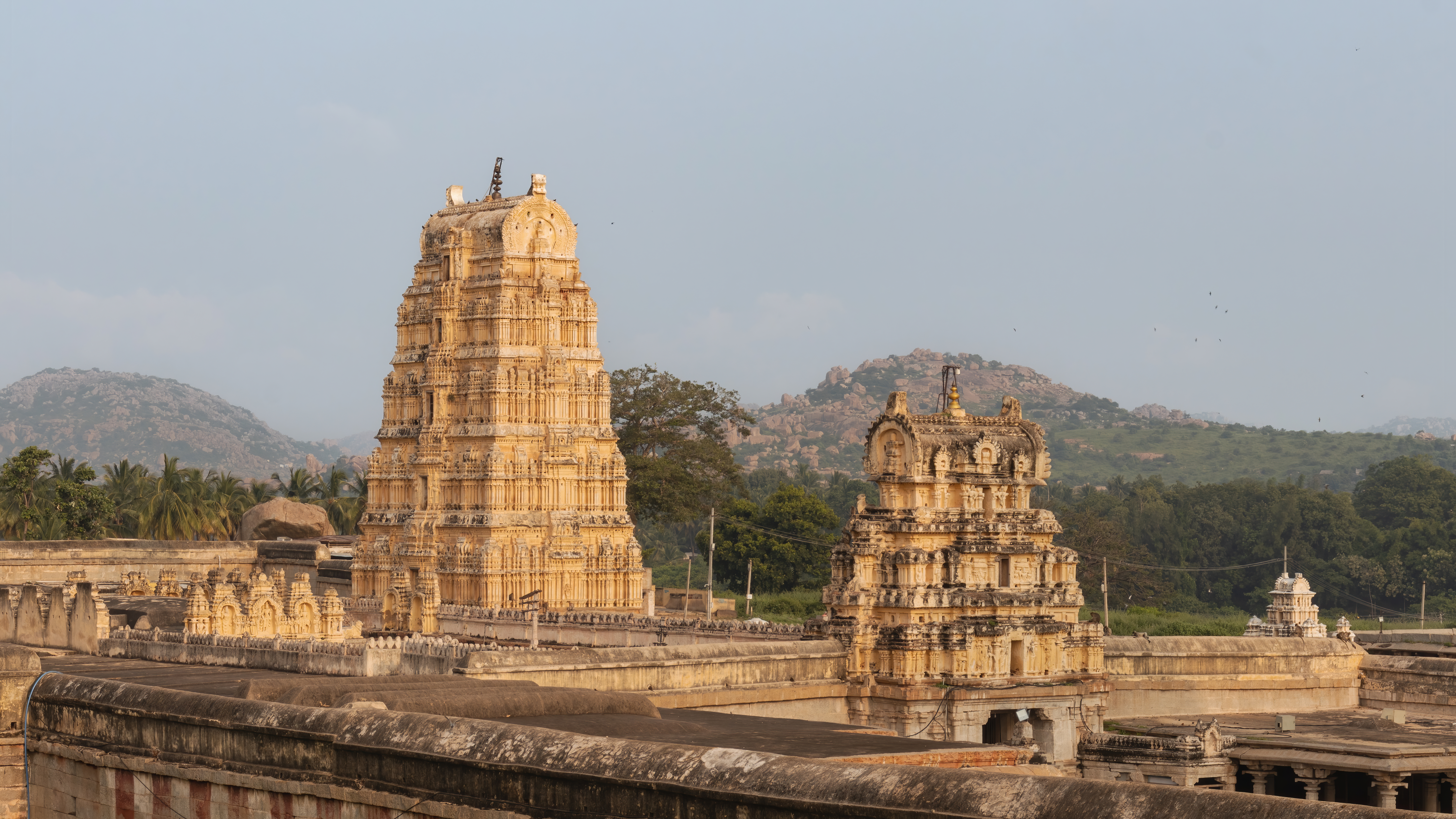
Garbhagriha of Virupaksha Temple

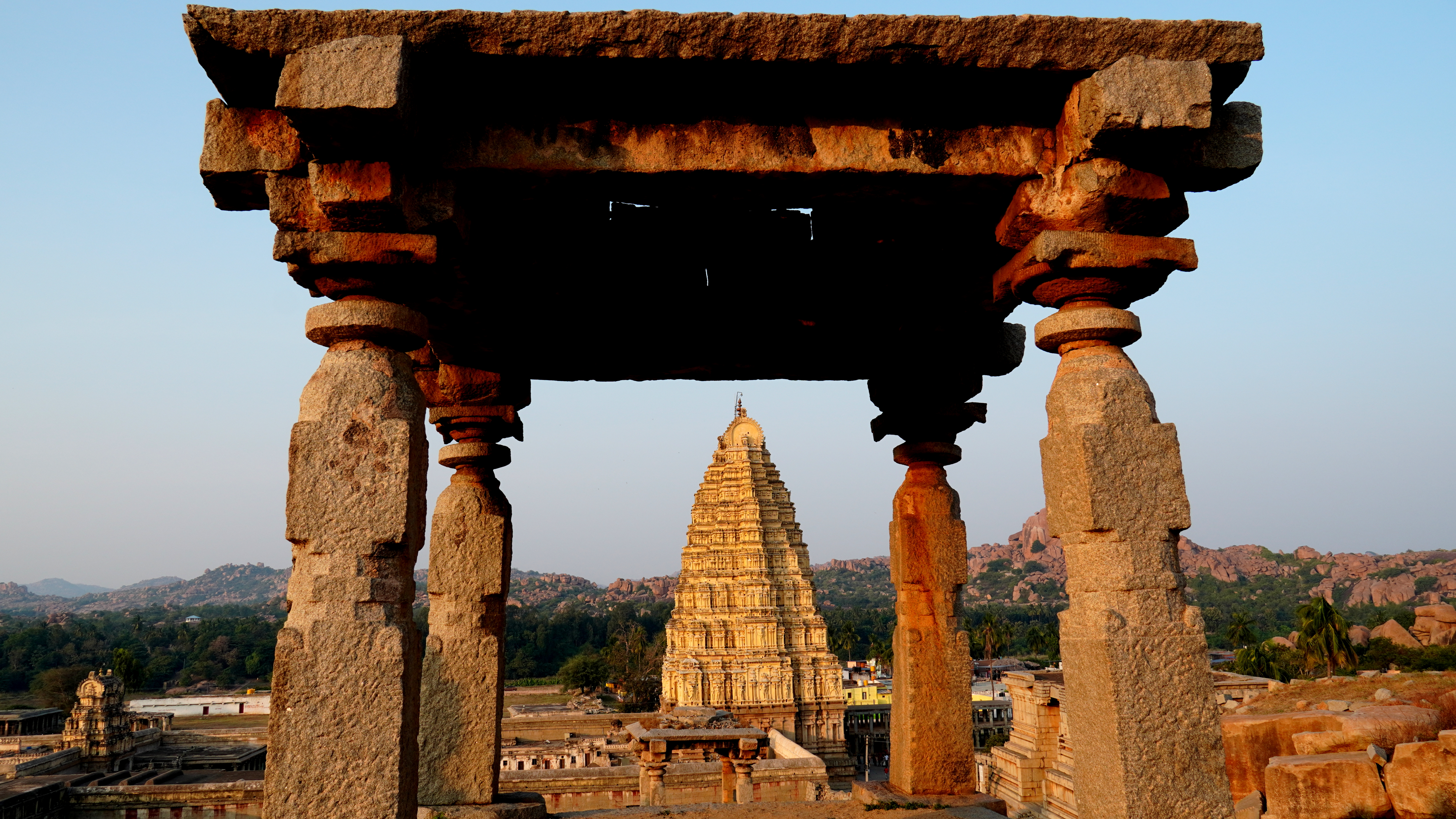
Virupaksha Temple gopuram framed by a stone mandapa

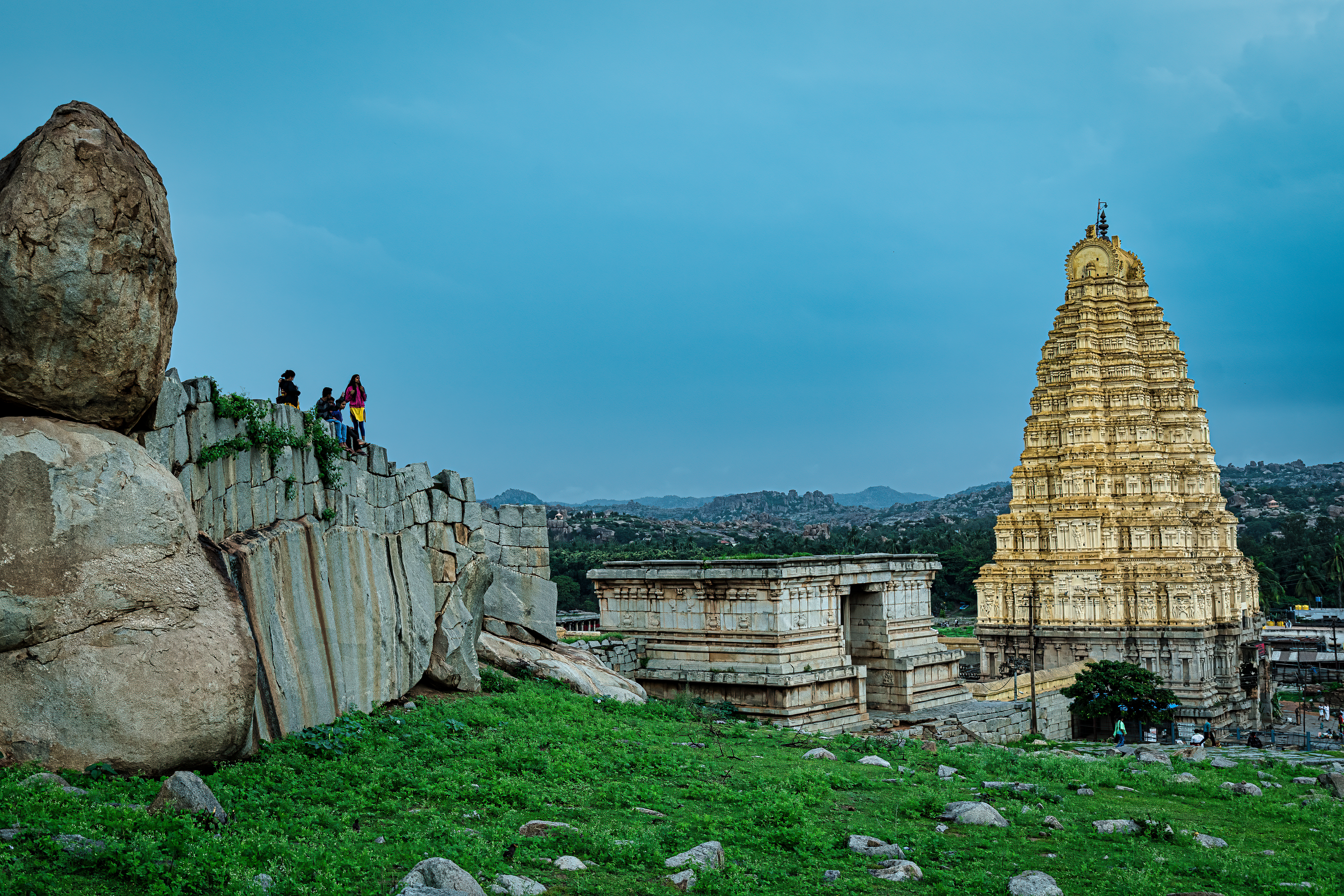
Panoramic high-angle view of the Virupaksha Temple complex and the surrounding boulder-strewn landscape of Hampi, seen from a nearby hilltop.

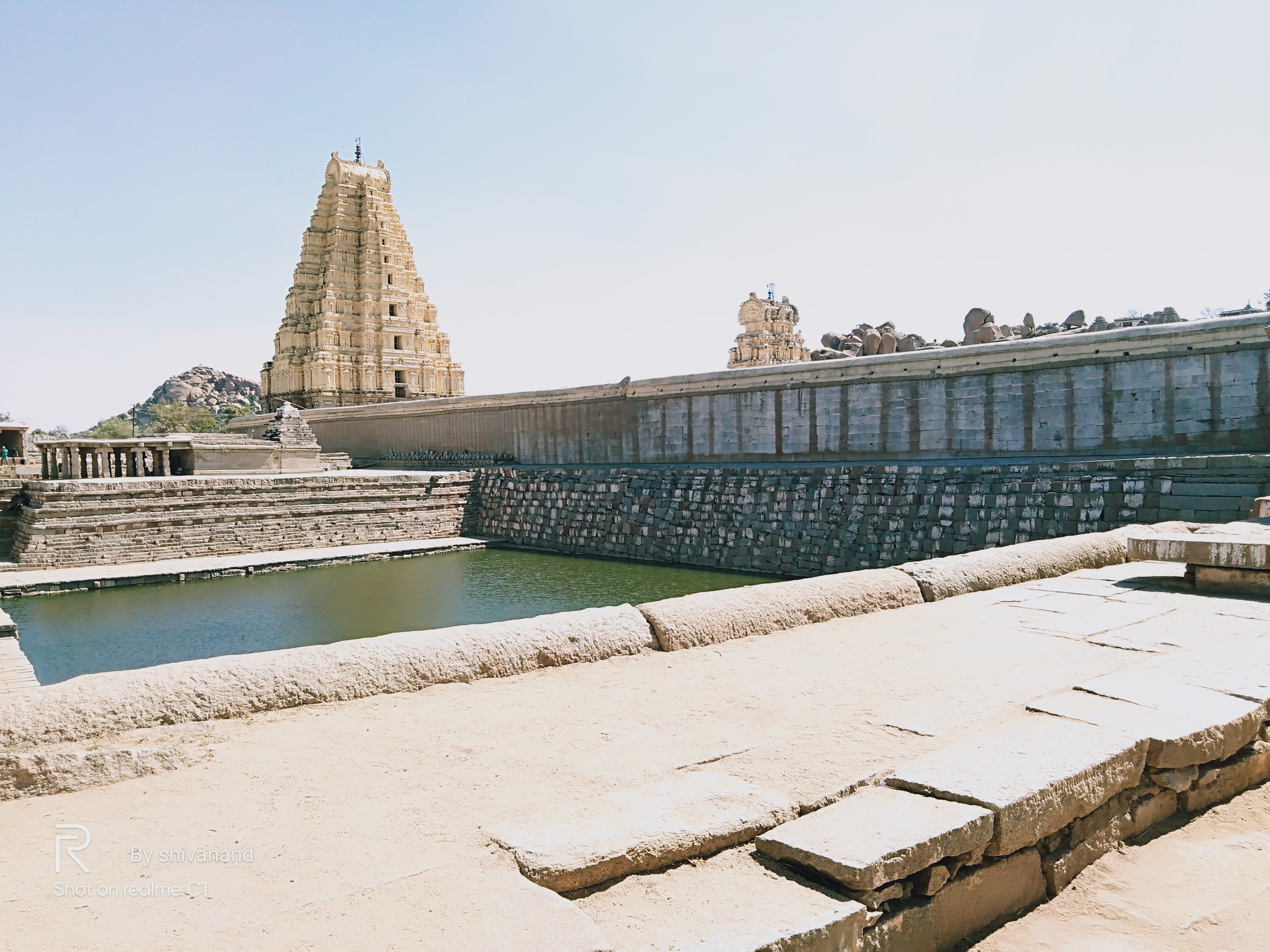
Virupaksha Temple, with the gopuram seen across the temple tank

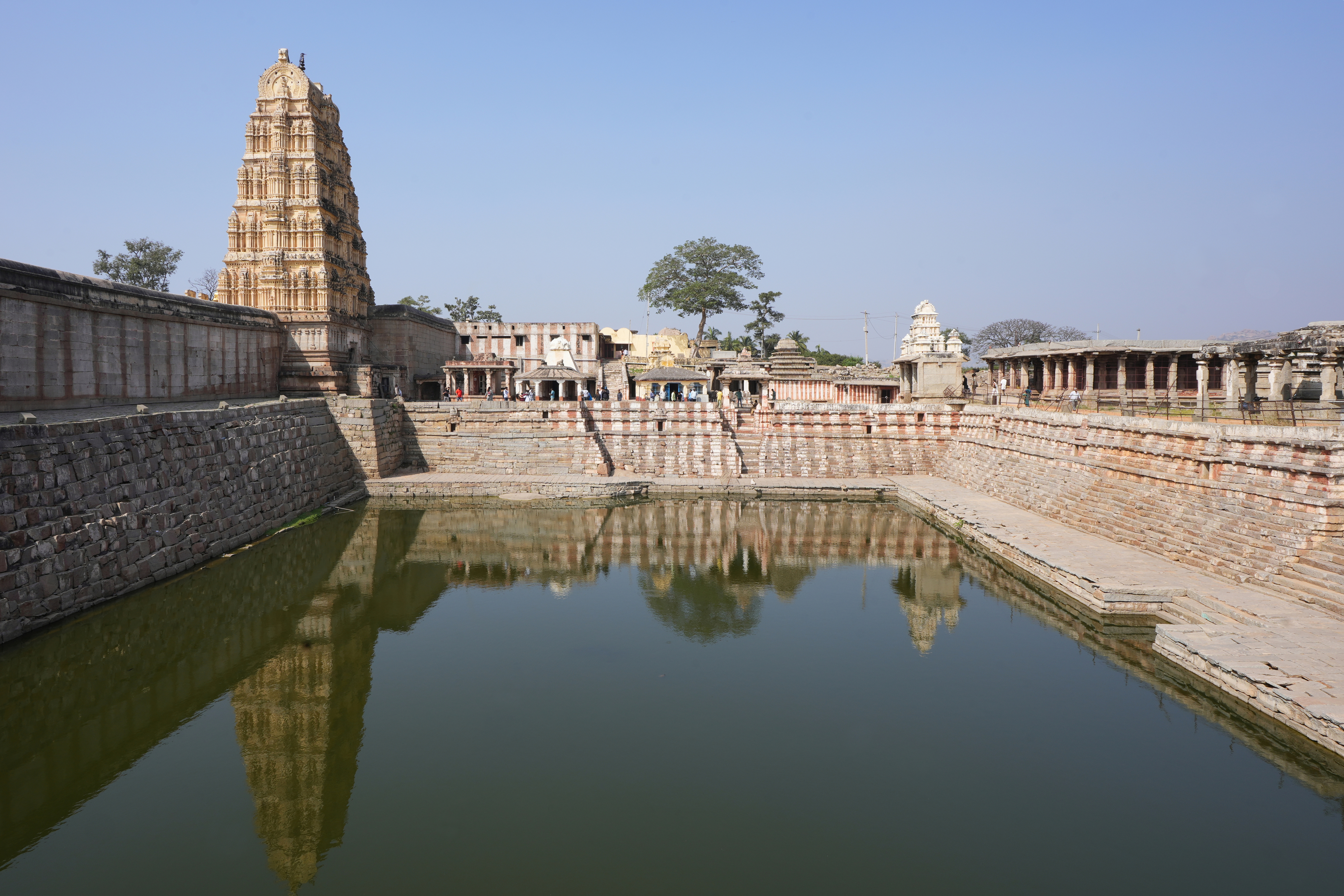
Sacred stepwell and temple tank located at the Virupaksha Temple site, Hampi

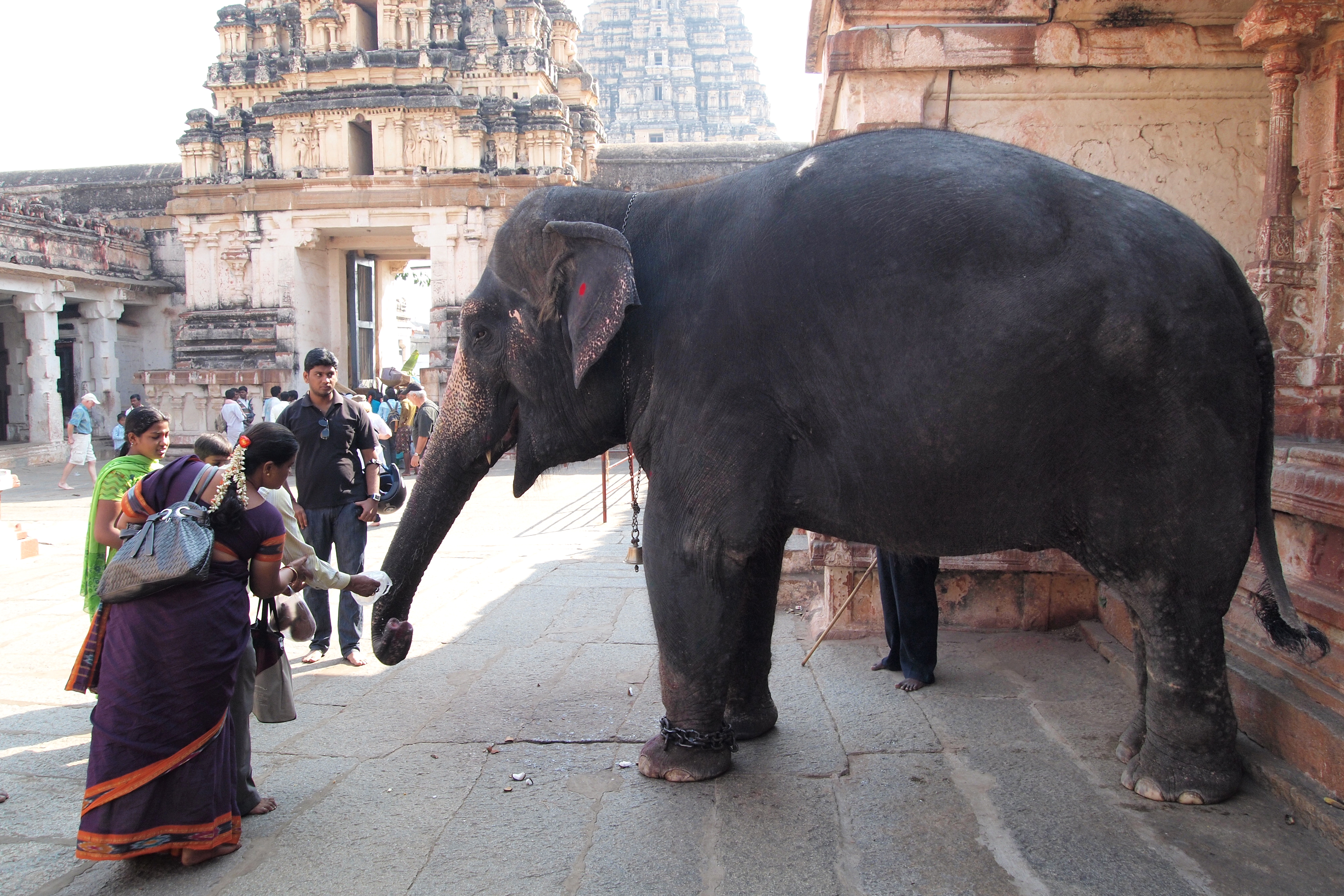
Lakshmi, temple elephant of Virupaksha Temple

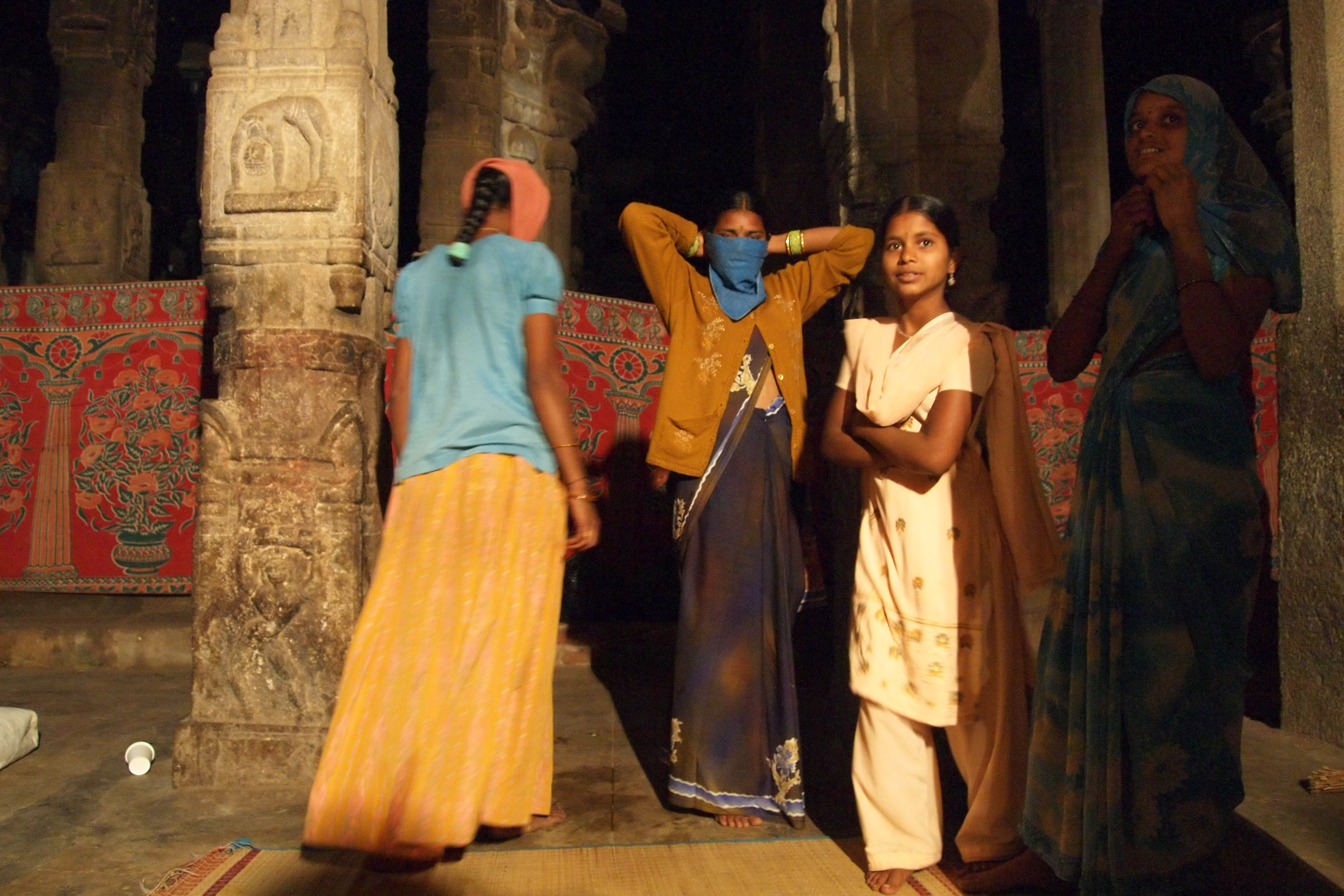

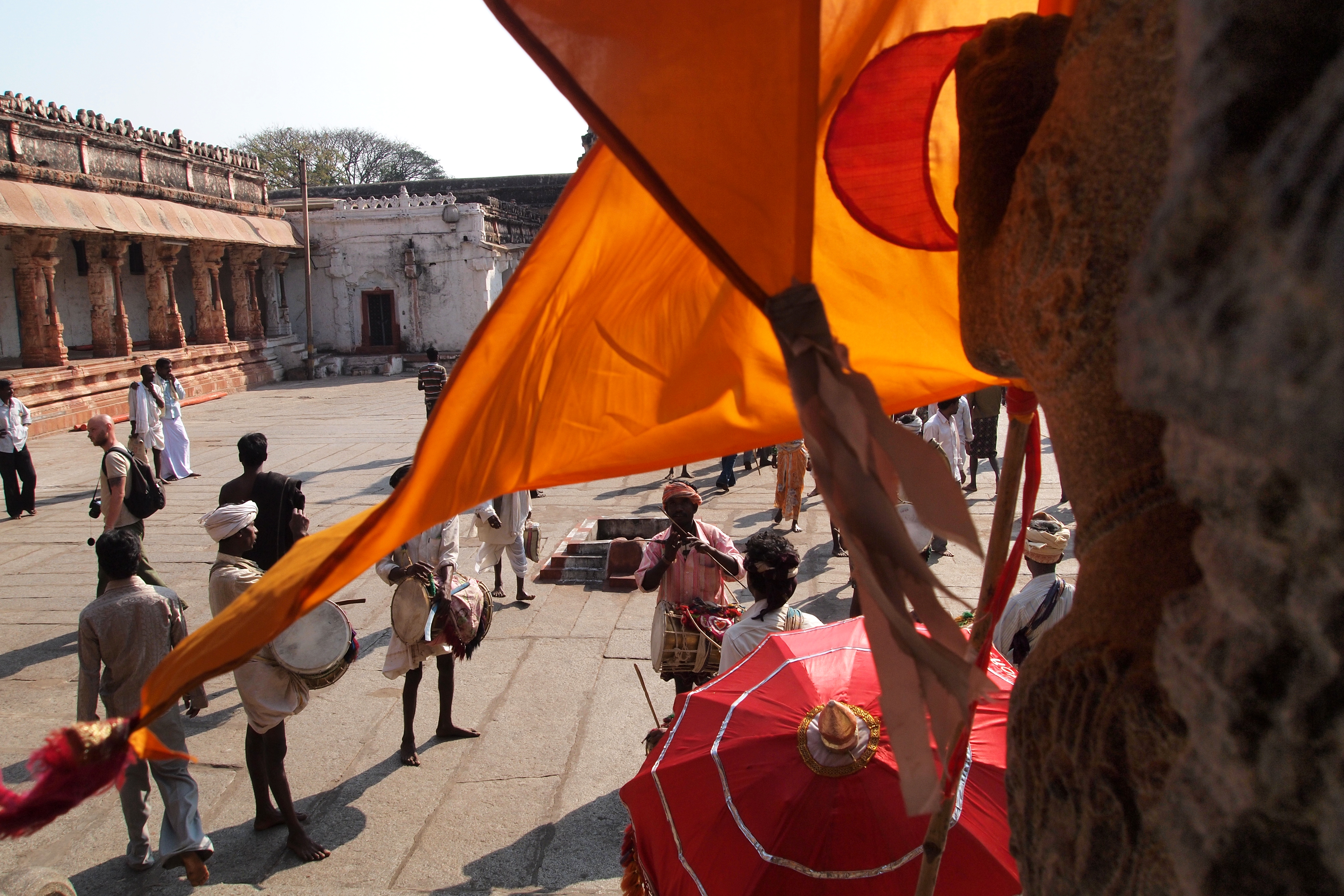

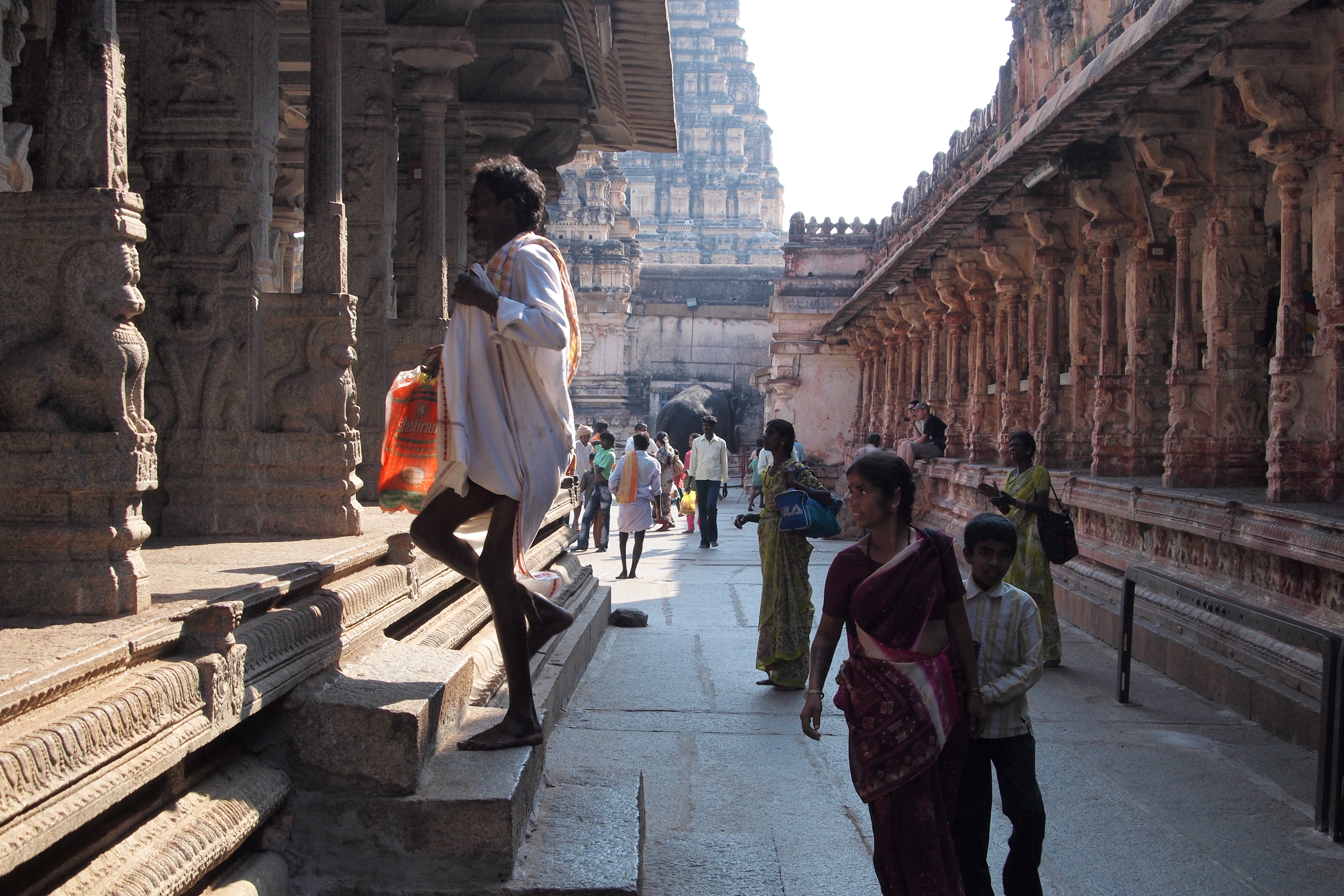

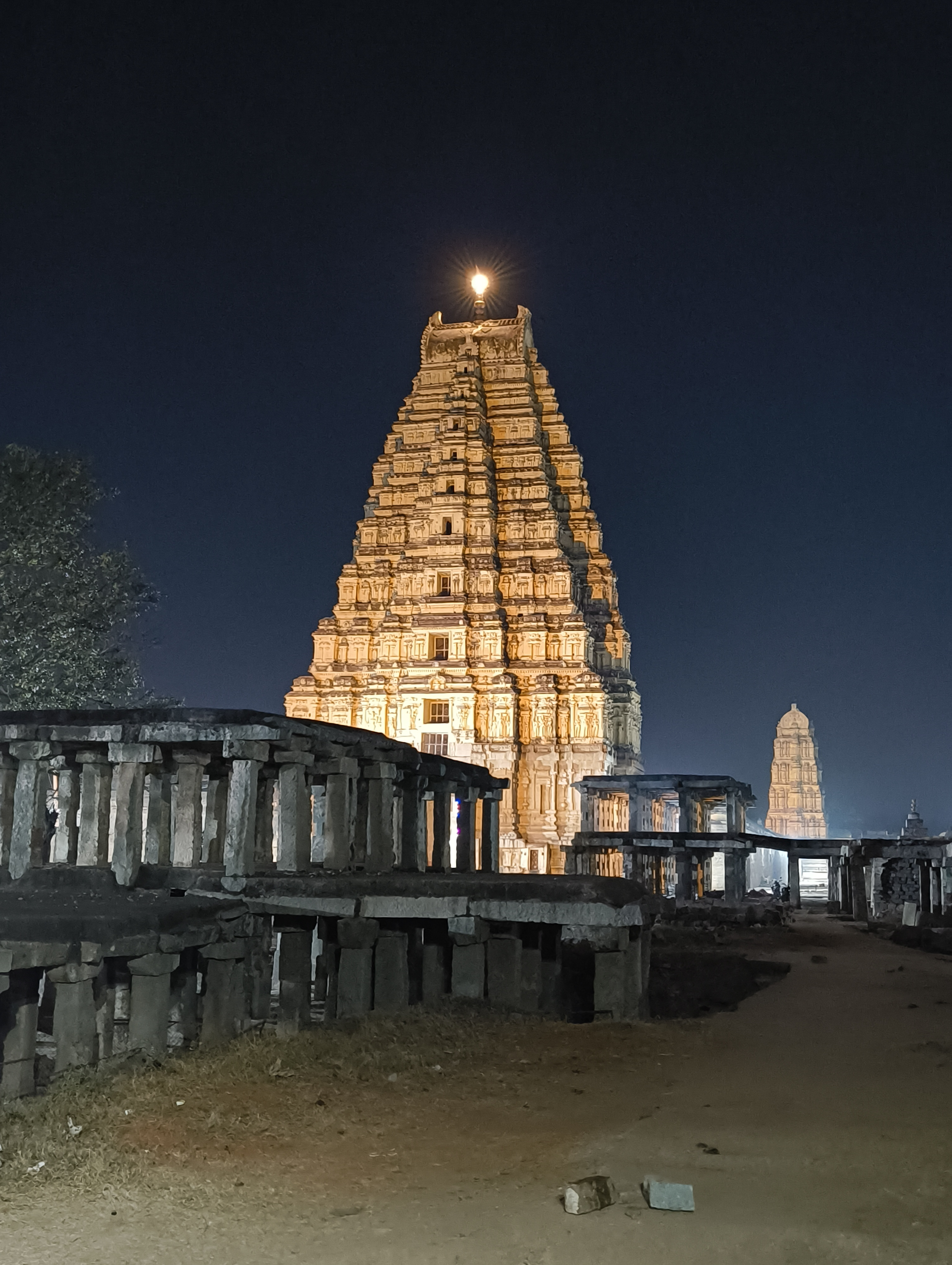
