= Light of Life =

Light of Life may refer to:

- The Light of Life, an 1896 choral work by Edward Elgar
- Light of Life (The Bar-Kays album), 1978
- Light of Life (Sons of Korah album), 1999

== See also ==
- Jeevana Jyothi (disambiguation)
