= Jeevana Jyothi =

Jeevana Jyothi or Jeevana Jyoti or Jeevan Jyoti or Jeewan Jyoti (lit. 'Light of Life') is the name of many Indian films:

- Jeevan Jyoti (1937 film), a 1937 Hindi film
- Jeevana Jyothi (1940 film), a 1940 Telugu film
- Jeewan Jyoti (1953 film), a 1953 Hindi film
- Jeevana Jyothi (1975 film), a 1975 Telugu film directed by K. Vishwanath
- Jeevan Jyoti (1976 film), a 1976 Hindi film by A.V.M. Productions
- Jeevana Jyothi (1987 film), a Kannada film
- Jeevana Jyothi (1988 film), a 1988 Telugu film directed by Relangi Narasimha Rao

== See also ==
- Jeevan, an Indian name
- Jyothi (disambiguation)
- Light of Life (disambiguation)
- Pradhan Mantri Jeevan Jyoti Bima Yojana (lit. 'Prime Minister's Jeevan Jyoti Insurance Scheme'), an Indian government insurance scheme
