= Dhayananthapuri Swamiji =

Devanga Jagathguru sri sri sri Dhayananthapuri Swamiji
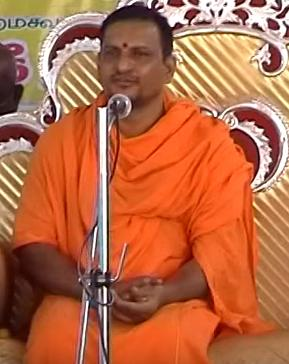
- Dhayananthapuri Swamiji
- Title: Devanga Jagathguru

Personal life
- Born: Karnataka near hampi

Religious life
- Religion: Hinduism

Devanga Jagadguru Maharaj Sri Sri Sri Dayanandapuri Mahaswamiji is a leader of the community and abbot of Gayathri Peedam (monastery) Hemakooda – Hampi, Karnataka, India.

Devanga people are also called Jadaru or Jada ( great man ), Dendra, Devare, Deva, Semiyan and Sedam.

Lathigar is a sect of Devanga. Word Lathi in Kannada means Baton in English. Baton means Sengol in Tamil. Lathigar means baton holder.

Kingdoms include Kingdom of Amod Nagar, Sagara Kingdom including present day Uttarakhand, Uttar Pradesh, Haryana, Chalukya Chola, Chalukya of Badami, Western Chalukya, Saluva dynasty of Vijayanagara Empire.

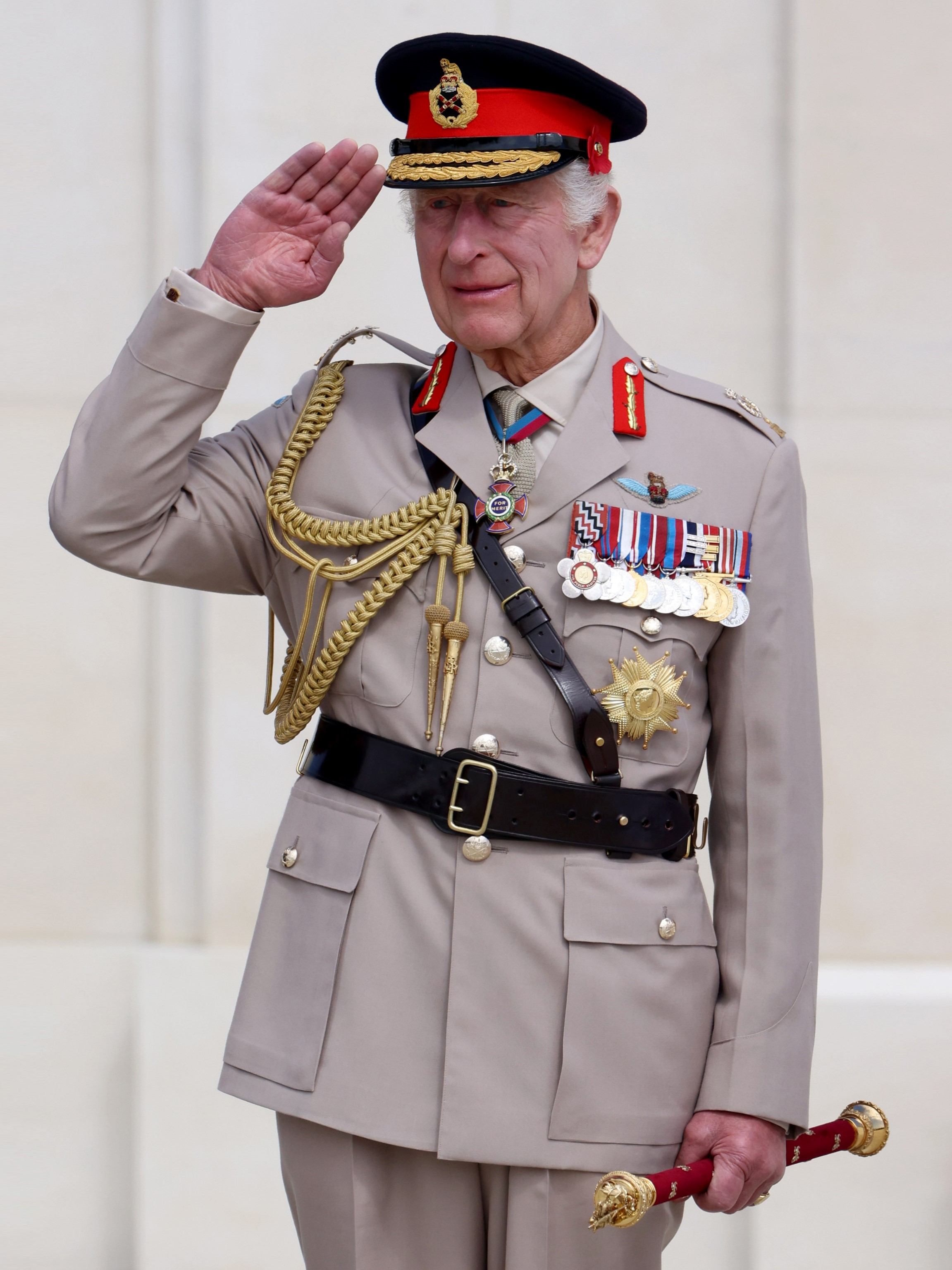
Charles 3 with Baton
