= Jyothi (album) =

Studio album by Charlie Mariano and the Karnataka College of Percussion
- Released: 1983
- Recorded: February 1983
- Studio: Tonstudio Bauer; Ludwigsburg, West Germany
- Genre: Jazz
- Length: 45:31
- Label: ECM 1256
- Producer: Manfred Eicher

Charlie Mariano chronology
Sleep My Love (1979)	Jyothi (1983)	Tears of Sound (1984)

Jyothi is an album by American jazz alto saxophonist Charlie Mariano and the Karnataka College of Percussion featuring R. A. Ramamani, recorded in February 1983 and released on ECM later that same year.

== Reception ==
The AllMusic review by Ron Wynn awarded the album 3 stars stating "Mariano wails, winds, and experiments with Karnataka College of Percussionists."

Professional ratings
Review scores
Source	Rating
Allmusic	3/5 stars

== Track listing ==
All compositions by R. A. Ramamani

1. "Voice Solo" – 5:03
2. "Vandanam" – 7:49
3. "Varshini" – 8:19
4. "Saptarshi" – 6:41
5. "Kartik" – 11:10
6. "Bhajan" – 6:29

== Personnel ==
- Charlie Mariano – soprano saxophone, flute
- The Karnataka College of Percussion
  - R. A. Ramamani – vocals, tamboura
  - T. A. S. Mani – mridangam
  - R. A. Rajagopal – ghatam, morsing, konakkol
  - T. N. Shashikumar – kanjira, konakkol
