= Belagur =

Belagur Belaguru
- Village
- Location in Karnataka, India Belagur (India)
- Coordinates: 13°37′33″N 76°17′21″E
- Country: India
- State: Karnataka
- District: Chitradurga
- Talukas: Hosadurga

Government
  - Body: Grama Panchayath

Area
  - Total: 12.67 km^{2} (4.89 sq mi)
- Elevation: 730 m (2,400 ft)

Population (2011)
  - Total: 6,005
  - Density: 474.0/km^{2} (1,228/sq mi)

Languages
  - Official: Kannada
- Time zone: UTC+5:30 (IST)
- PIN: 577597
- Vehicle registration: KA-16

Belagur is a village in the southern state of Karnataka, India. It is located in the Hosadurga taluk of Chitradurga district in Karnataka. Its location code number as per census of India 2011 is, 605986.

== Demographics ==
As of 2001 India census, Belagur had a population of 6071 with 3042 males and 3029 females.

== Temples ==
The main deity of this place is Hanuman called "Veera Prathapa Anjaneya". It is believed to have been installed by Sage Vyasaraya about 750 years ago.

== See also ==
- Chitradurga
- Districts of Karnataka
