= Devanga =

Hindu caste of South India

- Classification: Backward caste
- Religions: Mostly Lingayat sect of Hinduism
- Languages: Kannada, Tamil, Telugu, Malayalam, Tulu, Konkani
- Populated states: Karnataka, Andhra Pradesh, Tamil Nadu, Kerala, Odisha
- Related groups: Padmashali

Devanga (also known as Lingayat Devanga, Devanga Shetty, Devanga Chettiar) is a Hindu caste from South India that traditionally followed the occupation of textile merchandise, weaving and farming mostly found in the Indian states of Karnataka, Kerala, Andhra Pradesh, Tamil Nadu and Odisha.

== Origin and culture ==
The caste claims to be descended from Devala, an ancient Hindu sage. They originated from Andhra Pradesh and Karnataka, and during the reign of the Vijayanagara Empire they migrated to Tamil Nadu. They are of Shudra status in the Hindu caste system. However, they use the Devanga Purana, a text sacred to the Devangas, to claim Brahmin status, despite having a non-Brahmin profession. They replaced their native local gotras with Sanskritic gotras.

Devanga is a Sanskrit word that means "Body of the God".

=== Religion ===
There is a theory that the Devanga and Padmashali communities were once a single entity, with a split arising when the Devanga element took up Shaivite Lingayatism or Veerashaivism while the Padmashalis were Vaishnavs. While some Devangas wear the yagnopaveetam or janivara, others consider the Viramustis as their traditional preceptors, from whom they take precepts and wear lingam.

During the medieval period, the Veerashaiva weavers supported anti-caste movements such as that of Basava. However, that movement itself became consumed with caste superiority against other Veerashaivas and Brahmins (who were non-Veerashaivas). The weavers began claiming higher caste status and claim that in 1231 a king granted them rights that were traditionally accorded to upper castes, such as wearing the sacred thread, riding a palanquin, and displaying a flag.

The main goddess of the Devanga people is Sri Ramalinga Chowdeshwari Amman in the South Karnataka, Andhra and Tamil Nadu regions.

In the Central and North Karnataka regions the main goddess of the Devanga people is Sri Banashankari Amma Temple.

=== Devanga Purana ===
Around 1532, Devangas of the Godavari requested the Telugu poet Bhadralinga Kavi to write their kulapuranam, or mythological history. He composed the Devanga Purana in the dasimatra-dvipadi style. The Godavari Devangas also helped to Sanskrtize Devangas from eastern Andhra.

== Occupation ==
Most members of this community were professional artisans who were specialized in weaving silk apparels with motifs and specialized with brocade, damask and matelassé. They were accordingly primarily concentrated around major textile centres in the Godavari district.

They were known for great craftsmanship in weaving clothes of silk and superfine quality cotton textiles. Weaving the loom is usually done by men whereas women dye the yarn and spin the thread and children assist tasks such as looming. They are also very good entrepreneurs and expert in marketing of clothes. Some of them are also engaged in farming.

== Notable people ==
- P. Theagaraya Chetty - T.Nagar is a locality in Chennai which is named after him.

== Punishment for inter-caste marriage ==
In 2004, the Devanga leaders of a small village in Belagur, Chitradurga district, Karnataka, fined and socially excluded ten families from the community for marrying people outside the caste. The decision was criticised and alleged to be unconstitutional but a similar thing happened to five families in Shivani village, Ajjampura, Chikmagalur district in 2011.
