= Jyoti Ghimire =

Jyoti Ghimire ज्योती घिमिरे
- Born: 28 April; Kathmandu
- Genres: Rock, Pop
- Occupation: Guitarist
- Instrument: Guitar

Jyoti Ghimire(Nepali:ज्योती घिमिरे) is a Nepalese musician, guitarist and singer. He has over 200 recordings with various artists in 80s and 90s. He is considered as one of the musicians to shape contemporary rock and pop music in Nepal via popular songs such as Anjaan, Maski Maski, and Nashalu.

== Biography ==
Ghimire was born in Kathmandu on 29 April. Initially, Ghimire was a football player, playing for Ranipokhari Corner Team, a A-division team of Nepal. However, his focus shifted towards music gradually. He also served as a civil servant in Nepal Telecom in parallel to his music career. His first music show was done on 10 March 1983. He has released several albums and worked in various films as a musician.

== Albums ==
- Dordee- 2001 (Digital release 2014)
- Evolution- 2004
- Timi Aiayinau -2019
