= Jyoti Kiran =

Indian politician

- Born: 31 July 1962 (age 63)
- Education: PhD in economics
- Occupations: Activist, educationist, strategist, politician
- Years active: Since 2000
- Organization: Government of Rajasthan
- Known for: Chairperson of Rajasthan State Finance Commission
- Political party: Bharatiya Janata Party
- Website: Official website

Jyoti Kiran Shukla is an economist. She is the first woman to be the chairperson (with the rank of a state minister) of Rajasthan's Fifth State Finance Commission. She has been on the board of directors of Petronet, NBCC and HSCC. She is the director of an Indian culture centre in Latin America. Later she was an independent director with various corporate and PSUs. She has written books and papers, is a columnist, and runs her own podcast. She was the state spokesperson of the Bharatiya Janata Party, Rajasthan.

== Positions ==
- Chairperson at Rajasthan State Finance Commission, June 2015 to present
- Bharatiya Janata Party, Rajasthan Spokesperson

== Works ==
- Jyoti Kiran at Zee Jaipur Literature Festival 2018

== See also ==
- Bharatiya Janata Party (BJP)
- Rashtriya Swayamsevak Sangh (RSS)
