= Devala =

Hindu sage

In Hinduism, Devala was a rishi or sage. He is mentioned by Arjuna in Bhagavad Gita (10.13).

== Weaver ==
When Devala returned after obtaining threads from Lord Vishnu, a group of five demons attacked him. It is a dark night and the demons were all-powerful. Devala struggled with Vishnu's Chakra and finally prayed to Shakti to protect him. Devi Shakti appeared with fluorescence and glory, wearing a bright Crown, holding Trishula and other weapons in her hands and riding a lion. She killed the demons and their blood was in the colors of white, black, red, green, and yellow. Devala soaked the threads in the demons colorful blood. Later, Devi Shakti was named as Chowdeswari or Sowdeswari (Chowda/Sowda/Sooda means the brightness). She advised Devala to worship her on every new moon night.

Devala went to South Himalaya and owned "Sagara Kingdom" with Amodh Nagar as its capital, wove new clothes and gave them to Trimurti, Tridevi, Deva, Asura, Gandharva, Kinnar, and ordinary people. Devala gave clothes to cover Deva's body parts so his community is named Devanga (Anga=Body part) Community.

== Marriage ==
He married Suryadeva's younger sister Deva Dhutta, becoming Surya's first kinsmen his son from Deva dhutta was Maharishi Shandilya then he married Aadi Shesha's daughter Chandra Rekha. Devanga people are called Sedar/Jendar (Shesha is pronounced as Seda in Tamil). Later he married Asura Vakradanta's daughter Agni Dhutta. People who follow Devala are known as Devanga or Devangar. The main god for Devala is Sri Ramalinga Sowdeswari Amman.

His descendants are known as Devanga.
