= Jyoti (goddess) =

Hindu goddess

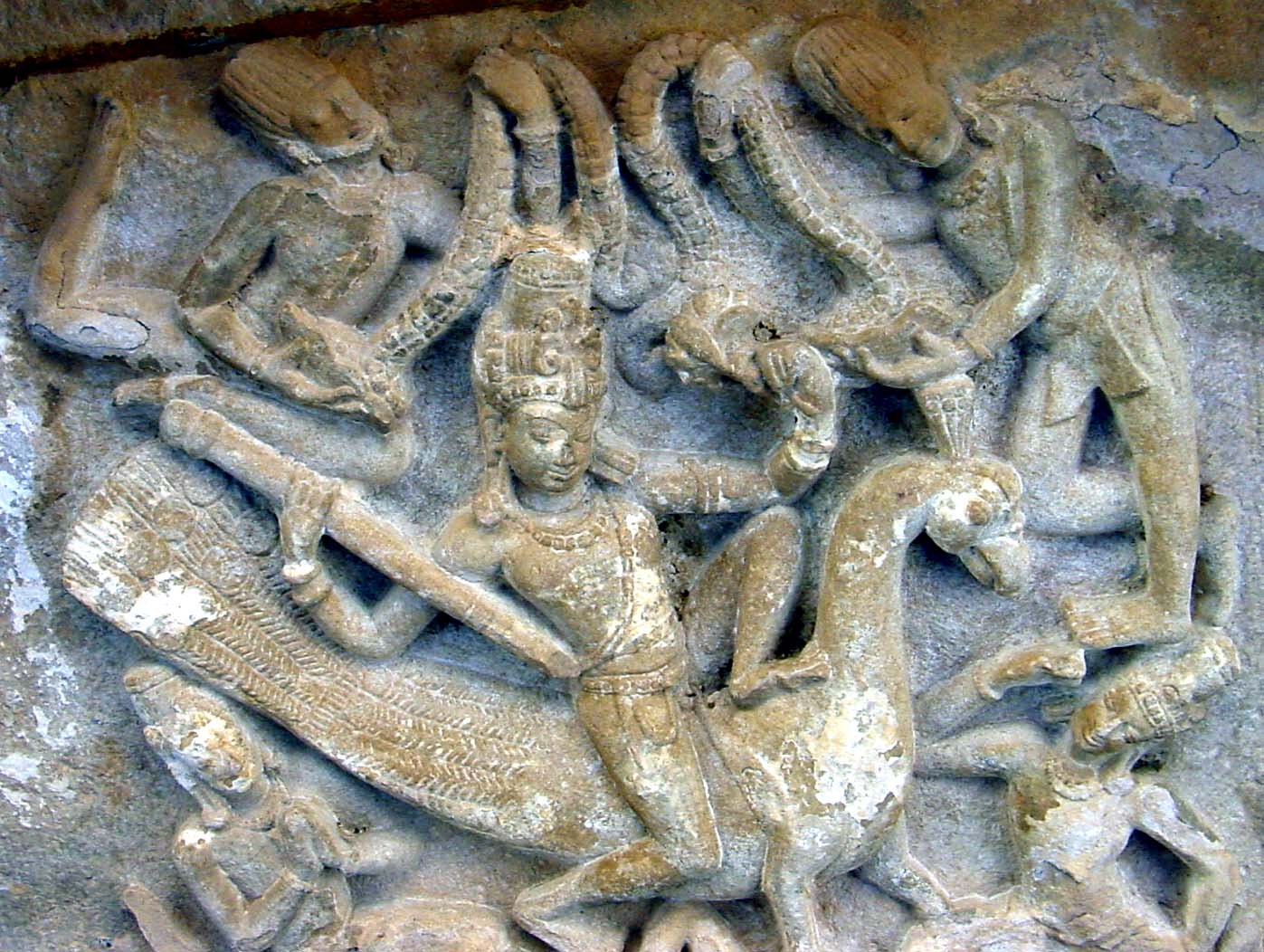
Sculpture of Murugan wielding his vel, identified as Jyoti

In modern Tamil Shaiva tradition, Jyoti is sometimes considered to be the personification of the female principle, an embodied representation of the vel of Murugan.

== Legends ==
The goddess has two different myths based on her birth. In the first myth, she emerges from Shiva's halo, and is a physical manifestation of her father's grace.

In the second myth, she is born from a spark from goddess Parvati's forehead, similar to how Muruga is born from six sparks from Shiva's forehead. From her, the devi fashions a weapon that she presents to her son as a vel. With this weapon, Muruga destroys the asura Surapadman.

It is believed that she is in a formless or arupa state in all of her brother Muruga's temples. She is also thought to be the flame that her father Nataraja (a form of Shiva) holds.

== Worship ==
In Shodasam, a major devotional composition by the sage Agastya, the sage discovers and describes the role of the mother Manonmani, her husband (Shiva in the form Sadisiva) and their daughter Jyoti who are present in the Ajna cakra upon the forehead for each day of the waxing and waning of moon. The sage also recounts that how Jyoti was born of the Pranava pillar of ‘Om'.

The goddess is called Saravanabhavai due to her association with her brother, and is worshipped in her Vel form in many Muruga temples. In some parts of India, she is identified with the goddess Rayaki, who is associated with the Vedic Raka. In North India, she is identified as the goddess Jwalaimukhi.
