= Jyoti swarupini =

Ragam in Carnatic music

Jyotiswarupini
- Arohanam: S R₃ G₃ M₂ P D₁ N₂ Ṡ
- Avarohanam: Ṡ N₂ D₁ P M₂ G₃ R₃ S

Jyotiswarupini (pronounced jyōtiswarūpini) is a ragam in Carnatic music (musical scale of South Indian classical music). It is the 68th Melakarta rāgam in the 72 melakarta rāgam system of Carnatic music. It is the prati madhyamam equivalent of Ragavardhini, which is the 32nd melakarta. It is called Jyōtirāga or Joti or Jyōti in Muthuswami Dikshitar school of Carnatic music.

== Structure and Lakshana ==
Jyotiswarupini scale with shadjam at C

It is the 2nd rāgam in the 12th chakra Aditya. The mnemonic name for this rāgam is Aditya-Sri. The mnemonic phrase is sa ru gu mi pa dha ni. Its ascending and descending scale (ārohaṇa-avarohaṇa structure) is as follows:

- ārohaṇa: S R₃ G₃ M₂ P D₁ N₂ Ṡ (Note: Alternate notations: Hindustani: S G̱ G M̄ P Ḏ Ṉ Ṡ; Western: C D♯ E F♯ G A♭ B♭ C)
- avarohaṇa: Ṡ N₂ D₁ P M₂ G₃ R₃ S (Note: Alternate notations: Hindustani: Ṡ Ṉ Ḏ P M̄ G G̱ S; Western: C B♭ A♭ G F♯ E D♯ C)

See swaras in Carnatic music for details on above notation. The notes used are shatsruthi rishabham, antara gandharam, prati madhyamam, shuddha dhaivatham, kaisiki nishadham.

Jyotiswarupini, being a melakarta rāgam, by definition is a sampoorna rāgam (it has all seven notes in ascending and descending scale).
