= Jyoti Raj =

Indian free solo climber

- Other name: Kothi Raj
- Occupation: Rock climber
- Known for: Rock climbing and rescue operations
- Spouse: Niveditha

Jyoti Raj, also known as Kothi Raj and the Monkey Man, is an Indian rock climber from Chitradurga, Karnataka. He is known for climbing the walls of Chitradurga Fort using his hands and feet, often without conventional climbing equipment. His climbing abilities have earned him the nickname "Spiderman of Karnataka".

== Personal life ==
On 23 August 2026, Raj wed Niveditha, who holds a degree from Dodda Ullarthi village within Challakere taluk, at Vaibhav Garden located in Chitradurga.

== Career ==
Raj gained fame for scaling the stone cliffs at Chitradurga Fort, where he often shows off his skills to tourists. He learned how to climb by watching monkeys and copying their way of holding on and moving over rough ground.

As reported by The New Indian Express, Raj spent over 15 years scaling fort walls up until 2021. In addition to showing off his skills, he started teaching youth how to climb rocks and walls. He offered these lessons free of cost and asked local officials for help building an indoor wall in Chitradurga. His goal was to get young athletes ready for events at national and global levels.

On 13 September 2013, Raj ascended the clock tower located at Moorusavir Math within Hubli in roughly fifteen minutes. He failed to employ a safety harness but utilized climbing chalk to enhance his hold on the surface.

During February 2023, Raj ascended Gadaikallu, which is also referred to as Jamalabad Fort, located within the Belthangady taluk of the Dakshina Kannada district. His upward journey commenced at 9:45 am and concluded upon reaching the peak around noon, during which he carried the Kannada national flag. This ascent had been performed after securing advance authorization and involved utilizing a safety rope for security. According to his own statements, the purpose of this climb was to aid his intentions regarding setting up a training center designed specifically for young climbers.

In April 2026, Pravati Parida, who serves as the Deputy Chief Minister of Odisha, declared that Raj would act as an ambassador for an adventure climbing event scheduled to take place on Mahendragiri within Odisha. This specific project formed one component of broader attempts designed to boost adventure tourism across the state.

== Rescue operations ==
Alongside his mountaineering pursuits, Raj helped recover corpses of individuals who fell into hard-to-reach zones, such as Jog Falls. During a conversation with The New Indian Express back in 2021, he stated that he pulled over 400 remains from various spots, which included nine specifically from Jog Falls.

During February 2018, Raj disappeared while participating in a mission to locate the corpse of a male individual who had tumbled into the Jog Falls zone. He moved down toward the stony ravine alongside additional mountaineers yet ended up stuck inside a limited crevice following a slip upon the stones. He stayed within that spot throughout the night and was found next day early in the morning by recovery groups utilizing aerial camera equipment. He was later transported back to secure conditions.

During August 2026, Raj entered into the search effort concerning Advait Upadhyay, a tech worker based in Bengaluru who vanished while on a solitary hike up Shivagange Hill. Raj utilized safety lines over four days to traverse the rugged and challenging landscape. Other participants included members of the National Disaster Response Force, the State Disaster Response Force, plus various additional emergency responders. Eventually, the ground-level search was terminated after failing to find Upadhyay.
