= Hampi (town) =

Hampi Vijayanagara
- City
- Kishkindha
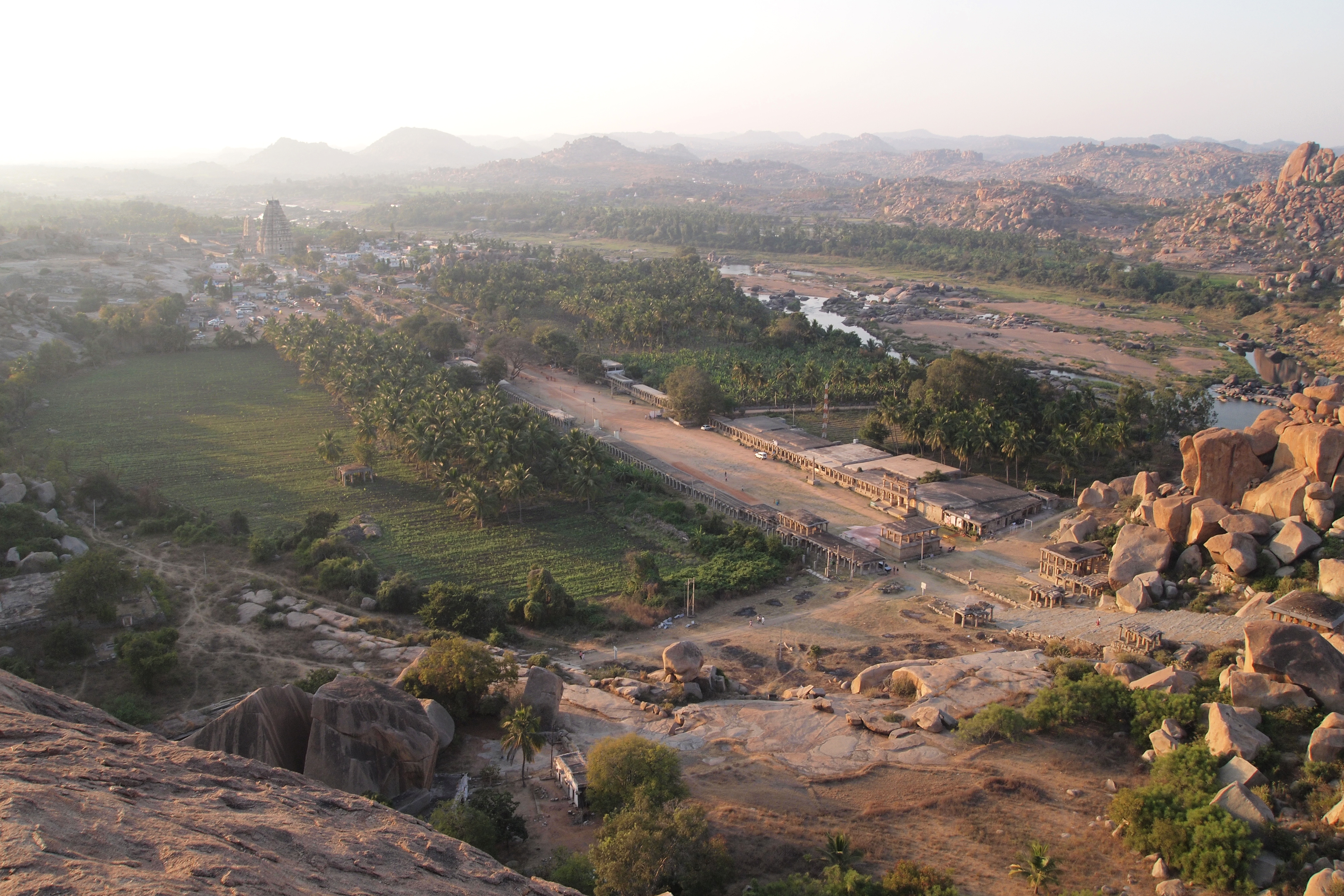

- Location within Karnataka
- Coordinates: 15.335°N 76.462°E
- Country: India
- State: Karnataka
- District: Vijayanagara
- Elevation: 467 m (1,532 ft)

Population (2011)
  - Total: 2,777

Languages
  - Official: Kannada
- Time zone: UTC+5:30 (IST)
- PIN code: 583239
- Nearest city: Hospet

Hampe, also known as Vijayanagara, is a city in the Vijayanagara district in the Indian state of Karnataka. Located along the Tungabhadra River in the eastern and central parts of the state, Hampi is near the city of Hospet. It is famous for hosting the Hampi Group of Monuments with the Virupaksha Temple, a UNESCO World Heritage Site. The city was possibly known as Kishkindha in the Ramayana age.

Hampi is mentioned in Ashokan epigraphy and texts such as the Ramayana and the Puranas of Hinduism as Pampaa Devi Tirtha Kshetra. Hampi was a part of Vijayanagara, the capital of the Hindu Vijayanagara Empire in the 14th-century. It became the centre of economic and administrative activity of the Deccan region kingdom founded in opposition to the Islamic sultanates in South India. After over two centuries of rule, the Empire was defeated and abandoned. Since the 19th century, its ruins have been an important site for archaeologists and historians.

== Geography ==
Hampi (or Hampe) is situated on the banks of the Tungabhadra River, amid rocky hills. It is 348 kilometres (216 mi) from Bangalore, 385 kilometres (239 mi) from Hyderabad and 266 kilometres (165 mi) from Belgaum. The closest railway station is in the city of Hospet (Hosapete), 13 km away, and the closest airport is Jindal Vijaynagar Airport in Toranagallu, 32 kilometres (20 mi) away, which has connections to Bengaluru. Overnight buses and trains also connect Hampi with Goa and Bengaluru.

== Economic activity ==
The principal economic activities in and around the town include agriculture, tourism and industrial activity related to iron ore, manganese and other minerals mining. The average rainfall around Hampi town is about 660 mm but continues to vary due to the impacts of climate change. The major crops grown are paddy, maize, jowar, bajra, groundnut, sunflower, sugarcane and cotton. Some of the Hampi farmlands are irrigated and there is a large dam nearby.

=== Tourism ===
Hampi hosts, in part, a group of monuments that UNESCO has declared a world heritage site. Every year, over 700,000 tourists visit Hampi.

In and after the 1960s, the town became an attraction for motorbikers and a site for offbeat tourism when its infrastructure was in poor condition. Groups of tourists would gather on its hills and amidst its ruins to hold parties and spiritual retreats. These have been called "Hampi Hippies" and Hampi has been referred to as the "lost city" in some publications.

The annual Hampi Utsava or "Vijaya Festival" has been celebrated since the reign of Vijayanagara. It is organised by the Government of Karnataka as Nada Habba (Festival).

=== Climate ===
Climate data for Hampi
Month	Jan	Feb	Mar	Apr	May	Jun	Jul	Aug	Sep	Oct	Nov	Dec	Year
Mean daily maximum °C (°F)	30.9 (87.6)	33.5 (92.3)	36.5 (97.7)	37.9 (100.2)	37.5 (99.5)	33.2 (91.8)	30.8 (87.4)	31.0 (87.8)	31.2 (88.2)	31.4 (88.5)	30.5 (86.9)	29.9 (85.8)	32.9 (91.1)
Mean daily minimum °C (°F)	18.1 (64.6)	19.9 (67.8)	22.5 (72.5)	23.6 (74.5)	24.9 (76.8)	23.9 (75.0)	23.3 (73.9)	22.9 (73.2)	22.5 (72.5)	21.9 (71.4)	19.9 (67.8)	17.8 (64.0)	21.8 (71.2)
Average precipitation mm (inches)	0 (0)	0 (0)	2 (0.1)	24 (0.9)	58 (2.3)	61 (2.4)	87 (3.4)	90 (3.5)	129 (5.1)	123 (4.8)	25 (1.0)	16 (0.6)	615 (24.1)
Source: Climate data: Hampi

== See also ==
- Anegundi
- Hampi Group of Monuments
