= Chowdeshwari Temple =

Temple in Karnataka, India

Coordinates: 13°16′41.8″N 76°28′40.5″E

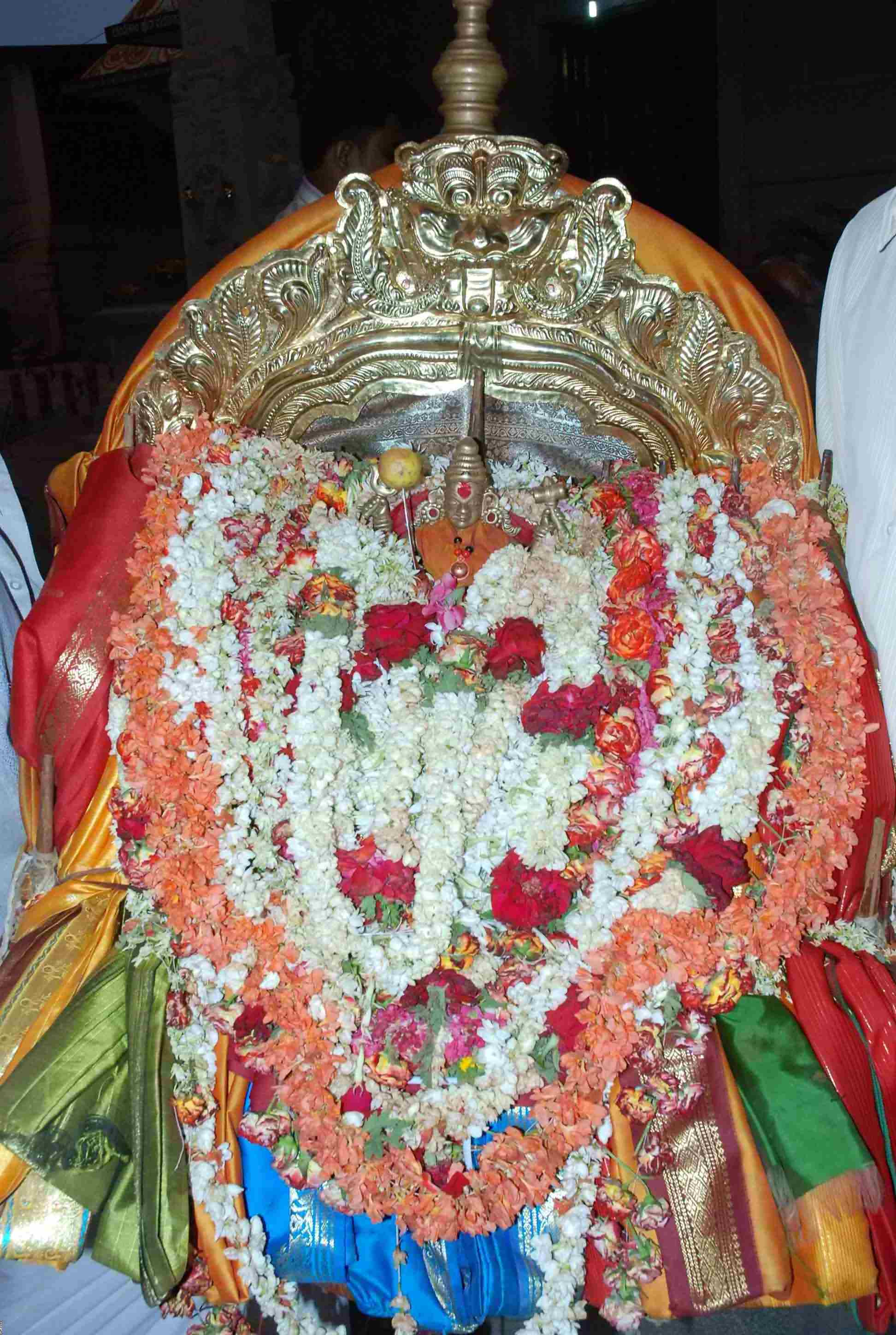
Chowdeshwari Devi

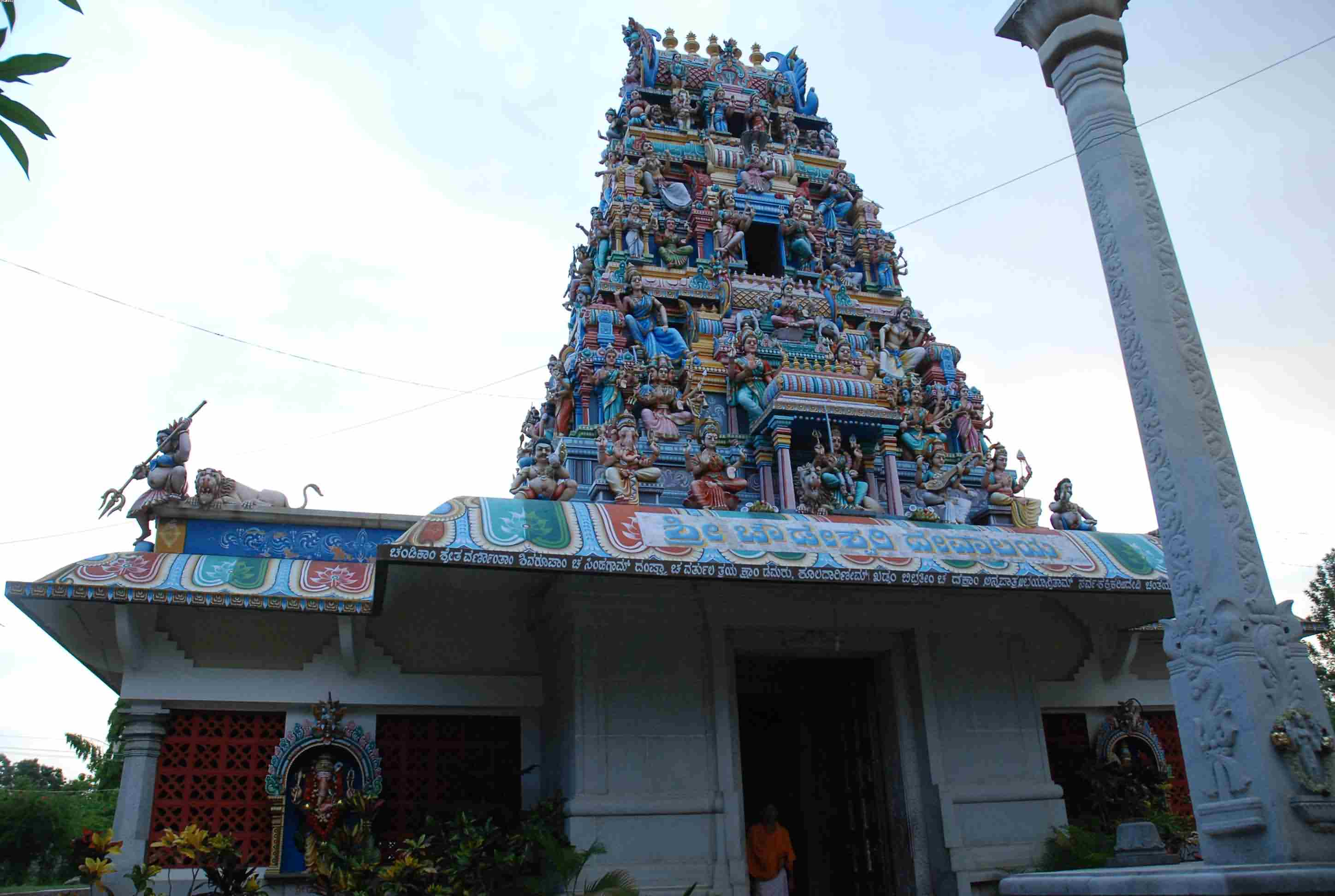
Chowdeshwari Temple Entrance view

This is a temple dedicated to Sri Ramalinga Chowdeswari Ammanavaru, as Chowdeshwari Devi.

== Travel ==
=== Road ===
Dasarighatta is about 10 km from Tiptur. One can reach Tiptur via Tumkur from Bangalore. Bus service is provided from Tiptur to Dasarighatta by the KSRTC Karnataka State Road Transport Corporation.

=== Rail ===
One can reach Tiptur via Tumkur from Bangalore. Service is provided from Bangalore City Railway Station & Yeshwanthpur Railway Station by the IRCTC Indian Railways Catering and Tourism Corporation.

=== To Reach Dasarighatta From Tiptur ===
There is no railway service from Tiptur to Dasarighatta. To reach Dasarighatta, KSRTC provided bus from Tiptur to Dasarighatta. Distance is about 10 km from Dasarighatta to Tiptur.

== Temple working hours ==
Weekdays and Weekends (except Tuesday): 9 a.m. to 9 p.m.

Tuesday: 9 a.m. to 9:30 a.m. and 12 p.m. to 9 p.m.

== Special Sevas ==
Every Tuesday - Special Pooja.
Vishesha Pooja -NavaRaathri Pooja during navaraathri(Check out navaraathri videos).
Chowdeshwari Devi Utsava on specific festival days i.e. during Ayudha Pooja & Chowdeshwari Devi Fair.
