= Gasparo Balbi =

Gasparo Balbi was an Italian jeweller, merchant, and author from Venice, who is best known for his account of his travels to India and the East from 1579 to 1588. He mainly travelled with Portuguese merchant and naval vessels and to forts and trading posts owned by or friendly to that country's commerce. His story, published in 1590 in Venice, was titled Voyage to the Oriental Indies.

== Itinerary ==
His travels began in Cyprus, from where he moved to Aleppo, then to Babylon and Basra, and on to the Portuguese fort of Hormuz.

From there he embarked over water, past the Portuguese fort of Dibba (Debe) to the post at Diu, from there to Daman, and then to the walled city of Chiauul (Chaul), then Goa, then Cocchi, through Cananor (Cannanore) and Onor. He travelled to Negapatan (Nagapattinam), then to São Tomé and then to Pegu. He visited Dala, Dogon and the ruins of Sirian (Syriam), Meccao, and Silon. He went then to Maraban, Malacca. and from there to Cocchi (Kingdom of Cochin). He visited the Portuguese fortress of Colombo in Seilan (Ceylon, now Sri Lanka). He returned via Hormuz, Basra, and Babylon.

== Selected observations ==
He visited the temple of Alefanta (Elephanta Caves) near what is today Bombay, and attributed its construction to Alexander the Great. The ships on which he traveled had to fight off corsairs from the Malabar Coast.

There is little analysis or confession in the account; it is often a dry businessman's observation of places and their contents. As a merchant discussing the mechanics of trade, he detailed the various exchange rates for coins in Basra, Goa and Negapatan, including silver Serafini (Xerafims), Venetian Liri, and Gold Zecchini. He described how merchants used the abacus for calculations, and their units of measurement. In Cocchi, he was able to see the arrival of a merchant ship from China, and the emperor-sponsored preaching of Christianity by the Jesuits in China.

Near San Thome and other sites in India, he observed the rites of suttee. In Negapatan he watched the funeral rites for the king: women of his harem and some of his subjects willingly throwing themselves under the wheels of the funeral carriage procession to sacrifice their lives. He made numerous observations on Hindu rites. He described people drowning themselves in the Ganges to gain paradise. He claimed Brahmin priests in Cochin could exert licentiousness with women in the province, rich or poor, married or single.

His account, often cursory, seems to stress the barbarity of the place and his abhorrence of non-Christian religions, often deriding them as devil-worship. He found as much to fear from man as from animals and noted frequently the danger from man-eating tigers. In the Andaman Islands, he visited an island named Carnalcubar, which he said was populated by savage cannibals.

He described the four white elephants kept by the king of Pegù and how wild elephants were caught and domesticated. He described marriage ceremonies and festivities. He described harsh physical punishments, including castration, for different immoral offences. He witnessed the king of Pegu, after a war, putting four thousand town inhabitants, men, women and children, to death by fire. He states he watched it with great compassion and pain, seeing young blameless angels suffer martyrdom. In another anecdote, from 1583, Nadabayin, then king of Pegu, inquired from Balbi as to who was the king of Venice. Balbi replied that there was no king, and that it is governed as a republic and not dominated by any king. Taken by such a great marvel, this king began to laugh in such fashion that he was overcome with coughing and he said it gave him great displeasure (for me) to have said such to great persons like him.

While Marco Polo's travels were, by then, centuries old; Balbi's commentary is generally contemporary with travels by the fellow-Venetian Niccolò de' Conti and Cesare Federici. The Genoese Hieronymo di San Stefano and Varthema of Bologna, occurred at the beginning of the 16th century. The more eloquent tale of Gemelli Careri in Giro del Mondo would be over a century later.

== Sources ==
- Balbi, Gasparo (1610). Notes: Reproduction of original from Goldsmiths' Library, University of London. (ed.). Viaggio dell'Indie Orientali. Venice: Camillo Borgominieri.
