= Medieval city of Vijayanagara =

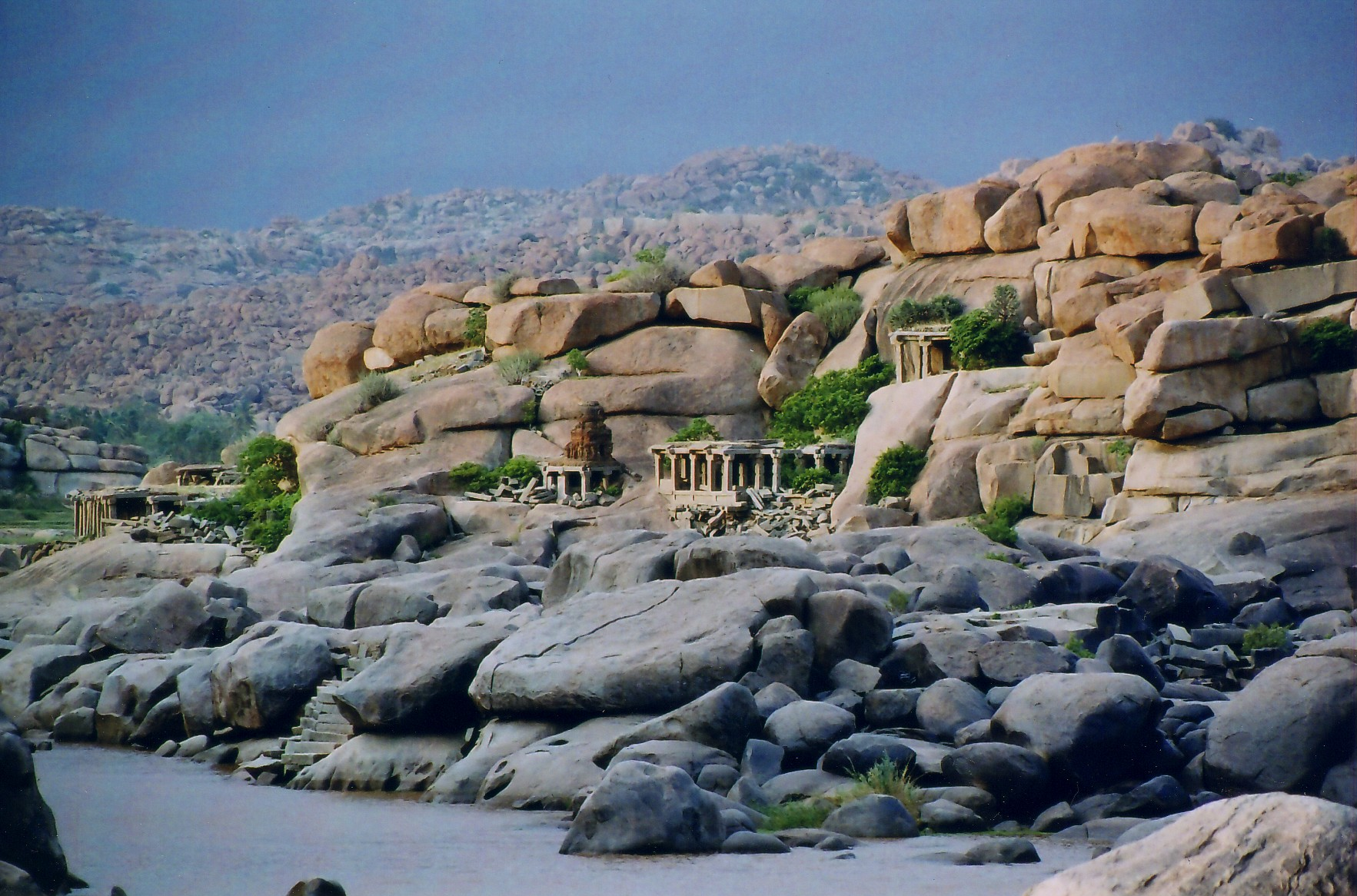
Natural fortress, Vijayanagara

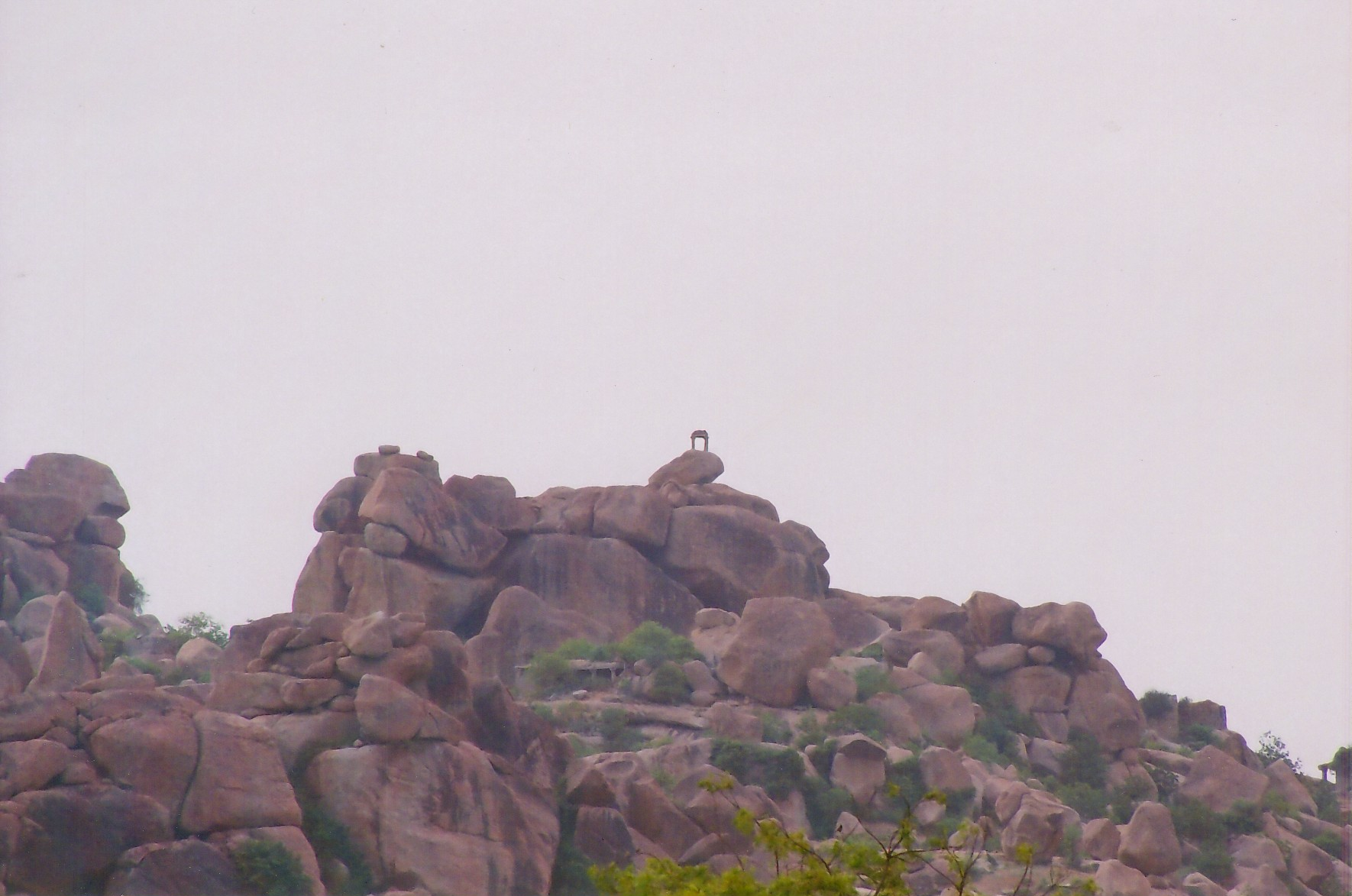
A sentry post, Vijayanagar area

The city of Vijayanagara was the urban core of the imperial city and the surrounding principalities of the capital of the Vijayanagara Empire during the 14th to 16th centuries. Notes by foreign travellers such as Abdur Razzak, the Persian who visited Vijayanagara in 1440, mention seven fortifications before the gates to the royal palace. The large area between the first and third fortifications contained agricultural fields, gardens and residences. The notes of Robert Sewell describe countless shops and bazaars (markets) filled with people from different nationalities between this fortification and the palace.

== In medieval literature ==
The capital city of the Vijayanagara Empire was founded on the banks of the Tungabhadra River by Harihara I and Bukka Raya I in the early 14th century. The capital city grew with extraordinary rapidity in the early decades of Sangama rule and became one of the biggest cities in the world of the 15th and 16th centuries. The capital city had splendid layout with forts, palaces, gardens and temples in it. The construction of major irrigation works during the 15th century under Emperor Deva Raya and under Emperor Krishna Deva Raya in the early 16th century was one of the main reasons why the city flourished and expanded. Several foreign travelers visited the city in the 15th and 16th century and were impressed by the magnificence of the city. The Persian traveler Abdur Razzak who visited the capital city in the 15th century described the city with the following words:" The city of Vijayanagar is such that the pupil of the eye has never seen a place like it, and the ear of intelligence has never been informed that there existed anything to equal it in the world" The Portuguese traveler Domingo Paes says of the city: " This is the best provided city in the world." Domingo Paes was overwhelmed by the city and stated:" The people in the city are countless in number, so much so that I do not wish to write it down for fear it should be thought fabulous. What I saw seemed as large as Rome and very beautiful to the sight; there are many groves of trees within it, many orchards and gardens of fruit trees and many conduits of water which flow in the midst of it, and in places there are lakes." The Italian traveler Nicolo Conti who visited the city in 1420 CE, estimated the circumference of the city to be sixty miles and was impressed by the strength of its fortifications.

== Excavations ==
Recent excavations have unearthed archaeological artifacts dating from the 3rd century BC to early in the 2nd millennium, documenting evidence from over seven hundred important sites. These sites include ash mounds, ancient settlements, megalithic cemeteries, temples and rock art. These findings show that the Vijayanagar area was densely settled for a long period before the creation of the empire.

=== Land ===
Starting at its outermost fortifications, the principality of Vijayanagar spans from Anegondi in the north to Hosapete in the south and covers a total area of 650 km². Vijayanagara's core, an area of 25 km², includes the Tungabhadra River flowing through rocky terrain with huge boulders piled in massive formations. In addition to this naturally daunting landscape, builders constructed fortifications surrounding the regal city in several layers. The rocky hillocks made excellent sentinel points for watch towers and granite boulders provided the raw material for temple construction. South of the river the rocky landscape disappears, replaced by flat cultivable land where large and small temples complexes were built. The largest human populations were located to the south of the irrigated lands that were watered by a system of clever ducts and anecut (dams) channelling water to the capital from the river. At its peak, Vijayanagara may have had up to a million residents.

=== Zoning ===
For the sake of simplicity archaeologists have divided the capital area into many zones. Of these, the major two zones are the Sacred Centre and the Royal Centre. The former, generally spread along the south bank, is characterized by the highest concentration of religious structures. The Royal Centre is notable for its stately structures, both civil and military. The very seat of power of the empire was located at the core of this area.

Islamic Quarter also sometimes called, as the Moorish Quarter is located between the northern slope of the Malyavanta hill towards and the Talarigatta Gate. According to the archaeologists, high-ranking Muslim officers of the king's court and the military officers stayed in this area.

=== Legends ===
Two important legends associated with Hampi, the core area of Vijayanagar, had an important part in making it a pilgrim destination for several centuries prior to the Vijayanagara era. One legend describes a Goddess, Pampa, who married Virupaksha (Lord Shiva) on the Hemakuta Hill and was thereafter considered to be an incarnation of Parvati. From Pampa came the name Pampe or (in Kannada) Hampe. The other legend draws on the Hindu epic Ramayana in which Lord Rama and his brother, Lakshmana, searched for Sita in the vicinity of the ancient capital of Kishkindha and met Hanuman on Rishyamuka Hill. Sugreeva, the monkey king in exile, and Rama made a covenant to mutually help each other find Sita and get rid of the evil King Vali. This agreement is celebrated by the presence of a temple in which are icons of Lord Rama, Lakshmana and Sugreeva. Hanuman, the devout follower of Rama, is said to have been born on Anjenadri Hill near the Tungabhadra river facing Hampi. Hence his name is Anjaneya. Archaeology traces the history of Hampi to Neolithic settlements while inscriptional evidence confirms that in more recent times the area came under the rule of the Chalukyas, Rashtrakutas, Hoysalas and finally the tiny kingdom of Kampili.

The legendary association of this area with Lord Virupaksha (Harihara and Bukka Raya being of Shaiva faith) and Lord Rama (the personification of the perfect king) was not lost on the empire's founders. Its natural ruggedness and inaccessibility must have been additional reasons to choose this location for the capital of the new empire. During the empire's rule, Vijayanagara was known as one of the most beautiful cities in India. A copper plate inscription (Tamarashasana) of Marappa (one of the Sangama brothers) is dated 1346 and traces the Sangama genealogy, identifying the Sangama family deity (gotradhidaivam) as Lord Virupaksha of Hampi. Inscriptions attesting to the elevation of Lord Virupaksha to Rashtra devata (God of the Kingdom) have been found. By the time of Bukka I, the capital had already grown into a great capital and inscriptions call it great Nagari named Vijaya situated in Hemakuta.

=== Forts and roads ===
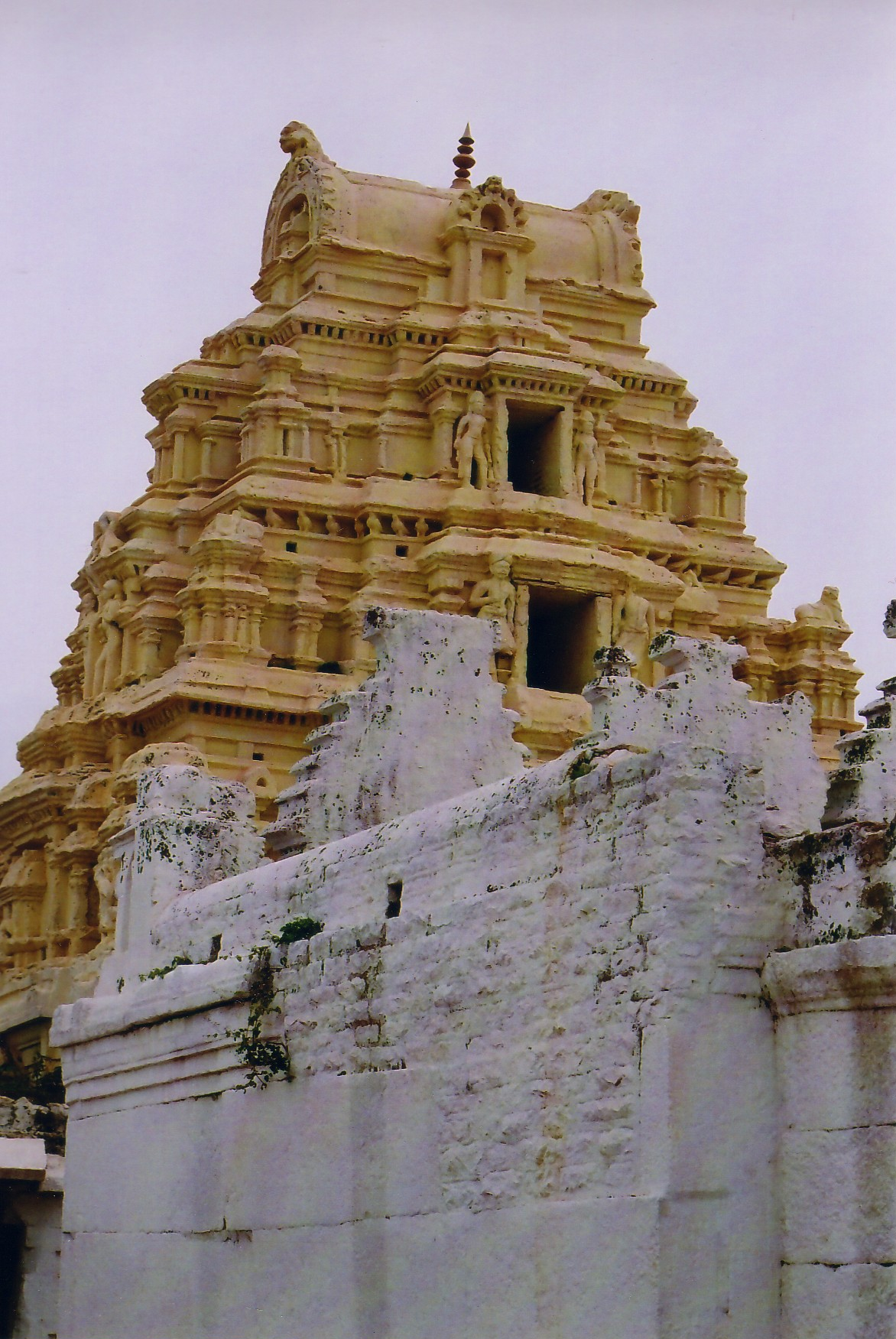
Temple in outer fortification

The Vijayanagar empire created its cities primarily for protection against invasion. The city itself was a fortress and designed as such in every possible way. It was built of massive stone and earthen walls, with hilltop fortresses and watch towers scattered across its length and breadth. Visitors to the city, irrespective of their guild and intention, had to travel through a heavily fortified and protected area before reaching the main urban core which gave them an ample view of the might that protected the empire. Massive fortifications stood at every possible entry into the main metropolitis and in other crucial locations. Additional defensive features were watch posts and bastions located along roads, gates and hilltops that provided maximum visibility.

The capital was the political nerve centre of the empire as well as a center of commerce and pilgrimage. Envoys from other kingdoms, merchants, pilgrims, soldiers and ordinary people all travelled about in the great city on its extensive network of roads. Research has shown over 80 transportation related sites linked by several broad roads about 30 to 60 m wide that were the major transport routes into the city core. Smaller roads, less than 10 m wide, led to temples, settlements and irrigation fields. All major roadways could be monitored from watch towers, gates and rest houses.

=== Urban settlements ===
The greater metropolitan region of the city was inhabited by royalty, imperial officers, soldiers, agriculturists, craftsman, merchants, labourers among others. Literary sources from this era testify to the presence of large military encampments on the city's outskirts. Outside the metropolis, walled towns and villages were scattered about the countryside. Some settlements may have been populated by only a few thousand people while others were large enough to hold ten to fifteen thousand residents. Each settlement had multiple shrines and temples. Numerous Vijayanagar period relics have been lost due to the inhabitation of these settlements by modern-day settlers.

=== Agriculture and craft ===
While today the city's landscape appears to be barren, there is recorded evidence of extensive deforestation and numerous agricultural activities. This suggests that the landscape has changed dramatically. Virtually all available arable land was irrigated using a variety of innovative methods. A significant percentage of the population was involved in agriculture, making the city self-sufficient for food. This enabled it to withstand long sieges, of which there were many during the empire's three century long existence. Numerous canals were dug to provide a perennial water supply to the narrow strip of fertile land bordering the Tungabhadra River. Many of these canals are still in use today though they usually have been modified to meet current requirements. Many of the tanks (bunds) created for water storage purposes like the Kamalapura tank are still in use. Excavation of the Intensive Survey Area has shown the presence of sixty water reservoir embankments. Numerous other agricultural features such as check dams, erosion control walls and wells have been recorded. The net result of these systems was a complex agricultural landscape characterized by a multitude of agricultural regimes appropriate to the complex topography, resources, needs and differing populations.

Sandur, which formed the southern boundary of the greater metropolitan region, is still known today for iron and haematite ores. Iron slag and other metallurgical debris have been documented at more than thirty sites. Of these, five sites have been dated to the Vijayanagar period and contain iron smelting workshops.

=== Sacred sites ===
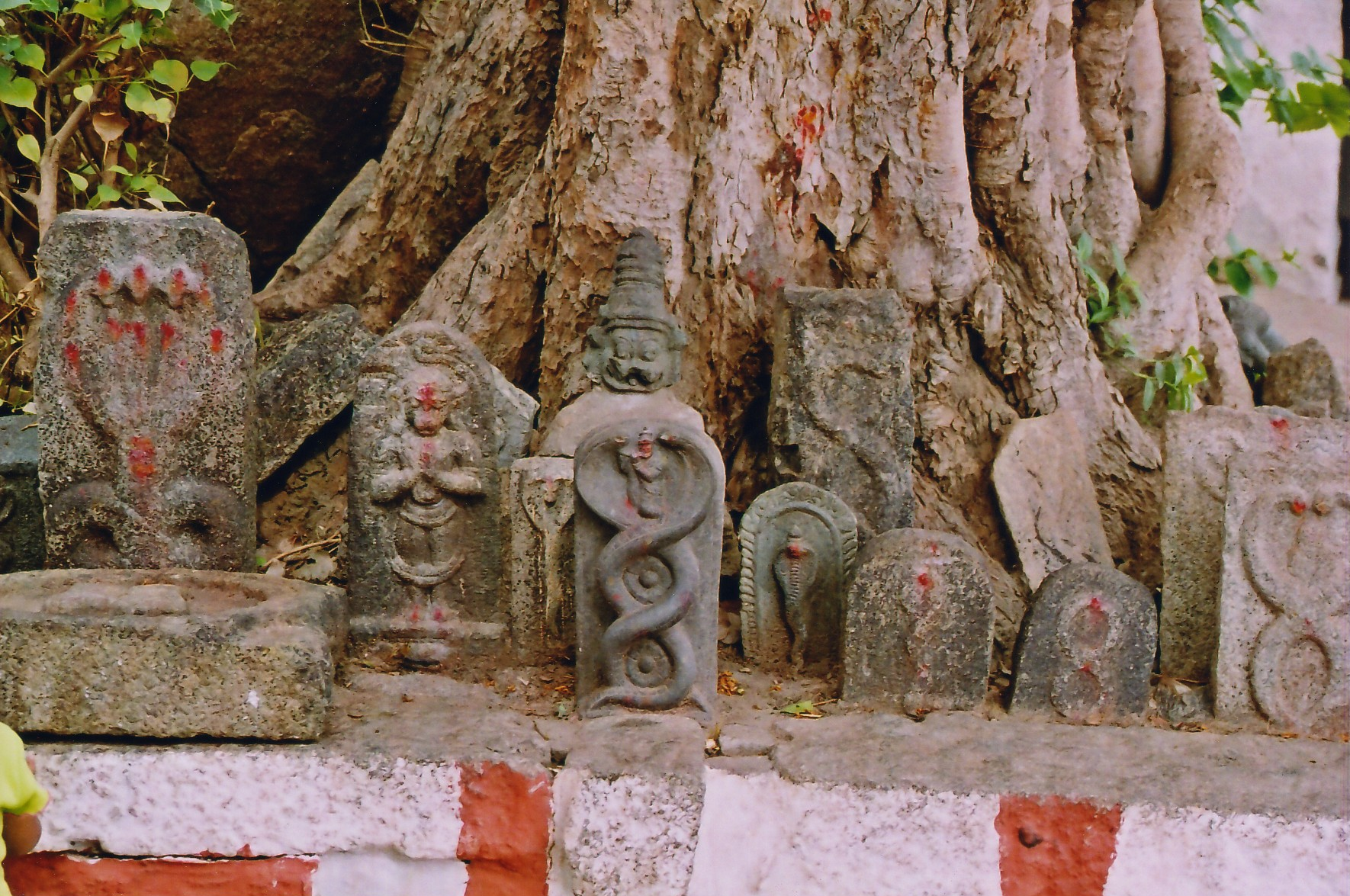
A Vijayanagara naga stone

As well as being a bustling commercial and military encampment, the metropolitan area had over one hundred and forty sacred sites, making it an important centre of religion and religious pilgrimage. Along with temples, numerous sacred images and structures have been recorded in residential and defensive sites. Sacred sites include large temples with towering gopuras, such as the Mallikarjuna temple in the town of Mallappanagudi located on the main road connecting modern Hosapete and Vijayanagara and built in the period of Deva Raya I. There are many smaller temples and shrines. Even more numerous are the images of deities carved into boulder and slab surfaces as well as hero stones (virgal) which were also considered sacred. Sculpted icons of Hanuman, Bhairava, Virabhadra and goddesses in various forms are also frequently seen as well as images from folk traditions such as naga stones (snake stones) linked with woman's ritual activities. Tombs associated with Muslim inhabitants of the city are also present.
