= Cesare Federici =

Venetian explorer

- Born: c. 1530; Erbanno, Republic of Venice
- Died: 1600/03
- Citizenship: Italian
- Occupations: Merchant, traveler, writer
- Known for: Accounts of travels to India and Asia (1563–1581)

Cesare Federici (c. 1530 – 1600/03) was an Italian merchant and traveler.

Federici was born at Erbanno, in what is now the province of Brescia, then under the rule of the Republic of Venice.

In 1563, he visited India and spent eighteen years in commercial pursuits and travels on the southern coasts and islands of Asia. He started from Cyprus and made his way to Aleppo and by caravan with Armenians and Moors to Bir on Euphrates then Feluchia (Fallujah), and Babylon. He then went downriver to Basra and then the island of Hormuz, where a Portuguese fort existed. He describes the election of a Muslim king, who swore fealty to the Portuguese. The fort and market were bustling with people from all parts of the world and included the export of horses to India. At Hormuz, water and wood were supplied from Persia.

He subsequently travelled throughout India, visiting mostly coastal forts and towns, on the west and east coasts. Most of these were owned by, friendly with, or trading with the Portuguese, including Goa, Diu, Cambaia (Khambhat), Daman, Basain, Tana, Chiaul (Chaul), Bezeneger (Vijayanagara), Onor (Honnavar), Mangalor (Mangalore), Barzelor (Basrur), and Canannore (Kannur). Crangenor (Kondungallur), and Cochin.

Of Kannur, he noted it as being ruled by a gentle king and serving as a hub of the cardamon trade. He noted the population's habit of chewing Betel.

He wrote about pearl diving off the coasts from Cao Comeri to Baste de Chilao (the Adam's Bridge, baixos de Chilão in Portuguese) and Ceylon. He discusses the politics of Ceylon and the limited control that the Portuguese had over only the town of Colombo.

He went to Negapatan (Nagapattinam) and San Tome (Mylapore). Traveling on a Portuguese galleon, he passed the Andaman Islands, inhabited by "people of the jungle". In northeastern India, he visited Orifa (Orissa), the city of Satagan (Satgaon) in Bengal on the Gulf of Martavan (Martaban), and Sion (Sirian), a city conquered by the king of Pegu. He sailed to Malacca and passed the channel of Nicobar to the island of Sumatra.

He returned through Baghdad and Aleppo to Europe and landed again at Venice in November, 1581. He then wrote in Italian an account of his voyages, published at Venice in 1587.

While Marco Polo's travels were centuries old by Federici's time, the latter explorer is generally contemporary with travels by the fellow Venetian Niccolò de' Conti and Gasparo Balbi. The Genoese Hieronymo di San Stefano and Varthema of Bologna occurred at the beginning of the 16th century. The more eloquent tale of Gemelli Careri in Giro del Mondo would be over a century later.

== Works ==
- The voyage and travaile into the East India: London 1588 Theatrum Orbis Terrarum New York: Da Capo, 1971.
