= Abd al-Razzaq Samarqandi =

Persian Timurid islamic scholar, diplomat and historian

- Born: Kamal-ud-Din Abd-ur-Razzaq ibn Ishaq Samarqandi; 7 November 1413; Herat, Timurid Empire (now Afghanistan)
- Died: August 1482 (aged 68); Herat, Timurid Empire (now Afghanistan)
- Occupations: Chronicler, Islamic scholar
- Writing career
- Language: Persian
- Notable work: Matla-us-Sadain wa Majma-ul-Bahrain

Abd-al-Razzāq Samarqandī (Persian: کمال‌الدین عبدالرزاق بن اسحاق سمرقندی, Kamal-ud-Din Abd-ur-Razzaq ibn Ishaq Samarqandi; 7 November 1413 – August 1482) was a Persian Timurid chronicler and Islamic scholar. He was for a while the ambassador of Shah Rukh, the Timurid dynasty ruler of Persia. In his role as ambassador he visited Kozhikode in south India in the early 1440s. He wrote a narrative of what he saw in Calicut which is valuable as information on Calicut's society and culture. He is also the producer of a lengthy narrative or chronicle of the history of the Timurid dynasty and its predecessors in Central Asia, but this is not so valuable because it is mostly a compilation of material from earlier written sources that are mostly available from elsewhere in the earlier form.

== Early life ==
Abd-al-Razzāq was born in Herat on 7 November 1413. His father Jalal-ud-Din Ishaq was the qazi and imam of the Shah Rukh's court in Herat. He studied with his father and his elder brother Sharif-ud-Din Abdur Qahhar and together with them obtained an ijazah (license) from Shams-ud-Din Mohammad Jazari in 1429. After the death of his father in 1437, he was appointed the qazi of the Shah Rukh's court.

== Travel and writing ==
Abd-al-Razzāq was the ambassador of Shah Rukh, the Timurid dynasty ruler of Persia to Kozhikode, India, from January 1442 to January 1445. He wrote a 45-page narrative of this mission to India. It appears as a chapter in his book Matla-us-Sadain wa Majma-ul-Bahrain (مطلع السعدين ومجمع البحرين) (The Rise of the Two auspicious constellations and the Confluence of the Two Oceans), a book of about 450 pages which contains a detailed chronicle of the history of his part of the world from 1304 to 1470 and which takes much of its contents from other writings.

Abd-al-Razzāq's narrative of his visit to India includes describing the life and events in Calicut under the Zamorin and also of the Ancient City of Vijayanagara at Hampi during the reign of Deva Raya II, describing their wealth and immense grandeur. He also left accounts of the shipping trade in the Indian Ocean during the 15th century.

Abd-al-Razzāq's Matla-us-Sadain wa Majma-ul-Bahrain also included a detailed account of diplomatic relations between Shah Rukh's state and Ming China.

In particular, it incorporated the first-hand account the mission Shah Rukh sent to Beijing in 1420–1422, written by its participant Ghiyāth al-dīn Naqqāsh.
