= Vijayanagara =

City in Karnataka, India

- City
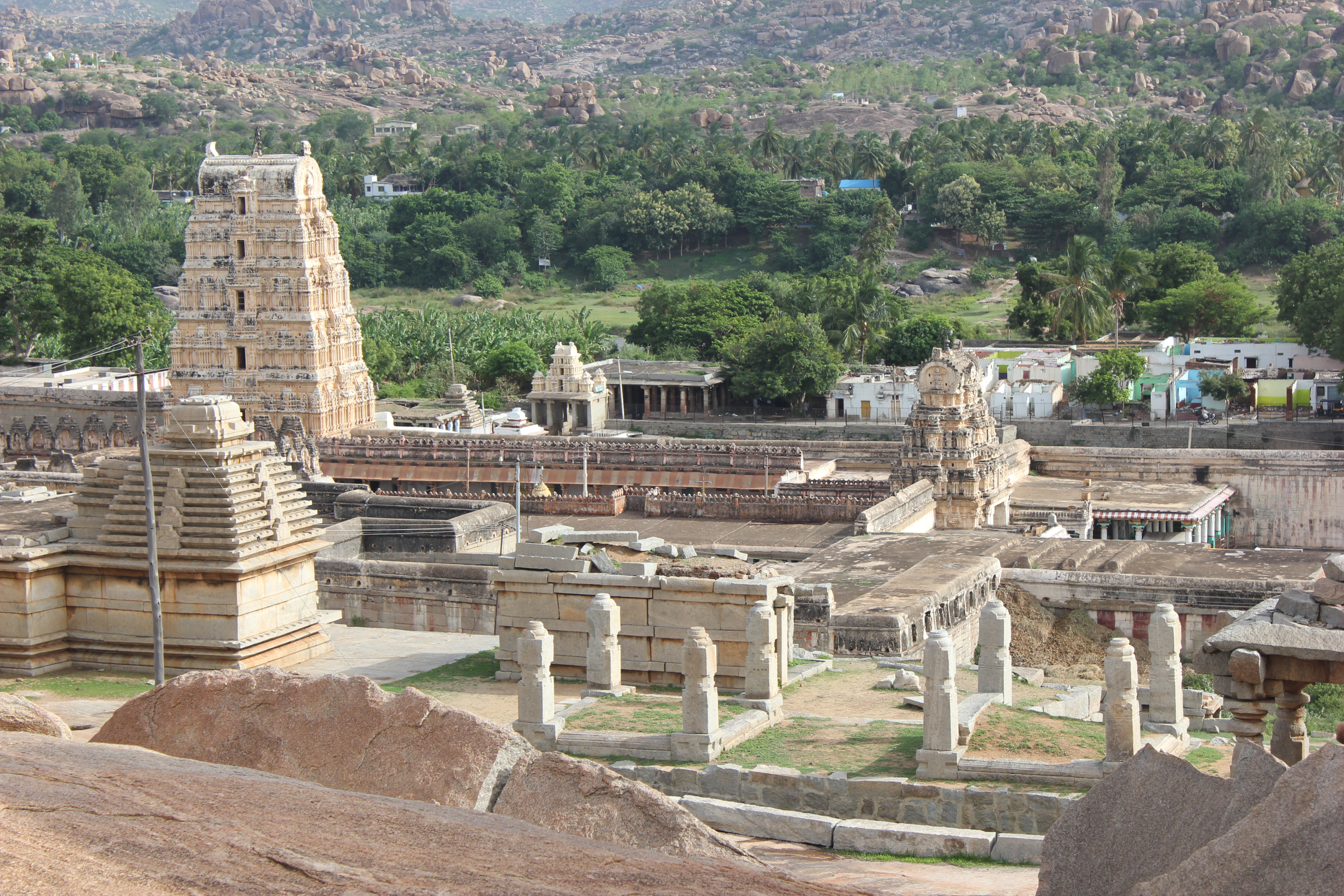
- Virupaksha Temple, Vijayanagara, Karnataka

- Location in Karnataka, India Vijayanagara (India)
- Coordinates: 15°20′00″N 76°27′36″E
- Country: India
- State: Karnataka
- District: Vijayanagara
- Founder: Harihara and Bukka
- Named for: City of Victory

Groups of Monuments at Hampi
UNESCO World Heritage Site
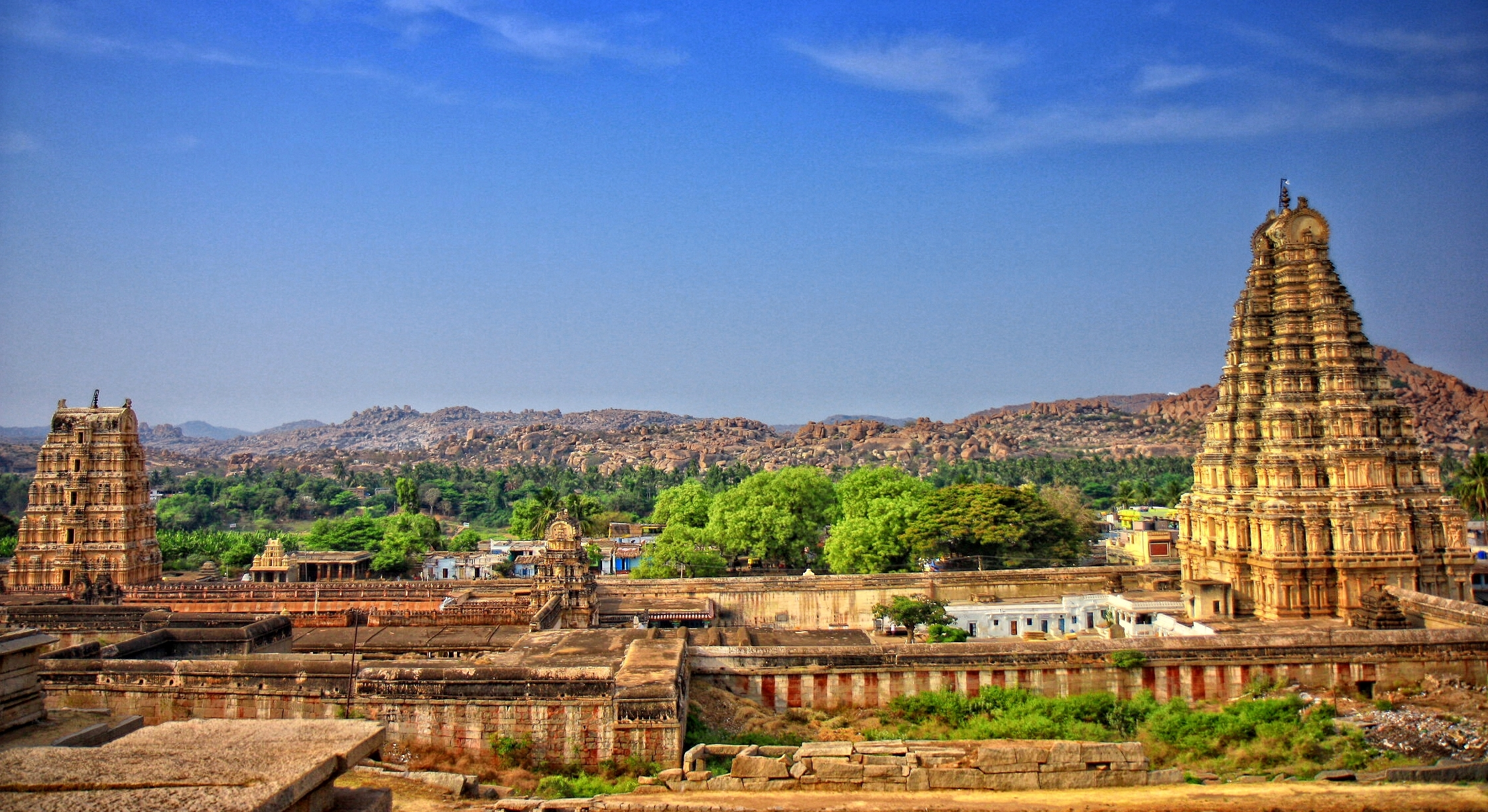

- Location within Karnataka Location within India
- Location: Hampi (City), Vijayanagara district, Karnataka, India
- Includes: Virupaksha Temple
- Criteria: Cultural: i, iii, iv
- Reference: 241
- Inscription: 1986 (10th Session)
- Endangered: 1999–2006
- Area: 4,187.24 ha (10,346.9 acres)
- Buffer zone: 19,453.62 ha (48,070.9 acres)
- Website: Archaeological Survey of India – Hampi
- Coordinates: 15°20′04″N 76°27′44″E

Vijayanagara (transl. 'City of Victory') was the capital city of the historic Vijayanagara Empire. Located on the banks of the Tungabhadra River, it spread over a large area and included sites in the Vijayanagara district, the Ballari district, and others around these districts. A part of Vijayanagara ruins known as the Group of Monuments at Hampi has been designated as a UNESCO World Heritage Site.

Hampi, an ancient human settlement mentioned in Hindu texts, houses pre-Vijayanagara temples and monuments. In the early 14th century, the dominant Kakatiyas, Seuna Yadavas, Hoysalas, and the short-lived Kampili kingdom, who inhabited the Deccan region, were invaded and plundered by armies of Khalji and later Tughlaq dynasties of the Delhi Sultanate.

Vijayanagara was founded from these ruins by the Sangama brothers, who were working as soldiers in the Kampili Kingdom under Kampalidevaraya. The city grew rapidly. The Vijayanagara-centred empire functioned as a barrier to the Muslim sultanates in the north, leading to the reconstruction of Hindu life and scholarship, multi-religious activity, rapid infrastructure improvements, and economic activity. Along with Hinduism, Vijayanagara accepted communities of other faiths such as Jainism and Islam, leading to multi-religious monuments and mutual influences. Chronicles left by Persian and European travellers state Vijayanagara to be a prosperous and wealthy city.

By 1500 CE, Hampi-Vijayanagara was the world's second largest medieval era city (after Beijing) and probably India's richest at that time, attracting traders from Persia and Portugal.

Wars between nearby Muslim sultanates and Hindu Vijayanagara continued, however, through the 16th century. In 1565, the Vijayanagara leader Aliya Rama Raya was captured and killed, and the city fell to a coalition of Deccan sultanates. The conquered capital city of Vijayanagara was looted and destroyed for 6 months, after which it remained in ruins.

== Location and history ==
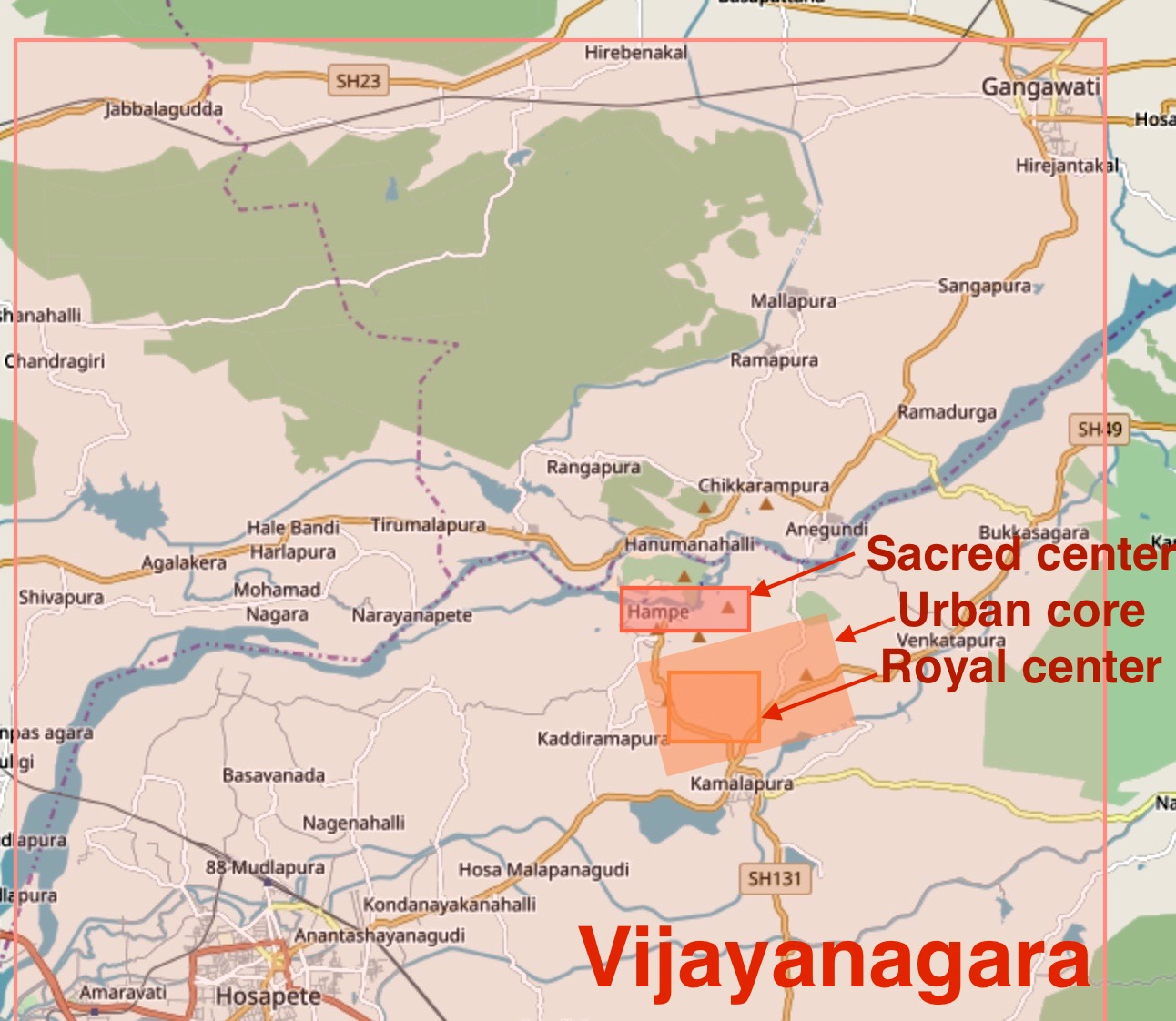
Hampi Vijayanagara in early 16th century. The sacred centre featured major Hindu temples and attached markets; the urban core included the royal centre; suburban satellites were spread from what is now Gangawati to Hosapete.

Vijayanagara is located in the modern era Indian state of Karnataka, along the banks of the Tungabhadra River. The city rapidly grew from being an ancient pilgrimage centre in the 13th century, to the capital of the Vijayanagara Empire in the early 14th century, and becoming a metropolis of approximately 650 square kilometres (250 sq mi) by the early 16th century. By 1500 CE, It became the world's second largest city, after Beijing. Memoirs by foreigners estimate the population was about 500,000, but others find this estimate to be either generous or too conservative.

The architecture of the capital, Vijayanagara, is purposely aligned with the natural features of the city from the time of Rama. Vijayanagara was founded around the religious Hindu temple complex, Pampa Tirtha, and Kishkindha that already existed at Hampi. The name of the city centre, Hampi, is derived from Pampa, another name of goddess Parvati in Hindu theology. According to Sthala Purana, Parvati (Pampa) pursued her ascetic lifestyle to win over and bring ascetic Shiva back into householder life on the banks of Tungabhadra river, on Hemakuta hill, now a part of Hampi. Shiva is also called Pampapati (lit. 'husband of Pampa'), and the river came to be known as Pampa river. The Sanskrit word Pampa morphed into the Kannada word Hampa, and the place Parvati pursued what she wanted came to be known as Hampe or Hampi. Its Hindu significance also comes from the Kishkindha chapters of the Hindu epic Ramayana, where Rama and Lakshmana meet Hanuman, Sugriva, and the monkey army in their search for kidnapped Sita. The Hampi area has many close resemblances to the place described in the epic. Traditionally understood to be the place described in the Ramayana, the region attracts many pilgrims.

Prior to its founding, Hindus and kings of various kingdoms visited Hampi. Hoysala Empire's Hindu kings built and supported the Hampi pilgrimage centre before the 14th century. At the start of the 14th century, the armies of Delhi Sultanate, first those of Alauddin Khalji and later of Muhammad bin Tughlaq invaded and pillaged South India. The Hoysala Empire and temple cities such as those in Halebidu, Belur and Somanathapura were plundered in early 14th century. From the ruins of this collapse and destruction emerged Vijayanagara Empire and its new capital Vijayanagara. The city was founded by Harihara I and Bukka, the Sangama brothers.

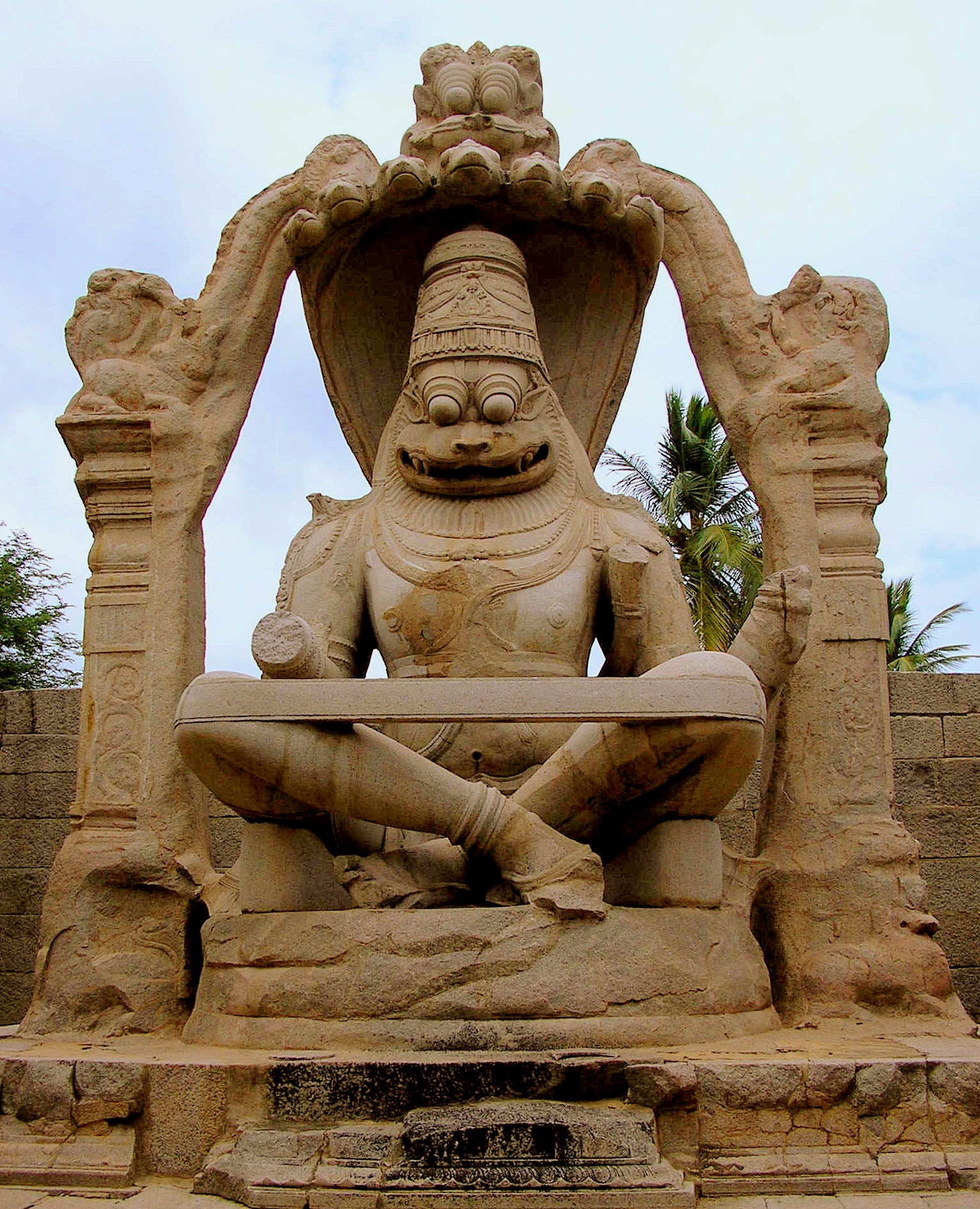
Statue of Ugranarasimha at Hampi

The city was already a sacred site of pilgrimage for devotees of Shiva in the 10th century. It became the most powerful urban centre in the Deccan between 14th to 16th centuries and one of the ten largest cities of the world. The Renaissance Portuguese and Persian traders reported it as a marvellous achievement.

The city was a powerful urban centre in South India from 14th to 16th century and one of the ten largest cities of the world. It stood as a bastion of Hindu values dedicated to fighting back the encroachments of the Muslim sultans from the north, who soon came to be operating from Golkonda. The Sangama dynasty was involved in repeated conflicts with the Bahamani Sultanate. The Bahamanis had later disintegrated into five sultanates which formed a Deccan alliance. Krishnadevaraya after the Battle of Raichur allowed one sultan to stay in power rather than let it split into smaller kingdoms. However, later Vijayanagara kings had to contend with multiple Sultanates to their north. The Vijayanagara kingdom befriended and allowed the Portuguese to take control of Goa and western territories of the Bahamani Sultanate. The sultanates united against the Vijayanagara Empire.

An ongoing war between Muslim Sultanates and the Hindu Vijayanagara Empire led to the Battle of Talikota in 1565 CE, fought about 175 kilometres (109 mi) north. It resulted in the capture and beheading of Vijayanagara leader Aliya Rama Raya, mass confusion within the Vijayanagara forces and a shock defeat. The Sultanate army then reached Vijayanagara, looted, destroyed and burnt it down to ruins over a period of several months. This is evidenced by the quantities of charcoal, the heat-cracked basements and burnt architectural pieces found by archaeologists in Vijayanagara region. The urban Vijayanagara was abandoned and remained in ruins ever since. Vijayanagara never recovered from the ruins.

The Italian Cesare Federici writing two years after the empire's defeat states that "The Citie of Bezeneger (Vijayanagara) is not altogether destroyed, yet the houses stand still, but empty, and there is dwelling in them nothing, as is reported, but Tygres and other wild beasts."

Archaeological evidence suggests that while the urban settlement was abandoned, a number of rural settlement in the metropolitan region were not fully emptied. Some population remained in the region (though there is no good assessment of how much), and a number of settlements founded in the Vijayanagara period remain occupied up to the present.

The ruins of the city were brought to light in the early 19th century by orientalist Colonel Colin Mackenzie.

== Description ==
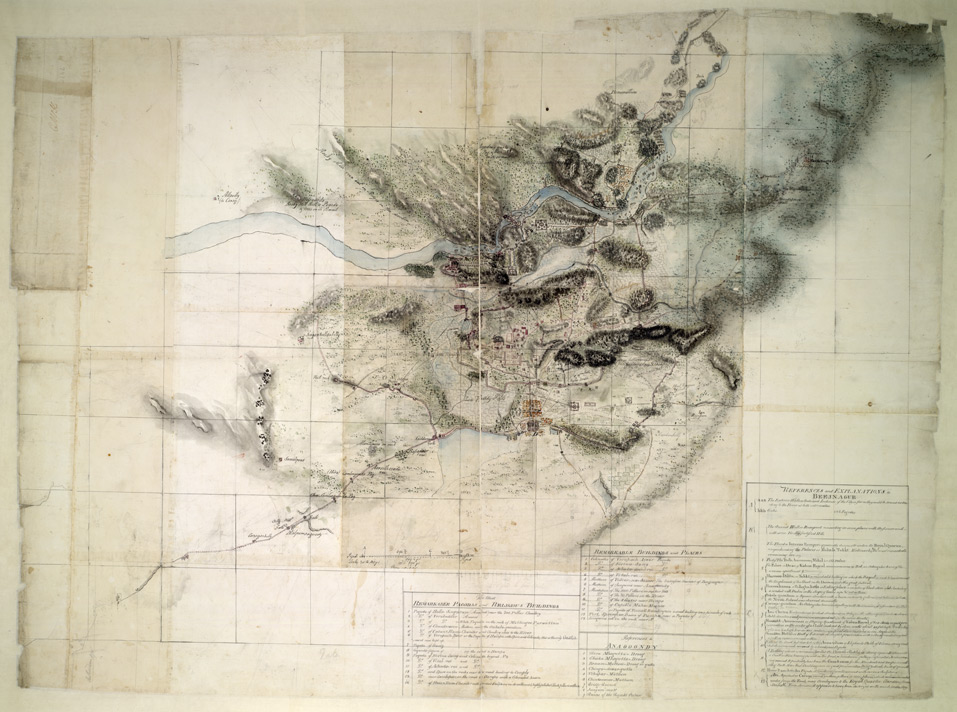
The earliest known map of Vijayanagara, based on drawings of 1785, published in 1820

Vijayanagara ruins in the 19th century
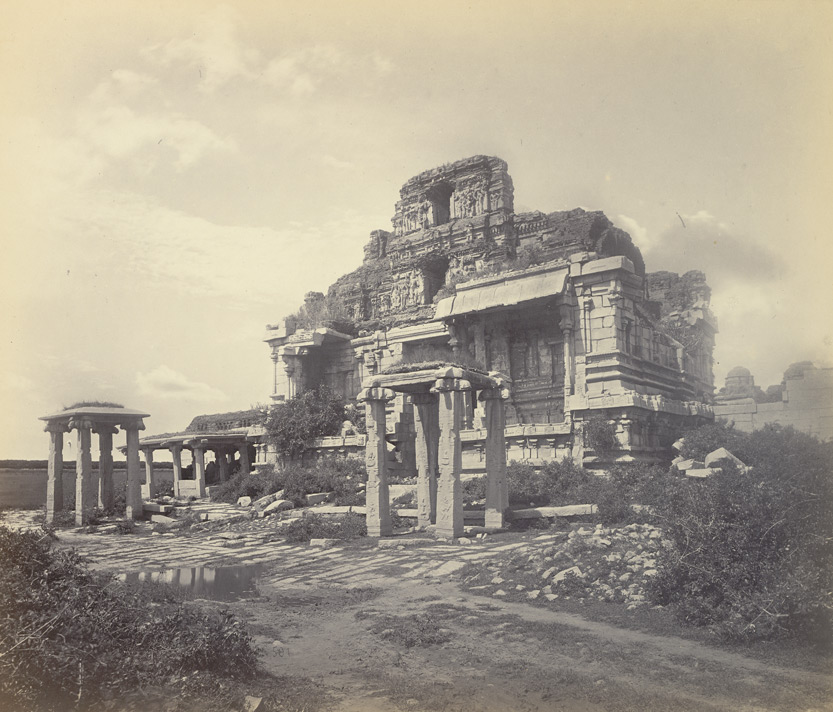
Krishna temple in 1868

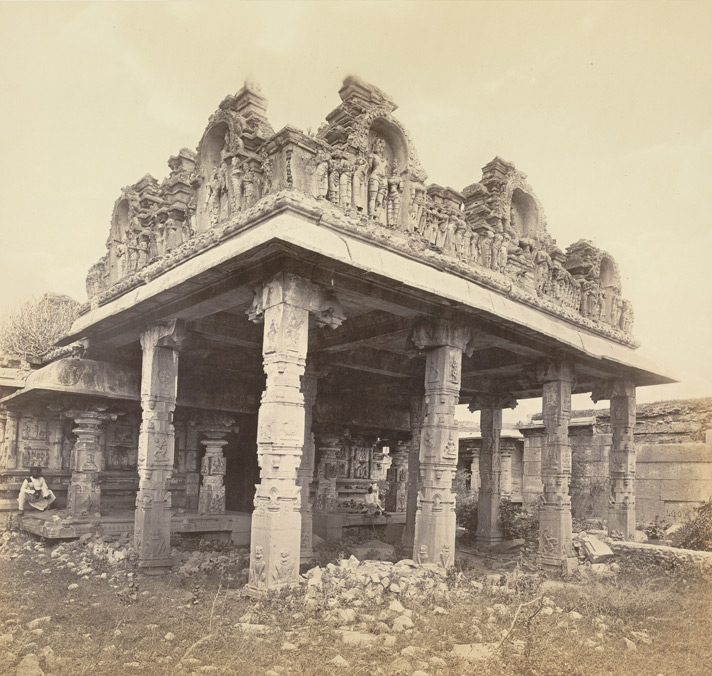
Rama temple in 1868

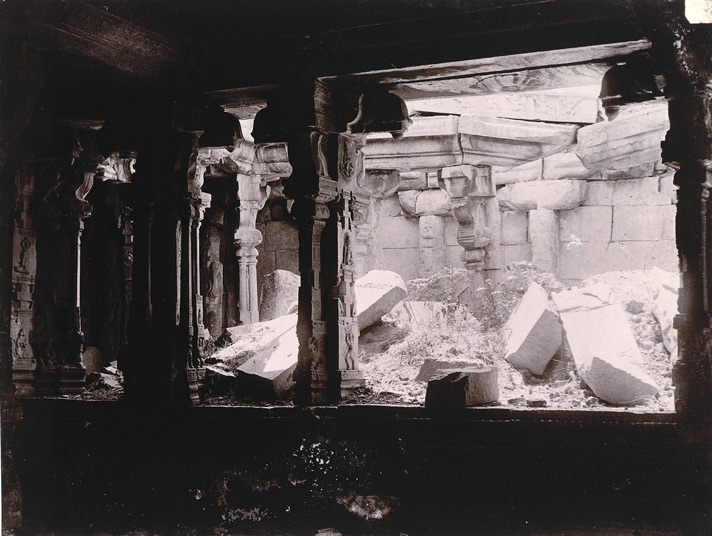
Vitthala temple in 1880

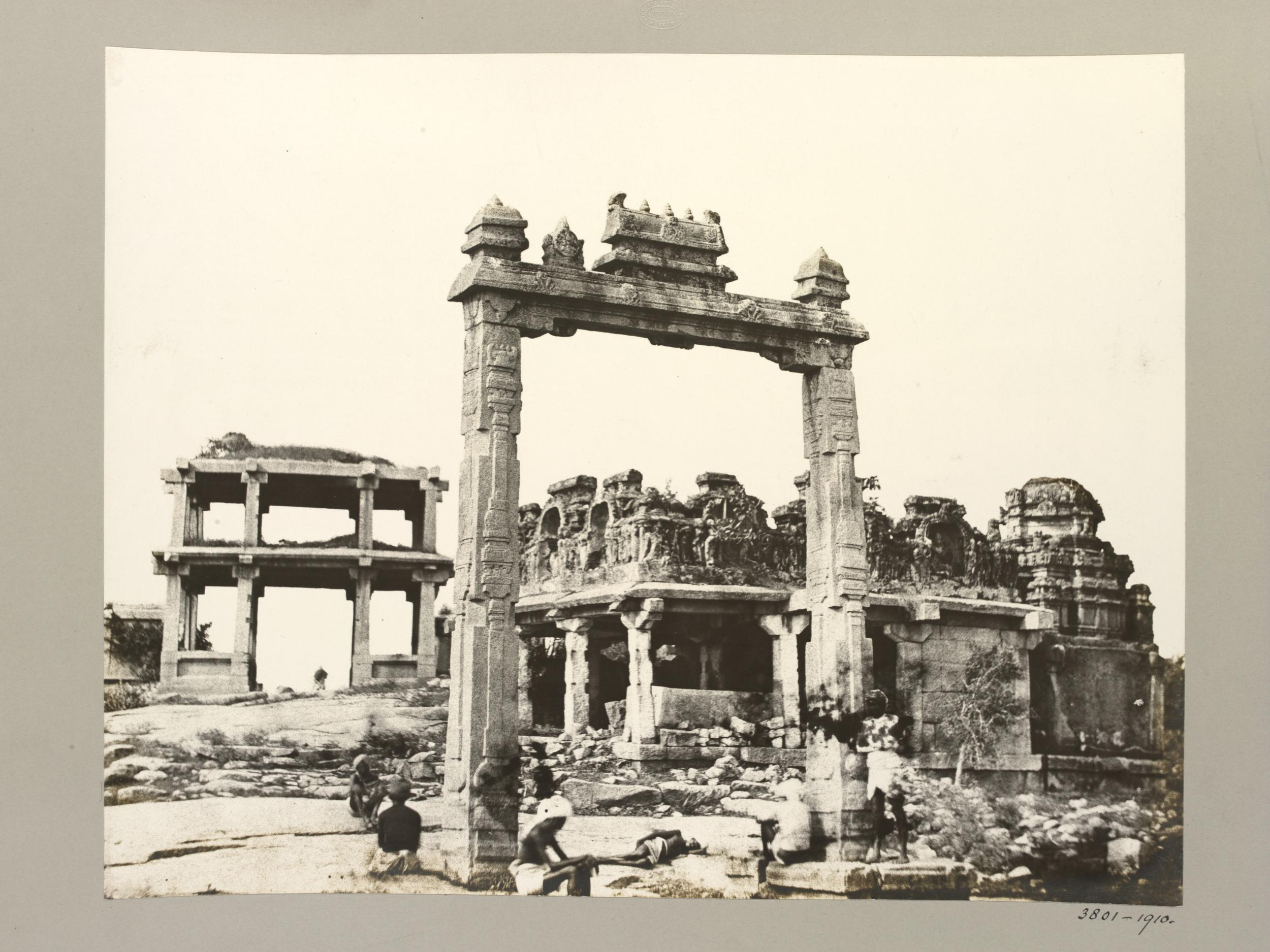
King's balance in 1858

The name translates as "City of Victory", from vijaya (victory) and nagara (city). As the prosperous capital of the largest and most powerful kingdom of its time in South India, Vijayanagara attracted people from all around the world.

After Timur's sack of Delhi, North India remained weak and divided. South India was better off, and the largest and most powerful of the southern kingdoms was Vijayanagar. This state and city attracted many of the Hindu refugees from the north. From contemporary accounts, it appears that the city was rich and very beautiful—The city is such that "eye has not seen nor ear heard of any place resembling it upon earth", says Abdur-Razzak from Central Asia. There were arcades and magnificent galleries for the bazaars, and rising above them all was the palace of the king surrounded by "many rivulets and streams flowing through channels of cut stone, polished and even." The whole city was full of gardens, and because of them, as an Italian visitor in 1420, Nicolo Conti writes, the circumference of the city was sixty miles. A later visitor was Paes, a Portuguese who came in 1522 after having visited the Italian cities of the Renaissance. The city of Vijayanagar, he says, is as "large as Rome and very beautiful to the sight"; it is full of charm and wonder with its innumerable lakes and waterways and fruit gardens. It is "the best-provided city in the world" and "everything abounds." The chambers of the palace were a mass of ivory, with roses and lotuses carved in ivory at the top--"it is so rich and beautiful that you would hardly find anywhere, another such.

— Jawaharlal Nehru, The Discovery of India

The ruined city is a World Heritage Site, known in that context as the Ruins of Hampi. In recent years there have been concerns regarding damage to the site at Hampi from heavy vehicular traffic and the construction of road bridges in the vicinity. Hampi was listed as a "threatened" World Heritage Site by the UNESCO but was later removed from the list after appropriate corrective measures were taken.

Traveller memoirs before 1565 CE record it as a large and developed metropolitan area. The Italian Cesari Federici writing two years after the Vijayanagara Empire's military defeat in 1565 describes the city after its ruin, "is not altogether destroyed, yet the houses stand still, but emptie [sic], and there is dwelling in them nothing, as is reported, but Tygres and other wild beasts."

Recent commentaries state:

The massive walls, which can still be traced, enclosed an area of more than sixty square miles, much of which was occupied by fields and gardens watered by canals from the river. The population cannot be estimated with precision, but it was certainly very large when judged by the standards of the fifteenth century. The great majority of the houses were naturally small and undistinguished, but among them were scattered palaces, temples, public buildings, wide streets of shops shaded by trees, busy markets, and all the equipment of a great and wealthy city. The principal buildings were constructed in the regular Hindu style, covered with ornamental carving, and the fragments which have survived suffice to give point to the enthusiastic admiration of the men who saw the city in the days of its magnificence.

Sanjay Subrahmanyam states that Vijayanagara was arguably one of the only three centres during this period with a population of over 100,000 in South India and that from the contemporary accounts and what remains of its expanse, the city proper and the suburbs had a population of 500,000 to 600,000. He notes that Domingo Paes had estimated its size at 100,000 houses.

== Area ==
Vijayanagara includes:

- Hampi, now UNESCO World Heritage Site.
- Anegundi, on the north side of the Tungabhadra River, in Koppal district.
- Kamalapura, a small temple town to the southeast of the Royal Centre, also houses an archaeological museum.
- Hospet, a city and railhead, to the southwest.
- Monuments spread Vijayanagara and nearby districts.

== See also ==
- Vijayanagara architecture
- List of colossal sculpture in situ
- List of largest monoliths in the world
- Sayana
- Allasani Peddana
- Medieval City of Vijayanagara
- Hampi
- Hampi (town)

== Notes ==
- Vijayanagara kaalada Sainyavyavasthe matthu Yuddhanithi, Dr.S.Y.Somashekhar, 2009, Sanchike Prakashana, Kannada University, Hampi, Vidyaranya, 583 276, Bellary Dist.
- Karnatakada Birudaavaligalu, Dr.S.Y.Somashekhar, 2014, Prasaranga, Kannada University, Hampi, Vidyaranya, 583 276, Bellary Dist.
- Sosale Srinivasachar & T.S. Satyan, Hampi: The fabled capital of the Vijayanagara Empire, (Directorate of Archaeology and Museums), Govt. of Karnataka, 1995
- J.M. Fritz et al., New Light on Hampi: Recent Research at Vijayanagara, (Performing Arts Mumbai, 2001) ISBN 81-85026-53-X
- A.H. Longhurst, Hampi Ruins Described and Illustrated, (Laurier Books Ltd., 1998) ISBN 81-206-0159-9
- The Ruins of Hampi:Travel Guide ISBN 81-7525-766-0
- Raghu Rai & Usha Rai, Vijayanagara Empire: Ruins to Resurrection, New Delhi, 2014. ISBN 978-93-83098-24-8
