= Ludovico di Varthema =

Italian explorer (c. 1470–1517)

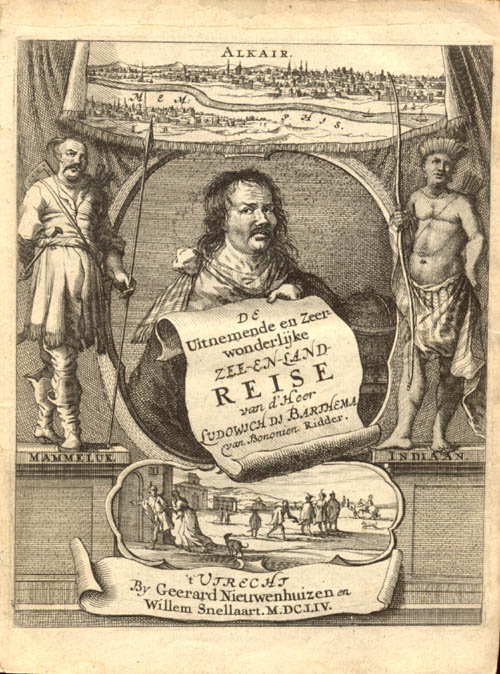
- Dutch title page of Varthema's book Itinerario, 1654
- Born: c. 1470; Bologna
- Died: 1517
- Occupations: Traveller; mamluk; writer
- Years active: 1502–1507
- Known for: Being one of the first Europeans to visit Mecca
- Notable work: Itinerario de Ludouico de Varthema

Ludovico di Varthema, also known as Barthema and Vertomannus (c. 1470 – 1517), was an Italian traveller, diarist and aristocrat known for being one of the first non-Muslim Europeans to enter Mecca as a pilgrim. Nearly everything that is known about his life comes from his own account of his travels, Itinerario de Ludouico de Varthema Bolognese, published in Rome in 1510.

== Biography ==
=== Middle East ===
Varthema was born in Bologna. He was perhaps a soldier before beginning his distant journeys, which he undertook apparently from a passion for adventure, novelty and the fame which (then especially) attended successful exploration.

Varthema left Europe near the end of 1502. Early in 1503, he reached Alexandria and ascended the Nile to Cairo. From Egypt, he sailed to Beirut and thence travelled to Tripoli, Aleppo and Damascus, where he managed to get himself enrolled, under the name of Yunus (Jonah), in the Mamluk garrison.

=== Mecca ===
From Damascus, Varthema made the journey to Mecca and Medina as one of the Mamluk escorts of a Hajj pilgrim caravan (April–June 1503). He describes the sacred cities of Islam and the chief pilgrim sites and ceremonies with remarkable accuracy, almost all his details being confirmed by later writers. Varthema was one of the first non-Muslim Europeans to visit these cities.

While in Mecca, Varthema was confronted by a Muslim overseas merchant, who accused him of being a Christian. The merchant explained to Varthema that nerves were on edge on account of the activities of the Portuguese, who had recently begun encroaching on the Indian Ocean and attacking Muslim shipping. (The massacre of the passengers of a Mecca pilgrim ship by Vasco da Gama in 1502 had been particularly shocking, although this event is not explicitly referred to by Varthema).

Hearing these stories, Varthema conceived of a ruse to get to India. Varthema presented himself as a master cannon founder, seeking to offer his services to the Muslim Sultan of Bijapur ("King of the Deccan"), to cast artillery to fight the Portuguese. Impressed by Varthema's resolution, the overseas Meccan merchant hid Varthema in his home, and the Mamluk escort returned to Syria without him.

=== Yemen ===
With the Meccan merchant's assistance, Ludovico de Varthema embarked an Arab merchant vessel at Jeddah, a city-port around 80 km west of Mecca, destined for India. It sailed down the Red Sea and through the Straits of Bab-el-Mandeb to Aden. However, upon reaching Aden, he was arrested and imprisoned as a Christian spy. He was accused of being a crew member of some Portuguese ships that had been preying on Arab shipping nearby (probably a reference to the squadron of Vicente Sodré, which was prowling the Gulf of Aden around this time.)

By his own account, Varthema gained his liberty after imprisonment both at Aden and Radaa because of a love affair with one of the sultanas of Yemen. The sultana kept him in her palace at Radaa for a while. Eventually, feigning a malady, Varthema secured the sultana's permission to leave Radaa to seek out a cure with a specialist in Aden. He subsequently took a tour through south-west Arabia (claiming to have visited Sanaa), before finally returning to Aden again. The actuality of his visit to Sanaa and the accuracy of his observations have been questioned on the basis of, among other things, his uncorroborated description of the Sultan's son being two dozen feet tall and inclined to bite people, kill them, and eat their flesh.

=== Persia ===
Probably using the sultana's cash gift, Varthema purchased passage on an Arab ship for India. By now it was March 1504. The ship was supposed to make a stop in the Persian Gulf first, but contrary winds forced it in the opposite direction, and it ended up having to sail south instead, calling in at Zeila and Berbera (on the coast of Somalia). He gives brief descriptions of both places.

From Somalia, the ship proceeded to sail across the Arabian Sea to the Indian port of Diu in Gujarat. From Diu, it sailed up the Gulf of Cambay to Gogo. Business done there, the ship sailed back across the Arabian Sea to the Persian Gulf. The ship made landfall at Julfar, on the other side of Cape Mussandam at the entrance to the gulf, then doubled back over the cape to make a brief stop in Muscat, before proceeding across the strait to Hormuz.

Arriving in Hormuz in the aftermath of a palace coup, Varthema did not linger for long, but proceeded to cross to mainland Persia. He seems to have traveled northeast across Persia to Herat (twelve days’ journey from Hormuz), and then returned southwest to Shiraz (twenty-three days). Along the way, he passed a river which he (erroneously) identifies as the Euphrates (it is probably the Pulvar River). Varthema describes the Persians as, "the most cunning men in intellect and at falsifying things of any nation in the world," but also as "the best companions and the most liberal of any men who inhabit the earth."

In Shiraz, Varthema came by chance across a Persian merchant whom he had met earlier in Mecca. The Persian merchant, named "Cazazioner" in the chronicle (probably an Italianization of "Khwaja Junair" in original Persian), entered into a partnership with Varthema, whom he still called Yunus and believed was a fellow Muslim. The two would remain together for the remainder of Varthema's travels in Asia. It seems clear that Varthema was the junior partner in the arrangement, and that Cazazioner was also cultivating him as a future son-in-law. The subsequent itinerary was primarily set by Cazazioner's commercial interests, with Varthema accompanying him through his routine trade stops.

Ludovico de Varthema and his new Persian partner joined an overland caravan to Samarkand, but the expedition was called off partway upon news of disturbances in the area. Varthema refers to the Shi'ite Safavid rising, which had spread into northern Iran around this time. The caravan returned to Shiraz.

=== India ===
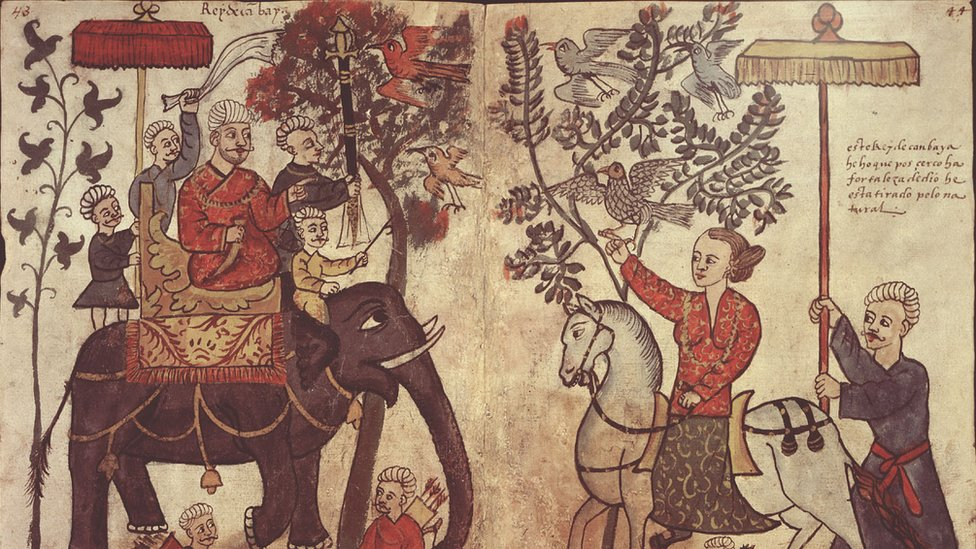
The king of Cambay (in present-day Gujarat) from "Figurae variae Asiae et Africae", a 16th-century Portuguese manuscript in the Casanatense Library in Rome (Codex Casanatense 1889).

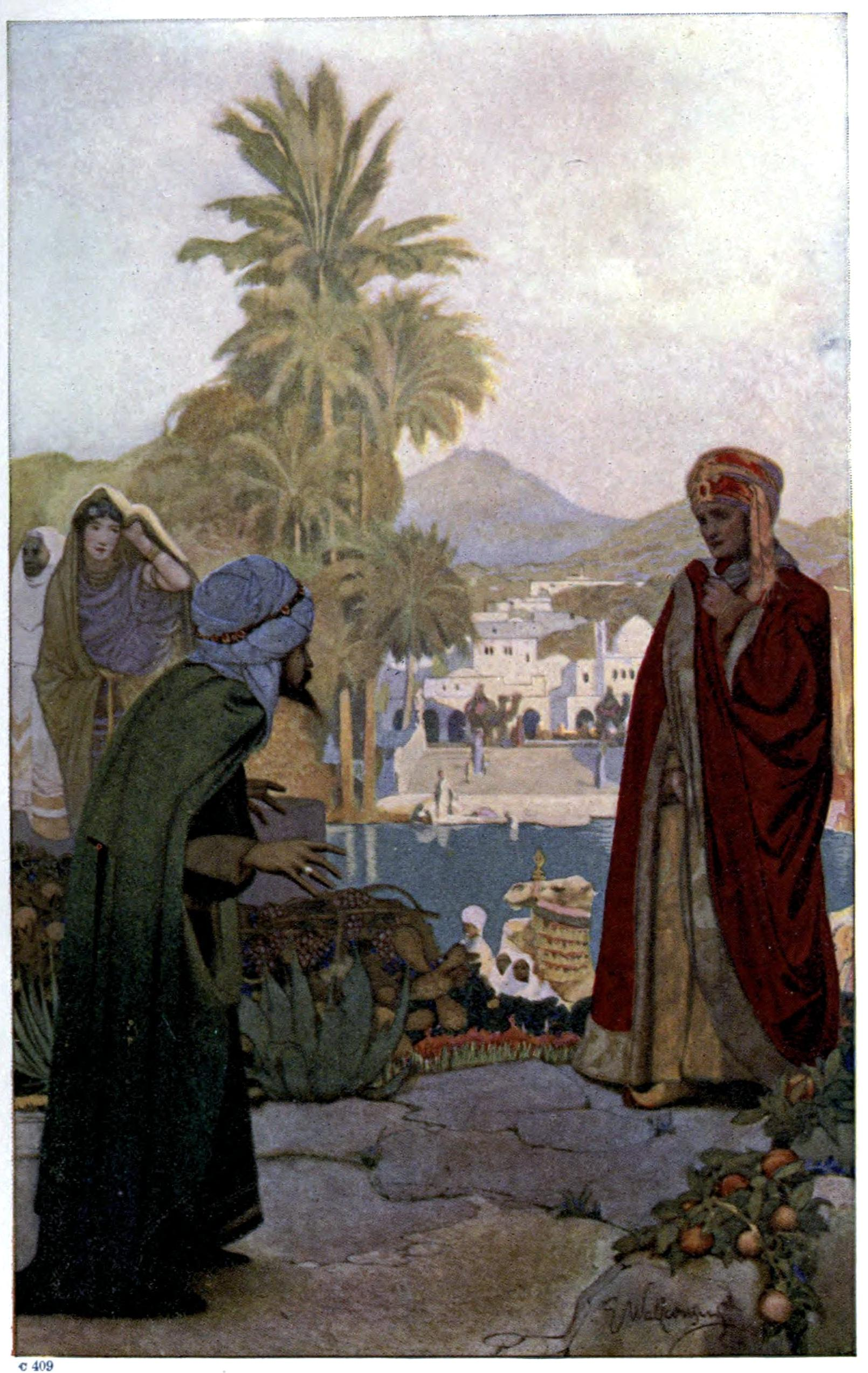
The meeting near Shiraz of Vathema and Khoa Zianor

With the overland route closed by war, Ludovico de Varthema and his Persian partner proceeded from Shiraz down to Ormuz, where they took ship for India. They made call at the mouth of the Indus River. From there, Varthema and his Persian partner sailed down the west coast of India. This cruise began around October 1504.

Their first stop was the bustling port of Cambay, in modern Gujarat. Varthema gives a vivid description of the Sultan of Cambay and a garbled description of Jains and Yogi ascetics. They then proceeded south, making stops at Chaul and Dabul, before reaching Goa. From Goa, Varthema and his partner made a seven-day excursion inland to Bijapur, capital of the Deccan sultanate of Adil Khan. Returning to the coast and boarding ship again, they continued south, making stops at Ankala, Honavar, Bhatkal and Mangalore, most of them tributary ports of the inland Hindu kingdom of Vijaynagara (confusingly, in the sequence of his account, Varthema places Bhatkal before Ankola; it is probable he confused Karwar with Bhatkal).

They then reach Cannanore, the first of the major Malabari city-states in Kerala, notionally subject to the Zamorin. At Cannanore, Varthema may have seen the first Portuguese, who had a factory in the city, but apparently refrained from interacting with them, perhaps out of fear of being revealed. From Cannanore, Varthema and his partner took an overland journey of fifteen days to the interior city of Vijayanagara, capital of the eponymous Hindu empire. He briefly interrupts his travelogue at this point to describe war elephants and coinage of south India. It is probably around December 1504 now.

Returning to the coast, Varthema and his partner boarded ship again and proceeded down the Malabar Coast, making stops at the small ports of Dharmapattanam, Pandarane (Pantalayani, now Koyilandy) and Kappad (Capogatto) before finally reaching the great city of Calicut, seat of the Zamorin and the major spice emporium on the Malabar Coast. However, a naval trade blockade imposed on Calicut by the Portuguese had thinned the local markets, disappointing the business Varthema and his Persian partner had expected to conduct there. If the dating is correct (early January, 1505), Kerala was still smoldering in the aftermath of the hard-fought Battle of Cochin, and the most recent Portuguese armada was still in the vicinity.

At this point, Varthema breaks the narrative to describe Calicut in much detail. He gives an account of the Zamorin's court, government, the administration of justice and military. He describes the topography, economy, trade and navigation of the city, and gives an overview of the manners and customs of Malabari society. This chapter contains one of the earliest European descriptions of Hindu religion and the caste system. Nowhere do Varthema's observing power show themselves more strikingly, if still somewhat quaint and mistaken in some details.

Varthema and his Persian partner resumed their trip southwards via the inner lagoons and rivers of the Kerala backwaters rather than by the sea coast, possibly to elude Portuguese naval patrols. They skipped past Cochin, where the Portuguese had their strongest presence at the time, and sailed via the backwaters far as "Cacolon" (probably Kayamkulam). It is here where Varthema first encountered Saint Thomas Christians. Continuing on, they soon reached the major commercial city of Quilon, but as the ruler was a Portuguese ally, they did not linger there, but continued on quickly, now sailing by the coast again.

The ship carrying Varthema and his Persian partner rounded Cape Comorin (southern tip of India) and followed the coast northeast. They made a stop at the small port of "Chayl" (exact location uncertain but assumed to be one of the pearl fishery ports in the environs of Tuticorin). They proceeded on to a large port city that Varthema calls "Cioromandel", which seems to correspond to Negapatam, a vassal city of Vijayanagara on the Coromandel Coast of India.

=== Ceylon, Bengal, Burma ===
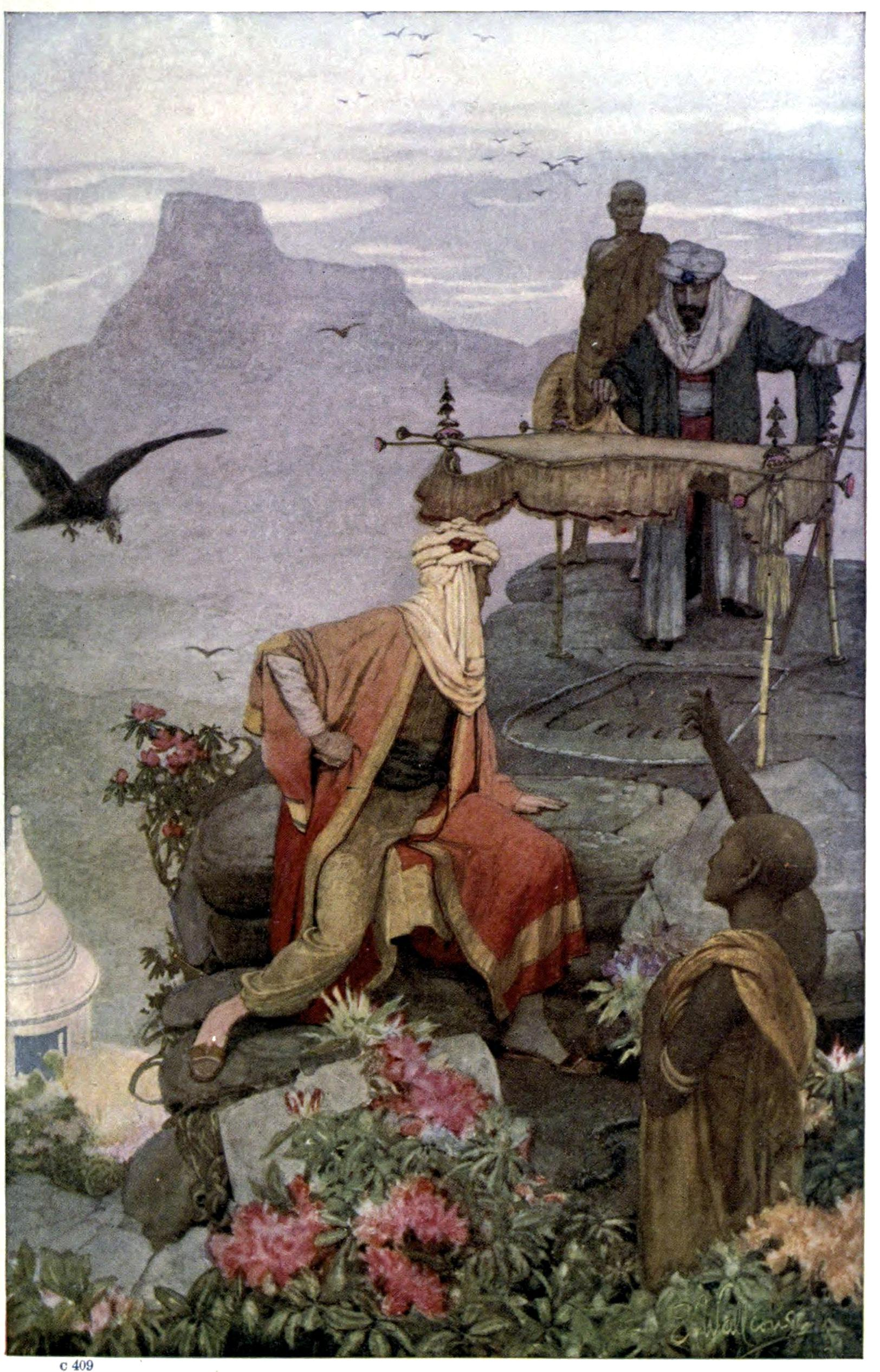
Varthema visits the foot prints of Buddha on Adam's peak, Ceylon

Varthema and his Persian partner stopped advancing further up the coast, as there were reports of war breaking out in the area. Instead, they took a ship with some other merchants across the Palk Strait to the island of Ceylon. His exact landing is unclear. His description is consistent with Colombo (in the westerly Kingdom of Kotte), but the speed of his journey makes it likelier to be northerly Jaffna. He gives a brief description of the island, the rivalry of its four kingdoms, and its cinnamon plantations. Their stay here was cut short after Cazazioner got entangled in the intrigues of a local Arab merchant. They set sail back to India, arriving three days later at Pulicat, another Vijayanagara subject city on the Coromandel coast.

From Pulicat, Varthema and his Persian partner sailed straight east across the Bay of Bengal and, after fourteen days (c. March 1505), reached Tenasserim (on the upper Malay peninsula, now part of Burma, but then part of the Ayutthaya Kingdom of Thailand). Varthema pauses the narrative to give a description of Tenasserim, its military, administration, economy, and society. He refers to distinctly-dressed groups of "Brahmins" in the city (probably a reference to Buddhist monks, Varthema not quite realizing the distinction between them). It is also here that Varthema first witnesses and describes the funerary ritual of Sati. In one eyebrow-raising episode, Varthema reports that a local merchant invited them to sleep with his new wife, explaining it was the "custom" of the land to invite strangers to deflower virgin brides. Cazazioner dutifully took up the request.

After a few weeks in Tennasserim, Varthema and his Persian partner proceeded to sail northwest to Bengal. After eleven days sailing, they arrived at a port that Varthema called "Benghalla", at the mouth of the Ganges River. The identification of the port of "Benghalla" on the Ganges delta is unclear. It has been alternatively suggested it refer to Satgaon, Chittagong, perhaps more likely, Sonargaon.

In Bengal, Varthema met a pair of Chinese Christian merchants. This passage has provoked various conjectures by historians since. According to Varthema, the pair were from the "city of Sarnau", and that there were "many other Christian lords" like them there, all of them "subjects of the Great Khan of Cathay". The location of Sarnau is unclear. The name does not show up on contemporary maps, but appears in a few other travelogues of the time. Some (e.g. Fra Oderico) claim Sarnau is in northern China, but others (e.g. Giovanni da Empoli, Fernão Mendes Pinto) suggest it is located in Indochina. The most frequent suggestion is that Sarnau is the Thai capital city of Ayutthaya. The term "Sarnau" may just be a transcription of the Persian term "Shar-i Nau", meaning "New City", the name by which Ayutthaya was also known at the time. There is no contradiction in their statement about Cathay: the Ayutthaya kingdom, like most other kingdoms of Indochina, had been notionally tributary to the Chinese emperor. Their identification as "Christian" and "many other Christian lords" may seem puzzling as Christianity was not known to have reached Thailand at this time. However, Nestorian Christian communities had spread in Central Asia and China with the Mongol Empire, and the persecutions after the fall of the Yuan dynasty in 1368 may have prompted an exodus of Nestorian Christian refugees to Indochina. Later in the travelogue, Varthema notes the ruler of Pegu (Burma) had an entire regiment of such Christians. However, Varthema claims they are "as white as us" and "write in a contrary way to us, in the manner of the Armenians". Setting aside the latter error (Armenian is written from left to right, like Latin script), Varthema may have meant Syriac script, implying these were most likely ethnically Central Asian or Persian Nestorian Christians, who moved to China during the Yuan dynasty, and later found their way to Indochina. However, it does not rule out that they may simply have been Chinese or Thai converts - Varthema uses the term "white" repeatedly to describe Southeast Asians (in contrast to South Asians).

The two Chinese Christians persuaded Varthema and his partner Cazazioner to accompany them. They all took a ship together from Bengal across the bay to Pegu (lower Burma). Hearing that the best potential customer for their wares, the King of Pegu, was on campaign against the Ava Kingdom (upper Burma), the party set off on a boat up the Irrawaddy River, but soon gave up, and returned to Pegu to await him there. The king arrived a few days later, and granted them an audience. With the two Chinese Christians as translators, Cazizioner and Varthema, exercising their best negotiating skills, sold the monarch some relatively modest red coral in exchange for a fortune in high-value Burmese rubies (in an earlier passage, Varthema identifies the source of rubies to be "Capellan", a common name for the ruby-mining district of upper Burma.)

=== Malacca, Sumatra, Moluccas ===
From Pegu, Varthema, his Persian partner and the two Chinese Christians took a ship down the Malay peninsula to Malacca, the major commercial entrepot of the region. They did not, however, stay in Malacca long, and soon crossed over the strait to Sumatra. They called in at the port city of Pedir (then a major commercial center and capital of a northeast Sumatran sultanate, Pedir was subsequently annexed by the Aceh Sultanate and has since declined into insignificance) Varthema describes the abundance of long pepper and variety of perfumed woods that was available at Pedir.

At this point, the two Chinese Christians expressed a desire to return home to Sarnau, and hearing that Varthema had been born a Christian, sought to persuade him to come with them and resume his old faith. But Varthema declined, saying he wished to remain a Muslim convert. His Persian partner, Cazizioner, expressed his wish to visit the famed Spice Islands and see for himself the source of cloves and nutmeg, the glorious spices, and prevailed on the two Chinese Christians to join them. A pair of local sampans (flat-bottomed boats) were procured and they proceeded to sail east, weaving through the Indonesian islands, and after fifteen days, reached the Banda Islands, the world's only source of nutmeg. From there, they sailed north for another twelve days and reached the clove islands of the Moluccas (which Varthema calls "Monoch").

=== Return voyage: Borneo, Java ===
The Moluccas was the furthest eastward point reached by Varthema and his Persian partner. It was by now around June 1505. Guided by the two Chinese Christians, they returned via a different route, first proceeding to Borneo to charter a larger ship, then headed south to Java, the "largest island in the world", according to the Chinese Christians (Java is, in fact, smaller than Borneo).

Varthema observed that the native pilot of their vessel used a magnetic compass and nautical chart gridded with lines. Although sailing by compass and chart was common in the Mediterranean, it was unusual in the Indian Ocean, where celestial navigation was the norm, and perplexed Varthema's Persian partner. The native pilot also showed them how he used the Southern Cross to navigate, another novelty for both of them. In a cryptic comment, the native pilot curiously refers to some supposed Far Southern lands (which some historians have interpreted to be a reference to the Australian coast).

The journey from Borneo to Java took five days. It is unclear where in Java they landed. Varthema makes some quick observations about the island (notably, the prevalence of Hinduism, unlike the Islam they consistently encountered in other ports). In a dubious passage, Varthema claims that a substantial part of the Javanese population engaged in cannibalism. Staying in Java for a couple of weeks, they decided it was time to resume their return journey. Before leaving, Varthema purchased some emeralds as well as buying two castrated young children.

Chartering a junk (giunco) from Java, they made their way back to Malacca, where Varthema and Cazizioner finally parted company with the two Chinese Christians. On the same Javanese junk, they proceeded west across the Bay of Bengal, fifteen days sailing, to the Coromandel Coast of India, and disembarked at Negapatam. After a few weeks, they took a sampan to Quilon. The presence of some Portuguese in Quilon frightened Varthema, and he kept a low profile until he found passage, again via the Kerala backwaters, back to Calicut.

=== Calicut ===
In Calicut, Ludovico de Varthema came across two Italians — Varthema gives their names as Pier'Antonio and Gian'Maria, and identifies them as Milanese (Portuguese sources identify them as Venetian agents). They were military engineers that the Zamorin had hired to cast European-style artillery to fight the Portuguese. Temporarily separated from his Persian partner, and overcome by homesickness, Varthema revealed himself to them as a Christian and a compatriot. The two Italians, who had arrived in India in 1502, expressed their desire to return home, but that the Zamorin would not let them go. Learning that the next Portuguese armada was due to arrive in India soon (estimated September 1505), Varthema made up his mind to meet with the Portuguese captains and secure them all passage back to Europe. However, the two Italians doubted the Portuguese would pardon them.

While staying in Calicut, Varthema continued to meet with his new Italian friends. To allay the suspicions of his Persian partner, Varthema conjured up a ruse, professing a spiritual awakening had convinced him to embrace a more stringent religious life. For the next few weeks, Varthema lived as a Muslim ascetic in a Calicut mosque (albeit stealing away at night to join the Italians for dinner). His portrayal as a holy man was sufficiently convincing that he was even sought out as a healer.

At length, news reached Calicut that the Portuguese armada had finally arrived in Cannanore. It was by now late October or early November 1505 (Varthema mistakenly reports early September). Varthema arranged to leave for Cannanore with some Persian merchants. Their ship, however, was stopped in the harbor by the Calicut authorities and prevented from leaving. But the party eventually managed to sneak aboard a smaller vessel and finally made their way there. Cazizioner did not accompany them, but gave Varthema a letter of introduction to a merchant friend in Cannanore. Varthema would not see his old Persian partner again.

=== Defection to the Portuguese ===
After a few days, Ludovico de Varthema slipped away from his Persian hosts in Cannanore, and presented himself to the Portuguese authorities, revealing himself a Christian. Varthema was taken to Fort Sant' Angelo of Cannanore, and for the next three days, was personally interviewed by the Portuguese naval captain D. Lourenço de Almeida. Varthema supplied Almeida with the particulars of the Zamorin's military and naval preparations, as he had observed during his stay in Calicut. Almeida dispatched Varthema, and his report, on a ship to Cochin, to his father, D. Francisco de Almeida, the Portuguese vice-roy in India. Delighted by the intelligence provided, Almeida received Varthema warmly. At Varthema's request, Almeida consented to give the two Italian engineers in Calicut a safe-conduct, and sent Varthema back to Cannanore, along with instructions for his son Lourenço to give him all necessary assistance. Varthema tapped into the local spy network to communicate with the Italians in Calicut. But it ended in failure. The plan to spring them out of Calicut was overheard by a slave and revealed. Before the Zamorin's authorities could arrest them, an enraged mob descended, seized and killed the two Italians. Varthema received the news in Cannanore in March 1506.

Later that same month (March 1506), Varthema witnessed the naval Battle of Cannanore between Zamorin's fleet and the Portuguese fleet of Lourenço de Almeida, which he describes in some detail. Shortly after, Varthema was hired by the Portuguese factory in Cannanore to help the Portuguese authorities enforce their strict new shipping restrictions on the Malabar Coast (the cartaz system). Varthema used his Arabic language skills to interrogate local captains of merchant vessels traveling with suspect licenses.

Ludovico de Varthema remained in this position for around a year and a half. He was huddled among the defenders during the desperate Siege of Cannanore, that lasted from April to August 1507, when they were finally rescued by the arriving armada of D. Tristão da Cunha. He claims that after the battle, some of his old acquaintances became Christian converts. Varthema subsequently joined a punitive Portuguese raid led by Cunha on the Calicut-allied port of Ponnani in November. For his exploits there, Ludovico de Varthema was knighted by the viceroy Francisco de Almeida in Cochin, with Tristão da Cunha standing as his sponsor.

=== Return to Europe ===
Ludovico de Varthema left India on 6 December 1507, departing from Cannanore, aboard the Portuguese return armada. He sailed aboard the São Vicente, a ship owned by Bartolomeo Marchionni, a Florentine merchant in Lisbon. They followed the usual return route, crossing the Indian Ocean, and then sailing down the East African coast. Their first, and apparently only stop, was Mozambique Island. Although Varthema refers to various other points along the Swahili Coast (e.g. Malindi, Mombassa, Kilwa) it does not seem (and it would not have been likely) that he saw them personally, but was merely reporting them second-hand from the Portuguese. Varthema may however have seen Pemba and the Comoros from the distance.

Varthema gives a brief description of Mozambique Island, including the native Bantu inhabitants on the mainland. He mentions the new Portuguese fortress which was under construction on the island (Fort São Gabriel, begun by captain Vasco Gomes de Abreu in late 1507). Varthema refers to Francisco de Almeida's raids of 1505 and Tristão da Cunha's jaunt to Madagascar over the winter of 1506–07 and in a personal aside, expresses hope that all of Asia will eventually become Christian.

After a brief period of recovery, the journey was resumed. The fleet sailed down the Mozambique Channel and then rounded the Cape of Good Hope from the east. They were hit shortly after by a storm which dispersed the fleet, and the São Vicente sailed on alone. Varthema reports they passed near the islands of Saint Helena and Ascension in the south Atlantic. After crossing the equator, they alighted in the Azores islands, where they stopped for a couple of days for refreshment. They reached Lisbon about a week later.

Shortly after arriving, Ludovico de Varthema sought out an audience with the Portuguese king Manuel I in Almada, to confirm the patent of knighthood he received in India. That done, Ludovico de Varthema proceeded back to Rome, Italy. He gives no further details, his travelogue ending here.

== Work and legacy ==
As Richard Francis Burton said in his book The Pilgrimage to Al-Medinah and Meccah:

For correctness of observation and readiness of wit Varthema stands in the foremost rank of the old Oriental travellers. In Arabia and in the Indian archipelago east of Java he is (for Europe and Christendom) a real discoverer. Even where passing over ground traversed by earlier European explorers, his keen intelligence frequently adds valuable original notes on peoples, manners, customs, laws, religions, products, trade, methods of war.

In his discourse on Varthema, Sir Richard Carnac Temple writes:

...he escapes by gross deception from a companion who had more than befriended him for about a year and a half with only words of abuse. He does not show himself as a man of any real kindness of character.

Varthema's work "Itinerario de Ludouico de Varthema Bolognese" was first published in Italian at Rome in 1510. Other Italian editions appeared at Rome, 1517, at Venice, 1518, 1535, 1563, 1589, etc., at Milan, 1519, 1523, 1525. Latin translations appeared at Milan, 1511 (by Archangelus Madrignanus); and at Nuremberg, 1610. The book has been translated into 50 languages.

== See also ==
- Johann Schiltberger (1380 – c. 1440), late medieval traveller and writer
- John Mandeville, putative author of the 14th-century book, The Travels of Sir John Mandeville

== Bibliography ==
- Itinerary of Ludovico Di Varthema of Bologna from 1502 to 1508. By Lodovico de Varthema, John Winter Jones, Richard Carnac Temple. Contributor Lodovico de Varthema, John Winter Jones, Richard Carnac Temple. Published by Asian Educational Services, 1997. ISBN 81-206-1269-8, ISBN 978-81-206-1269-3. 121 pages.
- The Travels of Ludovico di Varthema in Egypt, Syria, Arabia Deserta and Arabia Felix, in Persia, India, and Ethiopia, A.D. 1503 to 1508. By Lodovico de Varthema; Edited by George Percy Badger; Translated by John Winter Jones. Originally published by the Hakluyt Society, London in 1863. Reprint by Adamant Media Corporation, 2001. ISBN 1-4021-9553-2, ISBN 978-1-4021-9553-2. 320 pages.
- Ludouici Patritii Romani Nouum itinerarium Aethiopiae, Aegipti, vtriusque Arabiae, Persidis, Siriae, ac Indiae, intra et extra Gangem .
- Jafari Mazhab, Mohsen: "Iran in Itinerary of Ludovico Di Varthema" (Iran dar Safarnameye Lodovico Vartema) (in Farsi) Ketab-e Mah-e Tarikh va Joghrafia, Tehran no.37–38, Nov.–Dec. 1998
- Howgego, Raymond John, ed. (2003). "Varthema, Lodovico di". Encyclopedia of Exploration to 1800. Hordern House. pp. 1057–1058. ISBN 1875567364.
