= Ankala =

- Village
- Location in Gujarat, India Ankala (India)
- Country: India
- State: Gujarat
- District: Sabarkantha

Government
  - Type: indian

Languages
  - Official: Gujarati, Hindi
- Time zone: UTC+5:30 (IST)

Ankala is a village in Idar Taluka of the Sabarkantha district of Gujarat, India. It is near Idar and Himatnagar.
