= Domingo Paes =

Portuguese traveller in Vijayanagara Empire, India

Domingo Paes (sometimes spelt Pais) was a traveller from Portuguese India, who visited the Vijayanagara Empire, located on the southern portion of the Deccan Plateau in around 1520. He journeyed together with a group of traders from what was then Portuguese Goa, which was the capital of other territories such as Portuguese Bombay. His visit took place during the reign of the Emperor Krishnadevaraya, Paes recorded his impressions of Vijayanagara in his work Chronica dos reis de Bisnaga (Indo-Portuguese for "Chronicle of the kings of Vijayanagar"). His detailed account is one of the few known descriptions of that empire and of its capital, Vijayanagara (Hampi), by a chronicler from abroad.

Paes reported, "The kingdom has many places on the coast of India, which are seaports with whom we are at peace, and some of them have factories, in particular at Amcola (Ankola), Mirgeo (Mirjan), Honor, Batecalla, Mamgalor, Bracalor and Bacanor." Paes also records that advanced irrigation technology allowed the kingdom to produce high yields of crops at very reasonable prices. He also describes a busy market of precious stones, and that the city was prospering. Its size in the eyes of the narrator, was comparable to Rome, with abundant vegetation, aqueducts and artificial lakes.
