= Shukla =

Shukla (Sanskrit: शुक्ल) is a word of Sanskrit origin that means "bright" or "white". A variant of the name is Shkula.

Notable people with the name include:

- Abhay Shukla, Indian TV actor known for his role as Inspector Nikhil in TV series CID
- Abhinav Shukla (producer), Indian film and TV producer
- Abhinav Shukla, Indian actor
- Abhishek Shukla (Indian Geriatrician and Palliative Care Physician)
- Ajai Shukla, Indian army officer, journalist and defense analyst
- Amarjeet Shukla, Indian actor
- Anand Shukla, Indian cricketer who played first-class cricket from 1960 to 1978
- Anand Swaroop Shukla, Indian politician and a member of 17th Legislative Assembly of Uttar Pradesh state of India
- Anjuli Shukla, Indian film director and cinematographer, first and till date the only Indian woman to win the National Film Award for Best Cinematography
- Amitabh Shukla, Indian film editor, most known for his work in Chak De! India, Krrish, Holiday and Chalte Chalte
- Amitesh Shukla, INC Politician, member Chhattisgarh Legislative Assembly and former Minister of Rural Development in the Government of Chhattisgarh
- Aseem Shukla, Director of Minimally Invasive Surgery in the Department of Urology at the Children's Hospital of Philadelphia, PA
- Ashish Shukla, Indian author on geopolitics and terrorism, former editor of Cricket Samrat
- Ashthabhuja Prasad Shukla, Indian politician, member of the 10th Lok Sabha (Lower House) of the Indian Parliament
- Avay Shukla, Indian Administrative Service officer, environmentalist and writer
- Baikuntha Shukla, Indian nationalist and revolutionary
- Balkrishna Khanderao Shukla, Indian politician and Member of Parliament of the 15th Lok Sabha (Lower House) of the Indian Parliament from Vadodara
- Balram Shukla, Indian poet and academic
- Bhagwati Prasad Shukla, Indian politician and member of the Bharatiya Janata Party from Lucknow, Uttar Pradesh
- Chakrapani Shukla, Member of Parliament, India
- Champa Devi Shukla, activist from Bhopal, India and recipient of the Goldman Environmental Prize, 2004
- Chandra Prakash Shukla, Indian politician and a member of 17th Legislative Assembly of Uttar Pradesh state of India
- Chitra Shukla, Indian actress who works in Telugu-Kannada language films
- Daisy Irani (actress) (Daisy Irani Shukla), Indian actress in Hindi and Telugu language films
- Deepak Shukla, American molecular virologist with expertise in herpesviruses
- Haimanti Sukla, Bengali singer
- Jagadish Shukla, Indian meteorologist, professor at George Mason University, Virginia
- Jang Bahadur Shukla, Indian mathematician
- Jhanak Shukla, Indian actress
- Jyoti Kiran (Jyoti Kiran Shukla), Indian politician, activist, educationist, strategist and Chair of Rajasthan's 5th State Finance Commission
- Kamlesh Shukla, Indian politician from the BJP and a member of 17th Legislative Assembly of Uttar Pradesh of India
- Karuna Shukla, member of the 14th Lok Sabha of India, representing Janjgir constituency of Chhattisgarh
- Krishna Kant Shukla, Indian physicist, musician, poet, ecologist and educator
- Laxmi Ratan Shukla, Indian cricketer and politician
- Mahendra Shukla, Indian first-class cricketer
- Manoj Muntashir, Indian lyricist, poet and screenwriter
- Mukesh Shukla, or Mukesh, businessman and politician in Uganda
- Munna Shukla, Kathak guru and choreographer of Lucknow Gharana
- Narayan Shukla (also known as SN Shukla), judge of the Allahabad High Court
- Nikesh Shukla, British author and screenwriter
- Padma Kant Shukla (1950–2015), Indian physicist, university professor in several countries
- Pratibha Shukla, Indian politician and member of the Uttar Pradesh Legislative Assembly from Akbarpur-Raniya constituency
- Pravina Shukla, professor of folklore at Indiana University Bloomington
- Rahul Shukla, Indian first-class cricketer from Jaunpur district who plays for Jharkhand in domestic cricket
- Raj Shukla, Lieutenant General, YSM, SM, currently serving as General Officer Commanding-in-Chief (GOC-in-C) Army Training Command (ARTRAC)
- Raj Kumar Shukla, Indian freedom fighter, who convinced Mahatma Gandhi to visit Champaran for the Champaran Satyagraha
- Rajeev Shukla, Indian politician, journalist, political commentator and the former chairman of Indian Premier League. Presently, VP of BCCI
- Rajendra Shukla (poet), Gujarati poet
- Rajendra Shukla (politician), Indian politician and MLA from Madhya Pradesh
- Rajendra Prasad Shukla, politician from Madhya Pradesh and Chhattisgarh, who also served as Speaker of both states' Legislative Assembly
- Rajesh Shukla, Indian politician and member of the Bharatiya Janata Party from Uttarakhand State
- Rajesh Shukla (statistician), Indian researcher, author and applied statistician
- Rakesh Shukla (animal welfare activist), Indian entrepreneur, motivational speaker and animal welfare activist
- Rakesh Shukla (cricketer), Indian cricketer, cricket consultant and commentator
- Ram Chandra Shukla (1925–2016), Indian painter and art critic
- Ram Kishore Shukla, Indian National Congress leader
- Ramchandra Shukla (1884–1941), known as Acharya Shukla, Indian historian of Hindi literature
- Ravishankar Shukla, premier of CP & Berar and the first Chief Minister of Madhya Pradesh
- Ravikant Shukla, Indian first class cricketer, former captain of India U19 national cricket team
- Ravi Kishan, or Ravindra Shyamnarayan Shukla, Indian actor, politician and TV personality; MP (Lok Sabha) from Gorakhpur, Uttar Pradesh
- Richa Moorjani (nee Shukla), Indian-American actress who is best known for her role as Kamala in the series Never Have I Ever
- Rishi Kumar Shukla, Indian Police Service officer and director of Central Bureau of Investigation (CBI)
- Rishabh Shukla, Indian film and television actor and a voice-dubbing artist
- Riya Shukla, Indian television actress and model who made her film debut with Nil Battey Sannata
- Rohit Shukla, Major at the Indian Army, Shaurya Chakra awardee
- Samridhii Shukla, Indian TV actress
- Sanyam Shukla, Indian badminton player
- S.N.Shukla, Indian politician
- Sandeep Shukla, Professor at the Indian Institute of Technology, Kanpur
- Saurabh Shukla, Indian actor
- Shilpa Shukla, Indian actress
- Shivakant Shukla, Indian cricketer
- Shiv Pratap Shukla, Governor of Himachal Pradesh, Former Member of Parliament (Rajya Sabha), former Minister of State for Finance, Government of India
- Shyama Charan Shukla, three-term Chief Minister of Madhya Pradesh, irrigation visionary and aviator
- Sidharth Shukla, Indian actor and model.
- Shrilal Shukla (1925–2011), Hindi writer, recipient of the Jnanpith Award
- Shri Prakash Shukla, Indian gangster and contract killer
- Supriya Shukla, Indian television and film actress
- Umesh Shukla, Indian movie director, best known for Oh My God
- Vidya Charan Shukla, Indian cabinet minister
- Vijai Shukla, Indian-Danish food scientist
- Vijay Kumar Shukla, or Munna Shukla, former Member of the Legislative Assembly (MLA) from Bihar, India
- Vikramaditya Shukla, Indian film actor who has appeared in Tamil and Telugu language films
- Vinay Shukla, Indian film writer and director, producer of Godmother
- Vinod Kumar Shukla, modern Hindi writer and recipient of the Sahitya Akademi Award
- Yogendra Shukla, Indian nationalist, freedom fighter, among the founders of Hindustan Socialist Republican ASSOCIATION

Others

- Shuklaganj, a suburb of Kanpur, Uttar Pradesh, situated on the banks of holy river Ganges
