= Gas War =

Gas War may refer to:

- Bolivian Gas War
- Russia-Belarus energy dispute
- Russia-Ukraine gas dispute
- Gas Wars: Crony Capitalism and the Ambanis, a book by Paranjoy Guha Thakurta
