= Samiksha =

Samiksha or Sameksha or Sameeksha may refer to:

- Sameeksha Sud, Indian actress
- Sameksha (born 1985), Indian actress
- Samiksha Bhatnagar, Indian actress
- Samiksha Jaiswal, Indian television actress

== See also ==
- Samikshavad, modern Indian art movement
