= Paranjoy Guha Thakurta =

Indian journalist, writer and filmmaker

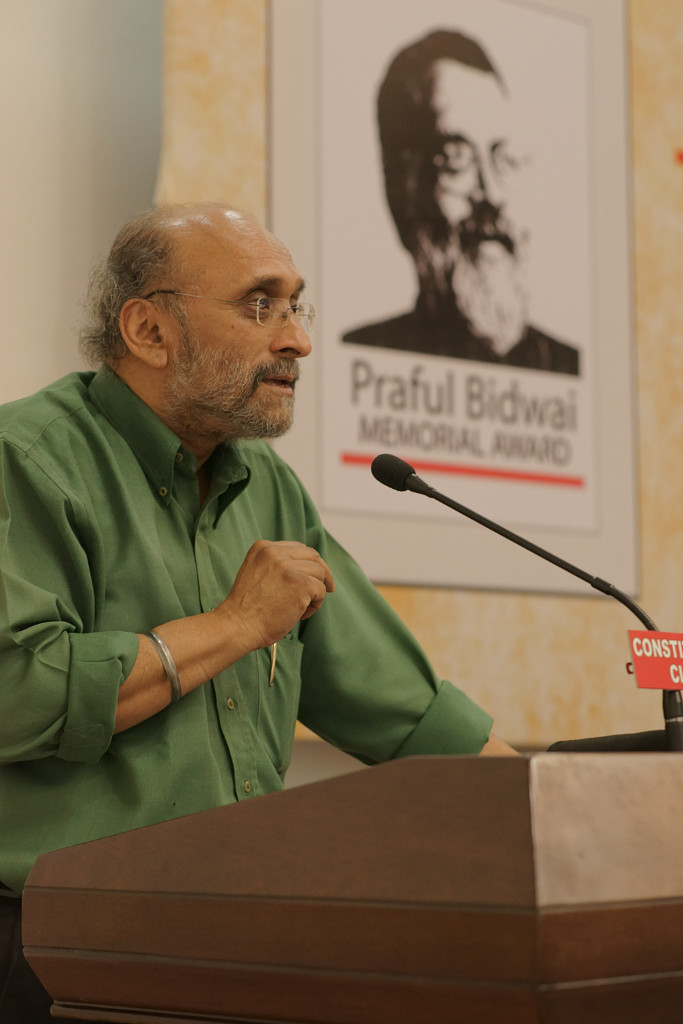
- Paranjoy Guha Thakurta - June 2016
- Born: 5 October 1955 (age 70); Kolkata, West Bengal, India
- Education: University of Delhi
- Occupations: Journalist, writer
- Notable work: Gas Wars
- Relatives: Tapati Guha-Thakurta (sister)
- Website: paranjoy.in

Paranjoy Guha Thakurta (born 5 October 1955) is an Indian journalist, writer, publisher, documentary film maker and teacher. He has been a guest faculty member at IIM Ahmedabad for 18 consecutive years, and also taught at the IIMs at Calcutta and Shillong, the University of Delhi, Jawaharlal Nehru University, Asian College of Journalism and Jamia Millia Islamia among other educational institutions. He is the only Indian journalist referred to in the famous Hindenburg Report on Adani.

== Career ==
Guha Thakurta was educated at La Martiniere Calcutta, pursued his undergraduate degree in economics from St. Stephen's College and completed his master's degree from Delhi School of Economics in 1977. With the Emergency of 1975–77, he decided to be a journalist over being a lecturer. In June 1977, he joined a Kolkata-based magazine as assistant editor. Through his career spanning over 45 years, he has been associated with major media houses like Business India, Businessworld, The Telegraph, India Today and The Pioneer. He also hosted the chat show India Talks on CNBC-India which ran over 1400 episodes.

In 2013, he directed a short documentary film Coal Curse which highlighted the wrongs in the Indian coal mining industry. The 45-minute film, supported by Greenpeace, delved into the political economy of coal in contemporary India with the Singrauli example serving as a case study. This was Guha Thakurta's second film on coal, the earlier one being 'Hot as hell: Why Jharia is burning', that was produced in 2006 by the Public Service Broadcasting Trust.

His 2014 book Gas Wars: Crony Capitalism and the Ambanis, co-authored with Subir Ghosh and Jyotirmoy Chaudhuri, dealt with alleged irregularities of the prices of natural gas in the Indian market. Reliance Industries Limited, one of India's major conglomerates which is also involved in oil and gas exploration and production, sent a legal notice to Guha Thakurta and others for defamation through this book.

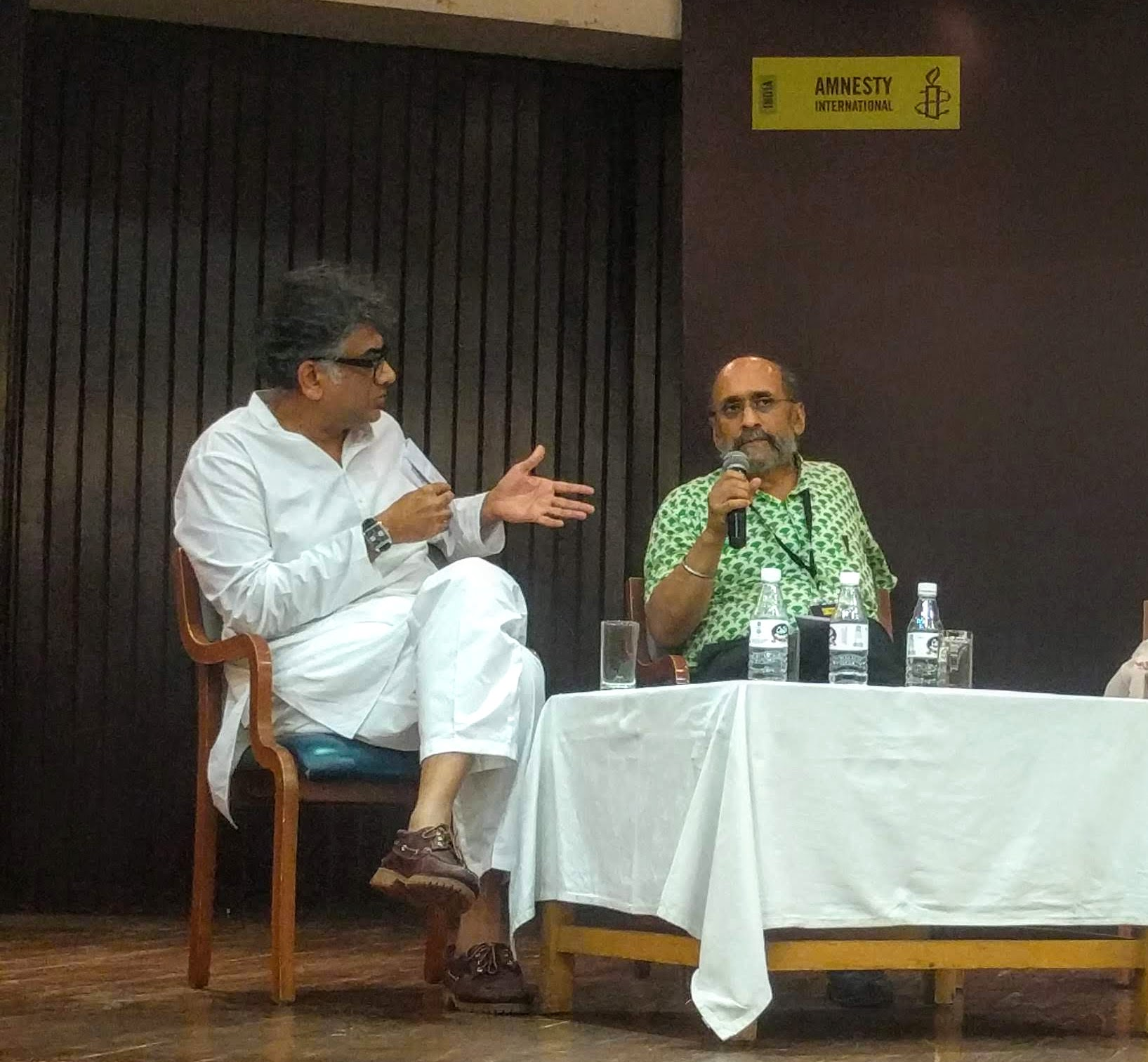
Paranjoy Guha Thakurta (right) and Aakar Patel (left) at an Amnesty International event in New Delhi.

In 2016, Guha Thakurta was appointed Editor of the Economic and Political Weekly (EPW) replacing C Rammanohar Reddy, who steered the prestigious journal since 2004. He co-authored an article about the Adani Group's tax evasion. The article brought to light how the Government tweaked the rules which favoured a certain company within the Adani Group to the tune of Rs 500 Crores. EPW tried to reach out to Ministry of Finance and Ministry of Industry and Commerce, but no explanation was given for this policy decision.

Following this, a defamation notice was sent to the Sameeksha Trust and the authors of the article. Fearing an expensive lawsuit by one of India's biggest corporate houses, Sameeksha Trust (which runs the journal EPW) decided to take down the article, prompting Paranjoy Guha Thakurta's resignation on July 18, 2017, over alleged differences with the board. The Adani Group is headed by Gautam Adani who is understood to be close to Prime Minister Narendra Modi.

The Hindenburg Research report on Adani published on January 24, 2023, alleged that Adani had engaged in a number of questionable practices, including opaque accounting, environmental violations, and bribery. The report caused a significant drop in Adani's share price and led to calls for investigations into the company's activities. Paranjoy Guha Thakurta is the only Indian journalist who was referred to in the report.

=== Paid news ===
Guha Thakurta was a member of the sub-committee set up by the Press Council of India to look into the malaise of paid news. Initially, the report titled Paid News: How Corruption in the Indian Media Undermines Democracy was to be released on 26 April 2010, but it was deferred after many members of the Council raised objections. A diluted version of the report, which was released on 30 July 2010, raised a storm. A number of newspaper establishments were named as having indulged in editorial malpractices. These included Bennett, Coleman and Co (owners of The Times of India), HT Media (owners of Hindustan Times, Hindustan and Mint), Dainik Jagran, Dainik Bhaskar, Punjab Kesari, Lokmat, Eenadu, and Sakshi group, among others.

In September 2010, the Central Information Commission (CIC) of India directed the council to make public the report as part of suo motu disclosure mandated under the Right to Information (RTI) Act.

Guha Thakurta has since written extensively on the issue of "paid news". In a December 2013 article for First Post, he explained why the malaise of "paid news" is a threat to democracy:

The independence of the media and its ability to bring about transparency in society by playing an adversarial role against the establishment get compromised because of corruption within the folds of the media itself. Paid news is one particularly egregious manifestation of the ills of the corporatized media that puts out information that poses as if it has been independently and objectively produced but has actually been paid for.

=== PIL on 2G case ===
Guha Thakurta was one of many well-known people who joined a public interest litigation in the 2G spectrum case, originally filed by the Centre for Public Interest Litigation (CPIL) led by lawyer Prashant Bhushan. He has written extensively on the scam, with the first article on the subject appearing in The Economic Times in November 2007. Soon after its publication, a legal notice was served on him by Reliance Communications.

=== Pegasus Spyware ===
Paranjoy Guha Thakurta was targeted with Pegasus spyware between April and July 2018. Through a forensic analysis, Amnesty International's Security Lab have confirmed that his phone was successfully compromised and that these infections were consistent with other known infection vectors.

== Works ==
=== Books ===
- A Time of Coalitions: Divided We Stand, 2004 SAGE; co-author Shankar Raghuraman, ISBN 0-7619-3237-2.
- Media Ethics, 2009 Oxford University Press, ISBN 978-0-19-807087-0.
- Gas Wars: Crony Capitalism and the Ambanis, 2014 Paranjoy Guha Thakurta; co-authors Subir Ghosh and Jyotirmoy Chaudhuri, ISBN 81-928551-3-9.
- Sue the Messenger: How legal arm-twisting by corporates is shackling reportage and undermining democracy in India; co-author with Subir Ghosh; 2016 Paranjoy and Authors UpFront, ISBN 978-93-84439-81-1.
- Thin Dividing Line: India, Mauritius and Global Illicit financial flows; co-authored with Shinzani Jain; 2017 Penguin Random House India, ISBN 978-81-8400-588-2.
- Loose Pages:Court Cases That Could Have Shaken India, co-author Sourya Majumder, ISBN 978-1-68454-924-5.
- The Real Face of Facebook in India: How Social Media have Become a Weapon and Disseminator of Disinformation and Falsehood, 2019 Paranjoy Guha Thakurta; co-author Cyril Sam, ISBN 1-64570-347-9
- A Million Mission: Non Profit Sector in India, 2014 Paranjoy; Author Mathew Cherian, ISBN 978-93-84439-04-0
- Calcutta Diary, 2014 Paranjoy; Author Ashok Mitra, ISBN 978-0-7146-3082-3
- The Modi Myth, 2015 Paranjoy; Author S. Nihal Singh, ISBN 978-93-84439-57-6
- Netaji: Living Dangerously, 2015 Paranjoy; Author Kingshuk Nag, ISBN 978-93-84439-69-9
- Idea of India Hard To Beat: Republic Resilient, 2016 Paranjoy; Author Badri Raina, ISBN 978-93-84439-76-7
- First Person Singular, 2016 Paranjoy; Author Ashok Mitra, ISBN 978-93-84439-65-1
- Encounters, 2016 Paranjoy; Author Ramnika Gupta, ISBN 978-93-84439-82-8
- Junkland Journeys: The witty story of how world is won by a whacky addict who discovers god in a dog, 2016 Paranjoy; Author Ajith Pillai, ISBN 93-84439-75-4
- Edward John Thompson: British Liberalism and the Limits of Rapprochement, 2016 Paranjoy; Author Shashi Raina, ISBN 1-5376-5043-2
- The Story of Secularism: 15th-21st Century, 2016 Paranjoy; Author Nalini Rajan, ISBN 978-93-84439-86-6
- Kashmir: A Noble Tryst in Tatters, 2017 Paranjoy; Author Badri Raina, ISBN 978-93-84439-97-2
- Chasing His Father's Dreams: Inside Story of Odisha's Longest Serving Chief Minister, 2017 Paranjoy; Author Biswajit Mohanty, ISBN 93-84439-90-8
- The Russian Revolution: And Storms Across A Century (1917-2017), 2017 Paranjoy; Author, Achala Moulik, ISBN 978-81-933924-0-9
- Alternative Futures: India Unshackled, 2017 AuthorsUpFront Paranjoy; Authors Ashish Kothari and K.J. Roy, ISBN 81-933924-7-7
- Grand Illusion: The GSPC Disaster and the Gujarat Model, 2017 Paranjoy; Author Subir Ghosh, ISBN 93-87280-02-0
- Corruption, CBI and I: More than Memories of a Veteran Scam-Buster, 2020 Paranjoy; Authors Shantonu Sen and Sanjukta Basu, ISBN 93-87280-59-4
- India's Long Walk Home, 2020 Paranjoy; Authors Ishan Chauhan and Zenaida Cubbinz, ISBN 978-93-87280-87-8
- India: The Wasted Years, 2021 Paranjoy; Author Avay Shukla, ISBN 979-8-5319-5345-2
- Electoral Democracy? An Inquiry into the Fairness and Integrity of Elections in India, 2022 Paranjoy; Edited by M.G. Devasahayam, ISBN 979-8-88525-098-6
- Flying Lies? The Role of Prime Minister Narendra Modi in India's Biggest Defence Scandal, 2022 Paranjoy; Authors Ravi Nair and Paranjoy Guha Thakurta, ISBN 979-8888626702
- The Queen of All Nations, 2023 Paranjoy; Author Abhijit Sengupta, ISBN 978-9394887329
- The Deputy Commissioner's Dog and Other Colleagues, 2023 Paranjoy; Author Avay Shukla, ISBN 978-9394887381
- Disappearing Democracy: Dismantling Of A Nation, 2024 Paranjoy; Author Avay Shukla, ISBN 978-9394887589
- Holy Cows And Loose Cannons: The Duffer Zone Chronicles, 2025 Paranjoy; Author Avay Shukla, ISBN 9394887474
- The Dark Side Of News Fixing: The Culture And political Economy Of Global Media In Pakistan And Afghanistan, 2025 Paranjoy, Authors Upfront; Author Syed Irfan Ashraf, ISBN 9394887504
- An Unflattering Story About Ola's Bhavish Aggarwal: Behind the Incredible Rise and Impending Fall of an Indian Unicorn, 2025 Paranjoy; Author Sourya Majumder, Paranjoy Guha Thakurta, ISBN 8198727299

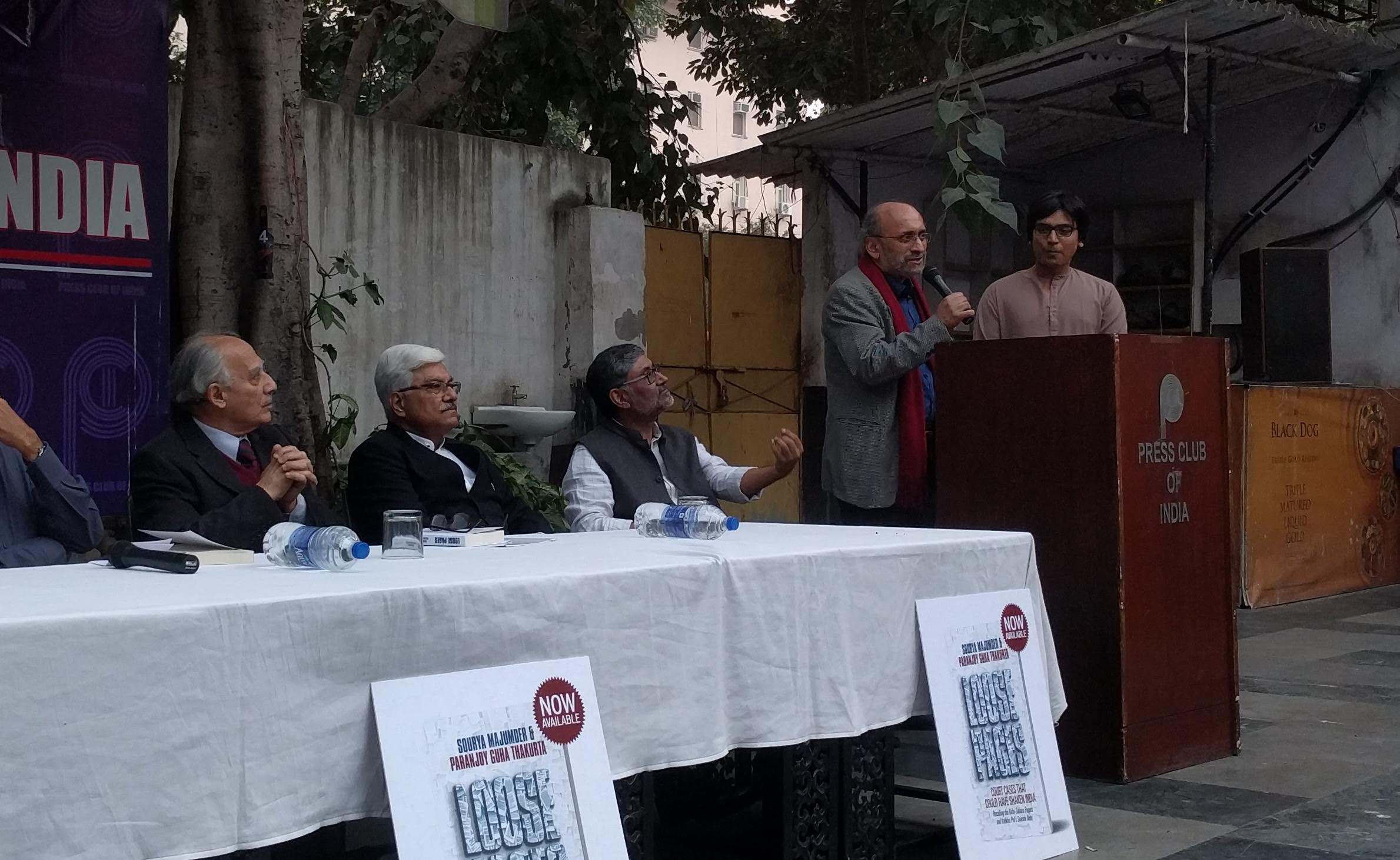
ISBNDuring the book launch of "Loose Pages: Court Cases That Could Have Shaken India" at the Press Club of India. Visible in the picture are the authors, Paranjoy Guha Thakurta and Sourya Majumder at the podium. Arun Shourie is also visible.

=== Documentaries ===
- Idiot Box or Window of Hope, 2003
- Hot As Hell: A Profile of Dhanbad, 2006
- Grabbing Eyeballs: What's Unethical About Television News in India, 2007
- Advertorial: Selling News or Products?, 2009
- So Near Yet So Far, 2009
- Blood & Iron: A Story of the Convergence of Crime, Business and Politics in Southern India, 2010-11
- The Great Indian Telecom Robbery, 2011
- Freedom Song, 2012
- Children In Crossfire, 2013
- A Thin Dividing Line, 2014
- Coal Curse, 2013
- In the Heart of Our Darkness: The Life and Death of Mahendra Karma, 2013
- Inferno: Jharkhand's Underground Fires, 2015
- Even it Up, 2015
- Farzi:Vypam Ka Vyapaar, 2018
- Unfair,2019
- India's Children: Gorakhpur's Broken Public Health, 2019
- Anand Vihar: Workers on the Longest Walk of their Lives, 2020
- Migrant Workers: Stranded and Scared, 2020
- What Bengal Thinks Today, 2021
- Anjan Ghosh Tribute, 2021
- Who's Dharavi's Boss, 2023
- Maharashtra Manipulated? How Elections Were Stolen in India's 2nd Largest State, 2025
- "महाराष्ट्रात सगळ्यात मोठी चोरी कशी झाली पहा?" | Full Documentary, Marathi, 2025
- बिहार की रणभूमि | Battleground Bihar | Full Documentary, Hindi, 2025

=== Music Videos ===
- Dike Dike Hao Hushiar, 2021 (Producer and Director), Featuring The Fiddler's Green
- Dharti Tumhari, Dharti Hamari, 2021 (Producer and Director), Featuring Deepak Castelino
- Sangram/Struggle, 2023
- Dharavi ka Dada Kaun - Noor Hasan, Lil White, and Rekoil Chafe (Producer) 2023
- साहेब/Saheb - (Producer) Aditi, Rajesh Nirmal, Vedi Sinha, Amartya Ghosh
- સાહેબ/Saheb: Gujarati (Producer) Rajesh Nirmal, Vedi Sinha, Amartya Ghosh
- साधो/Sadho: (Producer) Rahul Ram, Avinash Sourav, Ashok Vajpeyi, Dhruv Shukla
- गोदी जी/Godi ji - (Producer) Aditi, Manan Kumar, Amartya Ghosh
- आम्ही धारावीकर/We're from Dharavi - (Producer) Shital Sathe
- Bulldozer Raaj song - (Producer)
- ‘Phooljhadiyan’ | Music Video -(Producer)
- TV Bimar Hai - Music Video
- गायब! (Gaayab!) (Missing!) | Full Song
- সাহেব/Saheb : Bengali Music Video
- গায়েব! | Gaayab! | Missing! | Bengali Music Video - English Subtitles
