= Henry Glassie =

American Folklorist

- Born: March 24, 1941 (age 85)
- Children: 4, including Ellen Adair
- Awards: Guggenheim Fellowship; Charles Homer Haskins Prize Lecture

Academic background
- Education: University of Pennsylvania (PhD) SUNY Oneonta (MA) Tulane University (BA)

Academic work
- Discipline: Folklore, Ethnomusicology
- Sub-discipline: Anthropology, American studies, Cultural studies
- Institutions: University of Pennsylvania; Pennsylvania State University; Indiana University, Bloomington
- Notable works: Passing the Time in Ballymenone (1982); The Spirit of Folk Art (1989); Turkish Traditional Art Today (1993); Vernacular Architecture (2000)
- Notable ideas: Vernacular architecture

Henry Glassie (born 24 March 1941) is an American folklorist. He is College Professor Emeritus at Indiana University Bloomington, has done fieldwork on five continents and written books on the full range of folkloristic interest, from drama, song, and story to craft, art, and architecture. Three of his books -- Passing the Time in Ballymenone, The Spirit of Folk Art, and Turkish Traditional Art Today—were named among the "Notable Books of the Year" by The New York Times. Glassie has won many awards for his work, including the Charles Homer Haskins Prize of the American Council of Learned Societies for a distinguished career of humanistic scholarship. A film on his work, directed by Pat Collins and titled Henry Glassie: Field Work, had its world premiere at the Toronto International Film Festival in 2019.

== Life and career ==
Glassie received his B.A. from Tulane University in 1964, his M.A. from the Cooperstown Graduate Program of the State University of New York at Oneonta in 1965, and his PhD from the University of Pennsylvania in 1969. After serving as the State Folklorist of Pennsylvania and teaching at Penn State Harrisburg, Glassie began teaching in the Folklore Institute at Indiana University Bloomington in 1970. In 1976, he became the chairman of the Department of Folklore and Folklife at the University of Pennsylvania. In 1988, he returned as a College Professor to Indiana University, where he had appointments in Folklore and Ethnomusicology, American Studies, Central Eurasian Studies, Ancient Near East Studies, and India Studies. He retired in 2008.

Glassie has served as president of the American Folklore Society, the Vernacular Architecture Forum, and his local historic preservation organization, Bloomington Restorations Incorporated. He is married to fellow folklorist Pravina Shukla, a professor at Indiana University, who is a teacher and the author of two major books on dress and adornment, The Grace of Four Moons and Costume. Glassie and Shukla co-authored Sacred Art, an Ethnographic Account of creativity in Northeastern Brazil. Glassie has four children and four grandchildren.

Henry Glassie began doing fieldwork on the songs, stories, and architecture of the Southern Appalachian region in 1961. He has since done fieldwork in several regions of the United States, and in Ireland, England, Sweden, Italy, Turkey, Pakistan, India, Bangladesh, China, Japan, Nigeria, and Brazil. He published his first scholarly paper, an article on the Appalachian log cabin, in 1963. Since then, he has published over 100 articles and a steady stream of books.

== Books by Henry Glassie ==
- Pattern in the Material Folk Culture of the Eastern United States, 1968.
- Folk Housing in Middle Virginia: A Structural Analysis of Historic Artifacts, 1976.
- All Silver and No Brass: An Irish Christmas Mumming, 1976.
- Irish Folk History: Texts from the North, 1982.
- Passing the Time in Ballymenone: Culture and History of an Ulster Community, 1982.
- Irish Folktales, 1985.
- The Spirit of Folk Art, 1989.
- Günümüzde Geleneksel Türk Sanatı, 1993.
- Turkish Traditional Art Today, 1993.
- Art and Life in Bangladesh, 1997.
- Material Culture, 1999.
- The Potter’s Art, 1999.
- Vernacular Architecture, 2000.
- The Stars of Ballymenone, 2006.
- Prince Twins Seven-Seven: His Art, His Life in Nigeria, His Exile in America, 2010.
- Daniel Johnston: A Portrait of the Artist as a Potter in North Carolina, 2020.

== Books co-authored by Henry Glassie ==
- with MacEdward Leach, A Guide for Collectors of Oral Traditions and Folk Cultural Material in Pennsylvania, 1968.
- with Austin and Alta Fife, eds., Forms upon the Frontier: Folklife and Folk Art in the United States, 1969.
- with Edward D. Ives and John F. Szwed, Folksongs and Their Makers, 1970.
- with Linda Dégh and Felix Oinas, eds., Folklore Today: A Festschrift for Richard M. Dorson, 1976.
- with Firoz Mahmud, Living Traditions, 2007.
- with Clifford R. Murphy and Douglas Dowling Peach, Ola Belle Reed and Southern Mountain Music on the Mason-Dixon Line, 2015.
- with Vincent Woods, Borderlines, 2018.
- with Pravina Shukla, Sacred Art: Catholic Saints and Candomblé Gods in Modern Brazil, 2018.

== Honors and awards ==
- Guggenheim Fellowship, 1972.
- Fellow, National Humanities Institute, Yale University, 1975.
- Fellow, American Folklore Society, 1976.
- Passing the Time in Ballymenone: Chicago Folklore Prize, 1983; Haney Prize in the Social Sciences, 1982; New York Times notable book of the year, 1982.
- American Folklore Society, Centennial Award of the Folk Art Section, 1989.
- Folklore Fellow, Finnish Academy of Science and Letters, 1990.
- The Spirit of Folk Art, Kiffen Award of the Pioneer American Society, 1990; New York Times notable book of the year, 1990.
- Award of Honor for Superior Service to Turkish Culture from the Ministry of Culture and Tourism (Turkey), 1993.
- Douglas Distinguished Service Award of the Pioneer American Society, 1993.
- Turkish Traditional Art Today: New York Times notable book of the year, 1994.
- Outstanding Achievement in the Arts Award from the Assembly of Turkish American Associations, 1995.
- Teaching Excellence Recognition Award, Indiana University, 1997.
- Art and Life in Bangladesh: Certificate of Honour from the Ministry of Cultural Affairs (Bangladesh), 1998; Crest of Honour, Islamic University, Kushtia, Bangladesh, 1998.
- Warren Roberts Award from Bloomington Restorations Incorporated, 2000.
- Encomium for service to historic preservation, Bloomington City Council, 2000.
- Friend of Bangladesh Award, FOBANA, 2000.
- Vernacular Architecture: Abbott Lowell Cummings Award of the Vernacular Architecture Forum, 2001.
- Fatih University, Istanbul, Board of Trustees Recognition for Contributions to Turkish Cultural Life, 2001.
- Kütahya, Turkey, Municipal Government Award of Honorary Citizenship, 2010.
- American Folklore Society Award for a Lifetime of Scholarly Achievement, 2010.
- Prince Twins Seven-Seven: Nigerian Studies Association Book Award, 2011.
- Charles Homer Haskins Prize of the American Council of Learned Societies, 2011.
- Ola Belle Reed: Certificate of Merit from the Association for Recorded Sound Collections, 2016.

== Lectures ==
Henry Glassie has lectured throughout the United States and Canada, and in Ireland, Scotland, Wales, England, Norway, Sweden, Finland, Denmark, Germany, Estonia, France, Malta, Turkey, Israel, Kuwait, India, Bangladesh, China, and Japan.

== Exhibitions ==
- “The People and Traditions of West Fermanagh,” Fermanagh County Museum, Enniskillen, Northern Ireland, 1983–1984.
- “Turkish Traditional Art Today,” Museum of International Folk Art, Santa Fe, New Mexico, 1991–1993.
- “Turkish Traditional Art Today,” Eskenazi Museum of Art, Bloomington, Indiana, 1993.
- “Art as Spirit: The Art of Hinduism and Islam,” Eskenazi Museum of Art, Bloomington, Indiana, 1998.
- “Contemporary Traditional Art of Bangladesh,” Bangladesh National Museum, Dhaka, Bangladesh, 2000.
- “The Art of Prince Twins Seven-Seven,” Material Culture, Philadelphia, Pennsylvania, 2010.

== Consulting ==
- Conner Prairie Pioneer Settlement, Noblesville, Indiana, 1971–1976.
- Plimoth Patuxet, Plymouth, Massachusetts, 1973.
- Ulster-American Folk Park, County Tyrone, Northern Ireland, 1972–1982.
- American Frontier Culture Foundation, 1982–1992.
- Rockefeller Foundation, 1999.
- Silk Road Program, Smithsonian Institution, 2000–2002.

== Writings about Glassie ==
- Charles Joyner, “The Narrowing Gyre: Henry Glassie, Irish Folk Culture, and the American South,” in Joyner, Shared Traditions, Urbana: University of Illinois Press, 1999, pp. 166–73.
- Gregory Hansen, “An Interview with Henry Glassie,” Folklore Forum, 31:2 (2000): 91–113.
- Mark P. Leone, “Henry Glassie and the General Meaning of Things,” The Public Historian 23:3 (2001): 83–87.
- Barbara Truesdell, “A Life in the Field: Henry Glassie and the Study of Material Culture,” The Public Historian, 30:4 (2008): 59–87.
- Ray Cashman, Tom Mould, and Pravina Shukla, “A Folklorist’s Work: Henry Glassie’s Life in the Field,” in Cashman, Mould, and Shukla, eds. The Individual and Tradition, Bloomington: Indiana University Press, 2011, pp. 499–528.

== Film about Glassie and his work ==
- Pat Collins. Henry Glassie: Fieldwork. Ireland: South Wind Blows and Harvest Films, 2019.

== Archives ==
Glassie's papers, correspondence, and drafts of books, are in the Indiana University Archives. Some manuscripts are also held in the University of Pennsylvania University Archives.

Glassie's field recordings from Ireland and the United States are in the Archives of Traditional Music at Indiana University.
