= Sue the Messenger =

Book written by Subir Ghosh

Sue the Messenger: How legal arm-twisting by corporates is shackling reportage and undermining democracy in India
- First edition
- Author: Subir Ghosh, with Paranjoy Guha Thakurta
- Language: English
- Genre: Non-fiction
- Published: 2016
- Publication place: India
- Media type: Print/E-book
- Pages: 252pp (Paperback)
- ISBN: 978-93-84439-81-1

Sue the Messenger: How legal arm-twisting by corporates is shackling reportage and undermining democracy in India is a book written by Subir Ghosh, with Paranjoy Guha Thakurta. The book was released at a gathering in New Delhi on 4 May 2016.

== Overview ==
Lead author Ghosh said in an interview the day before the launch: "In an era where unabated corporatisation of the media, prevalence of unprofessional/sub-standard journalism, and the widespread malaise of paid news seem to be the order of the day, we felt that there are still those who try to write/report to the best of their ability and means, but are prevented from doing so through legal coercion by corporate entities, or are harassed later on for simply doing their work." Speaking about the book which establishes a link between politics and corporate crime, Ghosh told India Legal magazine, "If you stop journalists from doing their work and writing about corruption, the public will be robbed of their right to know. Ultimately, it is the democratic process that takes a hit. SLAPP suits are intended to have a chilling effect on others, apart from persecuting journalists who are doing their job."

The context of the book was elaborated by lead author Ghosh in an interview: "It is our understanding that there is a problem with reportage about Indian corporates and the hounding of writers and journalists that comes along with that. When journalists and writers are stopped from or prosecuted for reporting, writing or analysing [these issues], it is the citizenry that is deprived of their right to know. We felt that the people of this country need to know about this issue, and hence the book."

The book has been published by Guha Thakurta, with the publishing facilitation being done by AuthorsUpFront.
