= Subir Ghosh =

Indian journalist and writer (born 1966)

- Born: 7 September 1966 (age 60); Calcutta, India
- Occupations: Journalist; Author
- Website: www.subirghosh.in

Subir Ghosh (born 7 September 1966) is an Indian journalist and writer, whose works have appeared in print and online since 1991. His areas of focus are environment, human rights, conflict and Northeast India.

He currently resides in Bangalore.

== Career ==
Among others, Ghosh has worked with news agency Press Trust of India, and newspapers The Telegraph and Daily News & Analysis (DNA). He has also worked with environmental organisations Centre for Science and Environment (CSE) and Wildlife Trust of India (WTI)., besides serving as an Advisory Council member with the Centre for North East Studies and Policy Research (C-NES).

Among other things, Ghosh is currently Contributing Editor with the B2B textiles and apparel magazine, Fibre2Fashion.

== Books ==
Ghosh's first major book was 'Frontier Travails: Northeast - The Politics of a Mess', published in 2001.

He is co-author of the 2014 non-fiction title Gas Wars: Crony Capitalism and the Ambanis, co-authored with Paranjoy Guha Thakurta and Jyotirmoy Chaudhuri, which examined alleged irregularities of prices of natural gas in the Indian market. Reliance Industries Limited, one of India's major conglomerates which is also involved in oil and gas exploration and production, sent a legal notice to Guha Thakurta, Ghosh and Chaudhuri for alleged defamation through this book.

In May 2016, he published the non-fiction work Sue the Messenger: How legal arm-twisting by corporates is shackling reportage and undermining democracy in India. Ghosh was the lead author of this book, and Guha Thakurta the co-author. The book dealt with corporate strategic lawsuits against public participation (SLAPPs) against writers and journalists in India. Speaking about the book which establishes a link between politics and corporate crime, Ghosh told India Legal magazine, "If you stop journalists from doing their work and writing about corruption, the public will be robbed of their right to know. Ultimately, it is the democratic process that takes a hit. SLAPP suits are intended to have a chilling effect on others, apart from persecuting journalists who are doing their job."

== Bibliography ==
- The Dream Machine, co-authored with Richa Bansal; 1997 Children's Book Trust; ISBN 81-7011-778-X
- Frontier Travails: Northeast - The Politics of a Mess; 2001 Macmillan India; ISBN 0-333-93601-9
- Gas Wars: Crony Capitalism and the Ambanis; Paranjoy Guha Thakurta; Subir Ghosh and Jyotirmoy Chaudhuri; 2014 Paranjoy and Authors UpFront; ISBN 978-81-928551-2-7
- Sue the Messenger: How legal arm-twisting by corporates is shackling reportage and undermining democracy in India; Subir Ghosh, with Paranjoy Guha Thakurta; 2016 Paranjoy and AuthorsUpFront; ISBN 978-93-84439-81-1.
- On the Face of it: Chronicle of a Self-Imposed Exile; 2017 Subir Ghosh and AuthorsUpFront; ISBN 978-16-84180-20-2.
- Grand Illusion: The GSPC Disaster and the Gujarat Model; 2017 Paranjoy and AuthorsUpFront; ISBN 978-93-87280-02-1.
