= Gas Wars =

2014 book

Gas Wars: Crony Capitalism and the Ambanis
- Author: Paranjoy Guha Thakurta, Subir Ghosh and Jyotirmoy Chaudhuri
- Language: English
- Genre: Non-fiction
- Published: 2014
- Publication place: India
- Media type: Print/E-book
- Pages: 588pp (Hardback)
- ISBN: 97-881-92855-127

Gas Wars: Crony Capitalism and the Ambanis is a book written by Indian journalists Paranjoy Guha Thakurta, Subir Ghosh and Jyotirmoy Chaudhuri. The book was officially released on 15 April 2014. The book deals with the issue of irregularities in the determination of the price of natural gas in India.

== Overview ==
In the book, the authors claim to cover all the issues regarding the extraction of natural gas from the Krishna Godavari Basin. After a few publishers refused to accept the book unmodified, the Guha Thakurta decided to self-publish it. He choose the internet as the primary mode of distribution to avoid facing litigation, like those faced by the publishers of The Descent of Air India and Sahara: The Untold Story.

The book covers the various important aspect on the gas drilling in Krishna Godavari Basin. It also covers the legal dispute between Mukesh Ambani and Anil Ambani over the pricing of gas supply between their two firms. It discusses technical issues of deep-sea drilling. It also includes an investigative report prepared by the Comptroller and Auditor General of India (CAG) of the alleged malpractices of Reliance Industries Ltd. (RIL).

The books also claims the political system of India has created crony capitalism in India. It claims that in sectors like infrastructure and energy, a few firms are getting project deals in exchange for political contribution. The book claims the CAG report states that the government prepared contracts that were favourable to RIL and the Prime Minister changed Petroleum Ministers to favour the firm.

== Defamation notice ==
On 17 April 2014, Reliance Industries Ltd. (RIL) sent a legal notice to the authors and the publishers. The notice claimed that the firm and its chairman were being defamed for personal gain. The notice also accused the distributors of the ebook version, Flipkart and Amazon, of conspiracy. Deepshikha Shankar, an event manager, who sent out the invitations for the book release was also accused by the notice. The notice claimed that the book was in contempt of the Supreme Court of India as a Public Interest Litigation (PIL) regarding the Krishna Godavari Basin is still pending in the court. The notice alleged that the book has tried to create a negative image of the firm when the lawsuit is still under arbitration.

The notice demanded that the sales of the book be stopped and all existing copies in all forms be destroyed. The notice also demanded a public apology and threatened litigation if their demands were not met.

Guha Thakurta responded to the notice by saying that the book was balanced as it quoted RIL's version of the events too. He mentioned that it also included interviews with RIL personnel like B. K. Ganguly. He said that the authors were exercising their right to free expression under the Article 19(1)(a) of the Constitution. He added that this was an act of intimidation and harassment and they will apply a proper legal response.

On 23 April 2014, RIL sent another legal notice to authors and distributors seeking ₹100 crore in damages, to be paid within 10 days of the notice.
