= Deepak Shukla =

American virologist

- Born: Varanasi, India
- Education: Kendriya Vidyalaya BHU, Banaras Hindu University, Northwestern University, University of Illinois Chicago
- Known for: Herpesvirus entry receptor, virus host interactions, Herpes simplex keratitis, Anti-HSV peptides, Heparanase as a proviral and prodisease enzyme, Optineurin as antiviral protein, and repurposing of FDA drugs as a therapy for HSV-1
- Awards: American Herpes Foundation - Award for Excellence in meritorious Herpesvirus Research (2001), Lew Wasserman Merit Award (2009), UIC Researcher of the Year (2018), UIC Inventor of the Year (2024), and U of I Scholar (2023).
- Scientific career
- Fields: Herpes virology, Corneal Pathology, Antiviral Drugs, Antiviral Vaccines
- Workplaces: University of Illinois at Chicago

Deepak Shukla (born in India) is an American molecular virologist with expertise in herpesviruses. He discovered one of the main HSV-1 entry receptors and established a link between the receptors and HSV-1 induced ocular diseases such as keratitis and retinitis.As a group leader for the last 25 years he has focused on driving discoveries to combat HSV-1 and HSV-2 diseases by investigating viral pathogenesis, molecular and immunological mechanisms, and developing novel vaccine and antiviral compounds. He has authored over 200 research papers and several book chapters on herpes viruses.

== Early life and education ==
Shukla was born in the University Hospital of Banaras Hindu University, Varanasi. He studied at Kendriya Vidyalaya BHU and obtained his bachelor's degree in chemistry from BHU. He also obtained a master's degree in biochemistry before joining the University of Illinois at Chicago (UIC) for a PhD degree in microbiology and immunology. In 1996 he was awarded his PhD. He received his postdoctoral training with Patricia Spear at Northwestern University in Chicago.

== Family ==
He is the youngest son of Mr. and Mrs. Ram Chandra Shukla. He has six siblings: Rekha, Pradeep, Dileep, Prakash, Rachana, and Anand, who all live in India. Deepak Shukla is a naturalized citizen of the US.

== Work and awards ==
In 2001 Shukla joined UIC as an assistant professor of virology. He is jointly employed by the UIC Department of Ophthalmology and Visual Science and the Department of Microbiology and Immunology. Currently, he serves as the Marion H. Schenk Esq. Professor in Ophthalmology. He is a Distinguished UIC Professor of virology and the director of the Ocular Virology Laboratory of UIC.

Shukla has been directly associated with the discoveries of HSV-1 entry receptors, 3-O. Besides 3-O sulfated heparan sulfate, he also cloned and characterized the receptors (HVEM, nectin-1 and 3-O sulfated heparan sulfate) for experimental HSV-1 infection in mice. His more recent works include identification of a phagocytosis-like pathway for HSV-1 entry into ocular cells, significance of heparan sulfate in ocular infection, significance of autophagy in herpes infection, and development of a nanoparticle based herpes vaccine. He also discovered viral surfing in herpesviruses. His laboratory was first to implicate heparanase in HSV-1 release and syndecans in HSV-1 entry and cell-to-cell fusion. He has also used his knowledge of HSV-1 entry mechanism to identify new pharmaceutical agents to protect and treat HSV-1 infection in laboratory animals. His work has also focused on genital herpes and ways to control the spread of the disease.

His work has been recognized with merit awards and research grants from various organizations, including from the American Herpes Foundation (2001) for herpesvirus research and his discovery of a receptor for HSV-1 entry; the National Institute of Allergy and Infectious Diseases (2002–present); the Illinois Society to Prevent Blindness (2004); The Glaucoma Foundation (2007 and 2010); and the National Eye Institute (2013–present). Shukla received the Lew Wasserman Merit Award from Research to Prevent Blindness in 2009. He has also been awarded the UIC Researcher of the Year (2018) and UIC Inventor of the year (2024). Additionally, he has been bestowed upon the University of Illinois Scholar Award(2023 -2026). He is also an elected fellow of the American Academy of Microbiology (AAM), Fellow of the American Association for the Advancement of Science (AAAS), and Fellow of the Association for Research in Vision and Ophthalmology (ARVO).

== Selected works ==
- "A novel role for 3-O-sulfated heparan Sulfate in herpes simplex virus 1 entry" (1999)
- "A novel role for phagocytosis-like uptake in herpes simplex virus entry" (2006)
- "Viral entry mechanisms: simplicity drives complexity" (2009)
- "Herpesviruses and heparan sulfate: an intimate relationship in aid of viral entry" (2001)
- "Striking similarity of murine nectin-1alpha to human nectin-1alpha (HveC) in sequence and activity as a glycoprotein D receptor for alphaherpesvirus entry." (2000)
- "A novel role for phagocytosis-like uptake in herpes simplex virus entry" (2000)
- "Anti-heparan sulfate peptides that block herpes simplex virus infection in vivo." (2011)
- "A novel function of heparan sulfate in the regulation of cell-cell fusion." (2009)
- "Heparanase is a host enzyme required for herpes simplex virus-1 release from cells." (2015)
- "Prophylactic, therapeutic and neutralizing effects of zinc oxide tetrapod structures against herpes simplex virus type-2 infection." (2012)
- "Autophagy stimulation abrogates herpes simplex virus-1 infection." (2015)
- "Extended Release of an Anti-Heparan Sulfate Peptide From a Contact Lens Suppresses Corneal Herpes Simplex Virus-1 Infection." (2016)
- "Intravaginal Zinc Oxide Tetrapod Nanoparticles as Novel Immunoprotective Agents against Genital Herpes." (2016)
- "Cultured corneas show dendritic spread and restrict herpes simplex virus infection that is not observed with cultured corneal cells." (2017)
- “Viral activation of heparanase drives pathogenesis of herpes simplex virus-1” (2017)
- “An off-target effect of BX795 blocks herpes simplex virus type 1 infection of the eye” (2018)
- “Host enzymes heparanase and cathepsin L promote herpes simplex virus 2 release from cells” (2018)
- “Drug-encapsulated carbon (DECON): a novel platform for enhanced drug delivery” (2019)
- “Standalone or combinatorial phenylbutyrate therapy shows excellent antiviral activity and mimics CREB3 silencing” (2020)
- “OPTN is a host intrinsic restriction factor against neuroinvasive HSV-1 infection” (2021)
- “mTORC2 confers neuroprotection and potentiates immunity during virus infection” (2021)
- “Pathophysiology of reinfection by exogenous HSV-1 is driven by heparanase dysfunction” (2023)
- “HPSE-mediated proinflammatory signaling contributes to neurobehavioral deficits following intranasal HSV-1 infection” (2025)
