= Narayan Shukla =

Indian judge

Narayan Shukla (born 18 July 1958) also known as SN Shukla was an Allahabad High Court Judge in India. The Chief Justice of India Dipak Misra has written to the President of India recommending his removal for his alleged involvement in the medical college admission scam.

In January 2018, a three-judge in-house committee found that there was sufficient substance in the allegations against Justice Shukla and the irregularities were serious enough to call for initiation of proceedings for his removal. Subsequently, the then Chief Justice of India, Dipak Mishra asked him to either resign or seek voluntary retirement. After Justice Shukla refused to do either, Dipak Mishra had asked the Chief Justice of Allahabad High Court to not assign him judicial work.

Justice Shukla has retired on 17 July 2020. Judges of high courts of India hold office until they attain the age of 62 years.
