= Pravina Shukla =

American folklorist

- Born: November 15, 1968 (age 57)
- Occupation: University Professor
- Years active: 1993-present
- Known for: American folklorist

Pravina Shukla is an American folklorist who is Provost Professor of Folklore at Indiana University Bloomington and serves as an adjunct faculty member in the Department of Anthropology, Department of American Studies, the Dhar India Studies Program, and the Center for Latin American and Caribbean Studies. She is also a consulting curator at the Mathers Museum of World Cultures.

== Education ==
Shukla received her B.A. in Anthropology, with a minor in Ethnic Studies, in 1992 from the University of California, Berkeley, her M.A. in Folklore and Mythology in 1994 from the University of California, Los Angeles, and her Ph.D. in Folklore and Mythology in 1998 from the University of California, Los Angeles with a minor in Art History.

== Career ==
From 1993 to 1995, Shukla worked at the UCLA Fowler Museum of World Cultures, and from 1999 to 2000 she worked in the Anthropology Division of the American Museum of Natural History in New York City.

In 2000, Shukla began her employment at Indiana University, Bloomington as an assistant professor of folklore; in 2006 she became an associate professor; in 2017, she became professor of folklore. At Indiana University, Shukla has won the Trustees Teaching Award four times (2002, 2007, 2010, 2016) and the President's Award for Distinguished Teaching in 2018. In 2021, Shukla was named provost professor by the Office of the Provost and the Office of the Vice Provost for Faculty and Academic Affairs. The named professorship acknowledges faculty who have achieved local, national, and international distinction in both teaching and research/creative activity.

Her research areas include material culture, museum studies, folk art, body art, dress and costume, and foodways. She has published her research on India, Brazil, the United States, and Sweden. Professor Shukla has lectured on material culture, dress, and adornment within the United States, and also in India, Bangladesh, Canada, Israel, and Estonia. In 2016, Shukla gave the Benjamin Botkin Folklife lecture at the American Folklife Center, The Library of Congress.

== Publications ==
Shukla’s first book, The Grace of Four Moons: Dress, Adornment, and the Art of the Body in Modern India, was published in 2008 and analyzes the everyday and special occasion dress of women in Banaras (Varanasi), India. The book investigates the male realms of production and commerce, and the female realm of creative adornment, in order to conceptualize a total model for the study of body art, traced in time and place, to achieve an artifactual life history. For this book, the Costume Society of America awarded her the 2009 Millia Davenport Publication Award, which is given to published works that make a significant contribution to the study of costume using appropriate methodology, original thought, and exceptional creativity. The book was also recognized by the South Asia Council of the Association of Asian Studies in 2010 with the A.K. Coomaraswamy Book Prize, which recognizes the best book written about India in English.

Her second book, The Individual and Tradition: Folkloristic Perspectives, was co-edited with Ray Cashman and Tom Mould, and published in 2011. The book features a collection of performer-centered case studies, advancing the methodological and theoretical issues entailed in ethnographic endeavor.

Shukla’s third book, Costume: Performing Identities through Dress, was published in 2015. This book presents a phenomenological overview of costume, with case studies on carnival costumes in Brazil; folk dress for Midsummer in Sweden; and costumes for historical reenactments and theatrical productions in the United States. Costume explores how individuals embrace and display special identities, unlike those they express through daily dress, showing how costume functions to reveal distinct identities in situations rich with significance.

Her fourth book, Sacred Art: Catholic Saints and Candomblé Gods in Modern Brazil was co-authored with Henry Glassie, and published in 2018. Through close study with artists in the states of Bahia and Pernambuco, the book explores personal creativity and collective religiosity within Catholic and African Candomblé contemporary imagery, in clay, wood, paper, and canvas.

=== Books ===
- Folk Art: Continuity, Creativity, and the Brazilian Quotidian (with Henry Glassie), 2023.
- Sacred Art: Catholic Saints and Candomblé Gods in Modern Brazil (with Henry Glassie), 2018.
- Costume: Performing Identities through Dress, 2015.
- The Individual and Tradition: Folkloristic Perspectives. (with Ray Cashman & Tom Mould), 2011.
- The Grace of Four Moons: Dress, Adornment, and the Art of the Body in Modern India, 2008.

=== Articles ===
- "The Future of Dress Scholarship: Sartorial Autobiographies and the Social History of Clothes." 2015.
- “Evaluating Saris: Social Tension and Aesthetic Complexity in the Textile of Modern India.” 2008.
- “An Introduction to the Study of Dress and Bodily Adornment.” 2006.
- “The Study of Dress and Adornment as Social Positioning.” 2005.

== Awards and distinctions ==
- Indiana University Trustees Teaching Award (2002)
- Indiana University Trustees Teaching Award (2007)
- Elli Köngäs-Maranda Prize Honorable Mention, Women’s Section, American Folklore Society, for The Grace of Four Moons (2008)
- Millia Davenport Publication Award of the Costume Society of America, for The Grace of Four Moons, awarded for "excellence in scholarship in the study of costume” (2009)
- Indiana University Trustees Teaching Award (2010)
- A.K. Coomaraswamy Book Prize by the South Asian Council of the Association for Asian Studies, for The Grace of Four Moons. Awarded to "the author of the best English-language work in South Asian studies" (2010)
- Indiana University Trustees Teaching Award (2016)
- President's Award for Distinguished Teaching (2018)
- Indiana University Graduate School Faculty Mentor Award (2020)
- Elected Fellow of the American Folklore Society (2020)
- The College of Arts and Sciences James P. Holland and Morley Distinguished Teaching Award (2025)
- Inducted into FACET: The Faculty Academy on Excellence in Teaching, a Presidential Initiative of Indiana University (2026)
