= Jang Bahadur Shukla =

Indian scientist (1937–2023)

- Born: 13 January 1937; Balrampur, Uttar Pradesh, India
- Died: 15 March 2023 (aged 86)
- Education: Lucknow University and Indian Institute of Technology, Kanpur
- Known for: Outstanding contribution in Mathematical Biology
- Awards: Shanti Swarup Bhatnagar Prize for Science and Technology
- Scientific career
- Fields: Mathematical modelling
- Workplaces: Indian Institute of Technology, Kanpur, LNM Institute of Information Technology, Jaipur and Bhabha International Institute of Fundamental Research and Development
- Doctoral advisor: Prof. J. N. Kapur

Jang Bahadur Shukla (13 January 1937 – 15 March 2023) was an Indian mathematician who specialised in mathematical modelling of ecological, environmental, physiological, and engineering systems.

He was awarded in 1982 the Shanti Swarup Bhatnagar Prize for Science and Technology, the highest science award in India, in the mathematical sciences category. Apart from this, he won various other prestigious awards including the FICCI Award, which is the highest national award by industry in physical sciences including mathematics, in 1980, and the Distinguished Service Award in Mathematical Sciences from Vijnana Parishad of India in 1997. Shukla had proposed a new deterministic theory regarding the effect of surface roughness in lubrication. He has done significant work on biofluid dynamics, in particular peristaltic transport of faeces in intestines and on interaction of biorheological aspects of blood flow and arterial stenosis. He has also made contributions in the area of population dynamics of interacting species and mathematical theory of epidemics by taking into account environmental effects. Shukla died on 15 March 2023, at the age of 86.
