= Vijai Shukla =

Indian-Danish food scientist

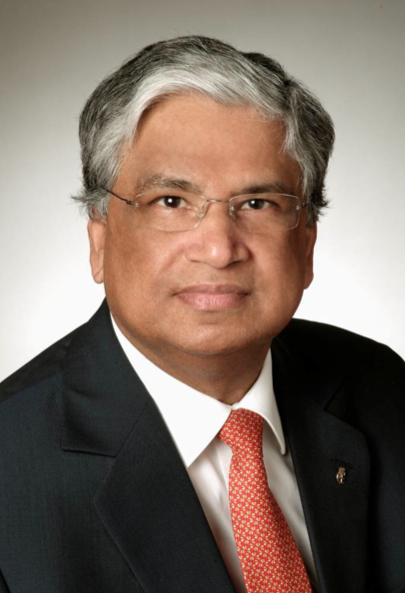
Photograph of Professor Dr. Vijai Shukla

Dr. Vijai Shukla (born 23 March 1948) is an Indian-Danish food scientist, researcher and professor in lipidology, and a central figure in the study of essential fatty acids. He is also the president of the International Food Science Center based in Denmark, Fellow of the American Oil Chemists' Society (AOCS) and adjunct professor to the Department of Food Science and Nutrition at University of Minnesota.

== Career ==
Shukla gained his master's degree in Organic Chemistry in 1969 from the University of Allahabad and his Ph.D. in 1973 from the same university. Subsequently, he received a post-doctoral UNESCO award and did work first at the Charles University in Prague and then in 1975 at the Institute of Neurochemistry in Experimental Life Sciences in Copenhagen, and at the Federal Centre for Lipid Research in Münster, Germany.

In 1979 he was appointed R&D manager by then Aarhus Oliefabrik (now AarhusKarlshamn), a leading company in the manufacture of vegetable oils and specialty fats. In 1990 he joined Karlshamn as Research Director, and started his own company in 1991, IFSC, of which he is still President. Shukla's research includes both the field of physical phenomena and the mechanisms of autoxidation, isolation of lipids, spectral phenomena related to lipids (e.g. pulsed Nuclear magnetic resonance), modern analytical methodology, and involvement of essential fatty acids in health and disease such as multiple sclerosis and Batten Disease where he has made significant scientific contributions.

Shukla has authored close to 120 peer-reviewed papers, reviews and book chapters, and 15 books. He was the Associate Editor for the peer-reviewed journal INFORM from 1989–97 and remains Associate Editor of the Journal of the American Oil Chemists Society and of Lipid Technology. In 1996 he received the American Oil Chemists' Society (AOCS) Herbert Dutton Award for "significant contributions to analytical methodologies" and was given the prestigious Stephen S. Chang Award in 2002 for "decisive accomplishments in research for the improvement or development of products related to lipids".

Shukla has, apart from his engagement in basic science, also focused continuously on the translation of knowledge gained into industrial applications and commercial enterprise. In 1996 he established a refinery in the Netherlands, and demonstrated that total oxidation can be arrested during processing, and resulting speciality fats of extremely fresh quality can be delivered to customers in the scale of 500-1000 tonnes per shipment. Another achievement is the encapsulation of high amounts of essential PUFA of fish or plant origin combined with natural antioxidant systems to be used as nutritional supplement and as additive in cosmetic formulations. In 2005 he was bestowed by the AOCS with the status of Fellow, awarded to members of the AOCS whose achievements in science entitle them to "exceptionally important recognition", and who have rendered “unusually important service to the society or to their profession".

Prior to his current position as adjunct professor to the Department of Food Science and Nutrition at the University of Minnesota, Dr. Shukla held the position as adjunct professor to the Department of Food Science and Human Nutrition of the University of Illinois at Urbana–Champaign for 10 years.

Recently, Shukla has developed a designer oil by the name of Nutridan, containing high amounts of essential polyunsaturated fatty acids. The oils used are of vegetable origin, and extracted by physical means. The oil is used both as a health supplement and in cooking, and is novel because of its solvent-free nature, not being derived from fish origin as many similar oils, and being high in natural antioxidants.

== Qualitree / Cosmeceuticals ==
Prof. Vijai Shukla and International Food Science Centre are active members of QualiTree, a research-based tree oil production in West Africa, that aims to reduce proverty by increasing food security and income in Burkina Faso and Mali, through sustainable growth and development of local industrial food production and marketing of oil products from native trees.

== Selected articles ==
Shukla, V. K. S.; Clausen, J.: Linoleate and fatty acids pattern of serum lipids in Multiple Sclerosis. Acta Neurol. Scand.. 57, 270, 1978.

Shukla, V. K. S.; Srivastava, K. C.: Erythrocyte glutathione peroxidase and serum lipid pattern: A comparison between Indian immigrants and Danes. Z. Ernarungswissenschaft, 17, 240, 1978.

Shukla, V. K. S.; Spener, F.: High performance liquid chromatography of triglycerides of Flacourtiaceae seed oils containing cyclopentenyl fatty acids (chaulmoogric oils). J. Chromatog. 348, 441, 1985.

Shukla, V. K. S.: Application of high performance liquid chromatography for evaluation of lipid structures. J. Dispersion Science and Technology, 10, 581, 1989.

Shukla, V. K. S.; Perkins, E. G.: The presence of oxidative polymeric materials in encapsulated fish oils. Lipids. Vol. 26, No. 1, 1991. MSK Syed Rahmatullah, Shukla, V. K. S., Mukherjee, K.D.: Enrichment of ␣-Linolenic Acid from Evening Primrose Oil and Borage Oil via Lipase-Catalyzed Hydrolysis. JAOCS. Vol. 71, no. 6 (June 1994).

"The Role of Dietary Fats and Oils". Fats, Oleochemicals and Surfactants. Challenges in the 21st Century. V.V.S. Mani and A.D. Shitole. Oxford & IBH Publishing Co. PVT. Ltd. OTAI, 1997.

Shukla, V. K. S.: "Chocolate – The Chemistry of Pleasure". INFORM, Vol. 8, no. 2 (February 1997).

Shukla, V. K. S.; Kragballe, K: Exotic Butters and Cosmetic Lipids. INFORM, Vol. 9, no. 5 (May 1998).

Shukla, V. K. S.; Bhattacharya, K.: Mango Butter in Cosmetic Formulations. Cosmetic & Toiletries, Vol. 117, no. 6 (June 2002)

Shukla, V. K. S.: A designer oil for better health. INFORM, Vol. No. 14 (June 2003).

Shukla, V. K. S.; Bhattacharya, K.: Extending the shelf life of cosmetic products through novel stabilisation of exotic butters and oils, SÖFW-Journal Seifen, Öle, Fette, Wachse, 129, Jahrgang 9- 2003.

Shukla, V. K. S.; Bhattacharya, K.: the Magic of Rosemary. Oils & Fats International, January 2004

Shukla V. K. S.: Designing natural cosmetics through the dynamics of naturally derived lipids. INFORM, Vol. 15, no. 4 (April 2004)

Shukla V. K. S.; Bhattacharya K.: Enhancing the Stability of Natural Oils and Butters with Rosemary Extracts. Cosmetic & Toiletries, Vol. 119, no. 5 (May 2004).

Shukla V. K. S.: The Challenges of Skin Care. INFORM, Vol. 15 no. 5 (May 2004)

Shukla V. K. S.: New Horizons in the Development of Natural Oils and Butters as Cosmetic Ingredients. Cosmetic Science Technology (2005)

Shukla V. K. S.: Innovative Organic Lipids in Filtering the Chemistry in Cosmeceuticals. Cosmetic Science Technology (2009)

Shukla, V. K. S., Le Poole, Hendrik A.C.: Review of Some Unconventional Tree Seed Oils from Africa for Application in Cosmetics, Cosmetic Science Technology (2010)

Shukla, V. K. S.; Nielsen, S.: Novel Introduction of Spice and Fruit Butters and Oils in Cosmetic Applications. Cosmetic Science Technology (2012)

Shukla V. K. S.; Nielsen, S.: Enhancing the Value of Cosmeceuticals Through Internally Stabilised Spice Formulations. Cosmetic Science Technology (2013)

Shukla V. K. S.; Nielsen, S.: Studies in the Evaluation of Unconvenional Oils from Burkina Faso - Part One: Rich in Oleic Acid (C18:1 n-9). Cosmetic Science Technology (2014)
