= The Descent of Air India =

2013 book by Jitender Bhargava

- Author: Jitender Bhargava
- Language: English
- Genre: Non-fiction
- Published: 2013 (Bloomsbury Publishing)/ 2014 (Amazon India)
- Publication place: India
- Media type: Print/E-book
- Pages: 290pp (Kindle edition)

The Descent of Air India is a book by Jitender Bhargava, a former executive director of Air India. The book chronicles the financial downfall of the public sector airline. The book was withdrawn after a defamation suit was filed by former Aviation Minister Praful Patel. The book is now available as an ebook on Amazon Kindle Store. Hard copies are also available on Amazon India since January 2016 after the author self-published the book.

== Overview ==
In the book, Bhargava argues that the public sector airline Air India reached a bad state, due to government interference and bad decisions. He also writes about the servile attitude of Air India towards minister Patel. He also points out other reasons of its downfall, which include bilateral agreements which were unprofitable, cancellation of flights on profitable routes or giving them to other airlines, and acquisitions of planes at high prices and selling them at very low prices.

The book claims that the deals to buy 111 planes from Boeing and Airbus in 2005-2006, along with the merger of Air India with the public sector domestic airline Indian Airlines led to its downfall. The book places the responsibility on Praful Patel and V. Thulasidas, former Air India chairman. The book notes that not much thought was given to how the debt from the acquisitions will be serviced. It also says that Praful Patel was aware of Air India's shrinking marketing and yet was giving bilateral rights to foreign airlines. The book points out the frequent changes in the management of the company.

== Lawsuit and withdrawal ==
The book was originally released on 11 October 2013. In November 2013, lawyer Satish Maneshinde filed a criminal defamation lawsuit in Mumbai metropolitan court, on behalf of Praful Patel.

The publishers Bloomsbury settled in an out of court agreement in January 2014. They withdrew the book and agreed to pulp all remaining books in their stock. They also issued a public apology to Praful Patel. Maneshinde told the newspaper DNA India that no pressure was put on the publishers to withdraw the book, but it was the result of the settlement. Patel also denied pressuring the publishers, but added that he was forced to seek legal recourse as the allegation against him in the book were baseless.

Bhargava claimed that the book was based on existing documents. He added that the decision to withdraw was carried out unilaterally by the publishers and he was not consulted. Later, he released the book as an ebook on Amazon Kindle on 12 March 2014 and hard copies of the book were self-published in January 2016. Copies are available on Amazon India.

The defamation case filed by Praful Patel was withdrawn in February 2017 from the Metropolitan Court.
