= Rajesh Shukla (statistician) =

Indian researcher and author (born 1965)

- Born: 1 August 1965
- Education: Indian Agriculture Research Institute, Narendra Deva University of Agriculture and Technology

Rajesh Shukla (born 1 August 1965) is an Indian researcher, author and applied statistician. His major area of work is the Indian Consumer landscape and citizens’ environment. Shukla has served as the Director for NCAER-Centre for Macro Consumer Research and is a visiting professor at Institute for Human Development (IHD), India. He is currently serving as the Managing Director & CEO of People Research on India's consumer economy (PRICE, branded as ICE 360^{0}), an independent not-for-profit ‘think-tank’ cum ‘fact-tank’, engaged in identifying data gaps, collecting, building and disseminating seminal knowledge and insights into India's Citizens’ Environment and Consumer Economy.

== Academic career ==
He received his MSc (1989) and PhD (1993) in Agricultural Statistics from Indian Agriculture Statistics Research Institute (IASRI), India and BSc (1985) in Agriculture from N.D. University of Agriculture & Technology (NDUAT), India.

In 1993, he has started his career as survey statistician at National Council of Applied Economic Research (NCAER), the India's oldest and largest independent economic think tank, reached highest level in research ladder as the Senior Fellow (NCAER) in 2004 and became the Director of NCAER-CMCR.

Shukla has created Pan India primary baseline databases on issues of national importance, analytic constructs, and actionable insights relating to household well-being; income distribution and inequality; regional disparity; Rural & Urban well-being; Financial Inclusion; Indian Middle Class, Tourism; Science and Technology; Public Understanding of Science; Indian Youth; Caste and Energy.

== Key publications ==
=== Books/Reports ===
- Martin W Bauer, Petra Pansegrau and Rajesh Shukla (2018) "The Cultural Authority of Science Comparing across Europe, Asia, Africa and the Americas", 1st Edition, Routledge, U.K. ISBN 9781138059924, ISBN 9781315163284
- Rajesh Shukla (2018). "Indian Citizens' Basic Needs: A Progress Report”. PRICE, New Delhi
- Rajesh Shukla (Principal Investigator) (2018) "Mapping the Merchant's Mind: An Analysis of Digital Payment Behaviours by Fixed Store Merchants in Jaipur”, CATALYST, PRICE, New Delhi.
- Martin W. Bauer, Rajesh Shukla], Nick Allum (2011) "The Culture of Science: How the Public Relates to Science Across the Globe”, Routledge, U.K. ISBN 978-0415873697, ISBN 9780415851022, ISBN 9780203813621
- Rajesh Shukla, P.K. Ghosh and Rachna Sharma (2011) "Assessing the Effectiveness of Small Borrowing in India", NCAER, New Delhi. ISBN 8185877726, ISBN 978-8185877723.
- Rajesh Shukla (2010) "How India Earns, Spends and Saves: Unmasking the real India”, NCAER and SAGE, New Delhi. ISBN 978-8132104766
- Rajesh Shukla, Sunil Jain and Preeti Kakkar (2010) "Caste in a Different Mould: Understanding the Discrimination”, Business Standard and NCAER, New Delhi. ISBN 9788190573597
- Rajesh Shukla (2010) "Indian Youth: Demographics and Readership”, National Book Trust and NCAER, New Delhi.
- Rajesh Shukla (Team Leader, 2010). "Handloom Census of India 2009–10", NCAER, New Delhi. ISBN 81-88830-14-3.
- Rajesh Shukla and Roopa Purushothaman (2008) "The Next Urban Frontier: Twenty Cities to Watch, NCAER, New Delhi and Future Research Capital, Mumbai. ISBN 81-88830-10-0
- Rajesh Shukla (2005) "India Science Report", NCAER and Indian National Science Academy, New Delhi. ISBN 8188830070.
- Rajesh Shukla (2005) "The Great Indian Market: Results from the NCAER Market Information Survey of Households”, NCAER and Business Standard, New Delhi. ISBN 8188830089
- Rajesh Shukla (2004) "The Great Indian Middle Class: Results from the NCAER Market Information Survey of Households”, NCAER and Business Standard, New Delhi. ISBN 8188830046
- Rajesh Shukla (2001). People Perception towards Science & Technology, NCAER, New Delhi. ISBN 8185877726
- Rajesh Shukla and S.D. Brahmankar (1999). Impact Evaluation of Operation Flood on Rural Dairy Sector, NCAER, New Delhi. ISBN 8185877491

=== Research articles ===
- Rajesh Shukla (2018). "The great Indian middle class: a force to reckon”, Gold 2048: The next 30 years for gold, World Gold Council, UK; 14.
- Rama Bijapurkar, Rajesh Shukla and Mridusmita Bordoloi (2014). "Reasons and Attitudes Toward Using Cash in India." IBGC Working Paper 14-03.
- Rajesh Shukla (2010) "The Official Poor in India, Summed Up", Indian Journal of Human Development, 4 (2), 301–328.
- Rajesh Shukla, Ishan Bakshi and Palash Baruah (2010) "Trends in Poverty and Inequality: An Analysis of the High Growth Period”, Indian Journal of Human Development, 5 (2), 345–364.
- Rajesh Shukla, Anil Rai and Nitasha Monga (2010) "India Protection Index: An Objective Measurement of Economic and Social Well Being of Indian Population”, Margin, The Journal of Applied Economic Research, 4 (3), 339–367.
- Rajesh Shukla and Martin Bauer (2009) "Construction and Validation of ‘Science Culture Index’: Results from Comparative Analysis of Engagement, Knowledge and Attitudes to Science: India and Europe”, Working Paper (WP 100), NCAER, New Delhi.
- Rajesh Shukla (2007) "Use Pattern of Human Resources in Science and Technology in India, Margin: The Journal of Applied Economic Research, Vol. 1, No. 2, 215–230.
- Rajesh Shukla and Monga, Nitasha (2006) "An Exploration of Leisure and Holidays", Margin, 38/2, pp 37–46.
- Rajesh Shukla and Preeti Kakar (2006) "Role of Science & Technology, Higher Education and Research in Regional Socio-Economic Development", Working paper (WP98), NCAER, New Delhi.
- Rajesh Shukla (2005) "NCAER's Market Information of Households: Statistical Properties and Applications for Policy Analysis”, “The Great Indian Poverty Debate”, pages: 484–493.
- Suman Bery and Rajesh Shukla ( 25–31 Jan. 2003) “NCAER's Market Information Survey of Households: Statistical Properties and Applications for Policy Analysis, Economic and Political Weekly, Vol. 38, No. 4, pp. 350–354.
- Pradeep Srivastava and Shukla R.K. (2003). Estimating Domestic Tourism Expenditure in Developing Economies: Lesson from India. Tourism Satellite Accounts (TSA), Implementation Project, Enzo Paci Papers on Measuring the Economic Significance of Tourism, Vol 3, World Tourism Organisation, Madrid, Spain.
