= Ram Chandra Shukla =

Indian painter and art critic (1925–2016)

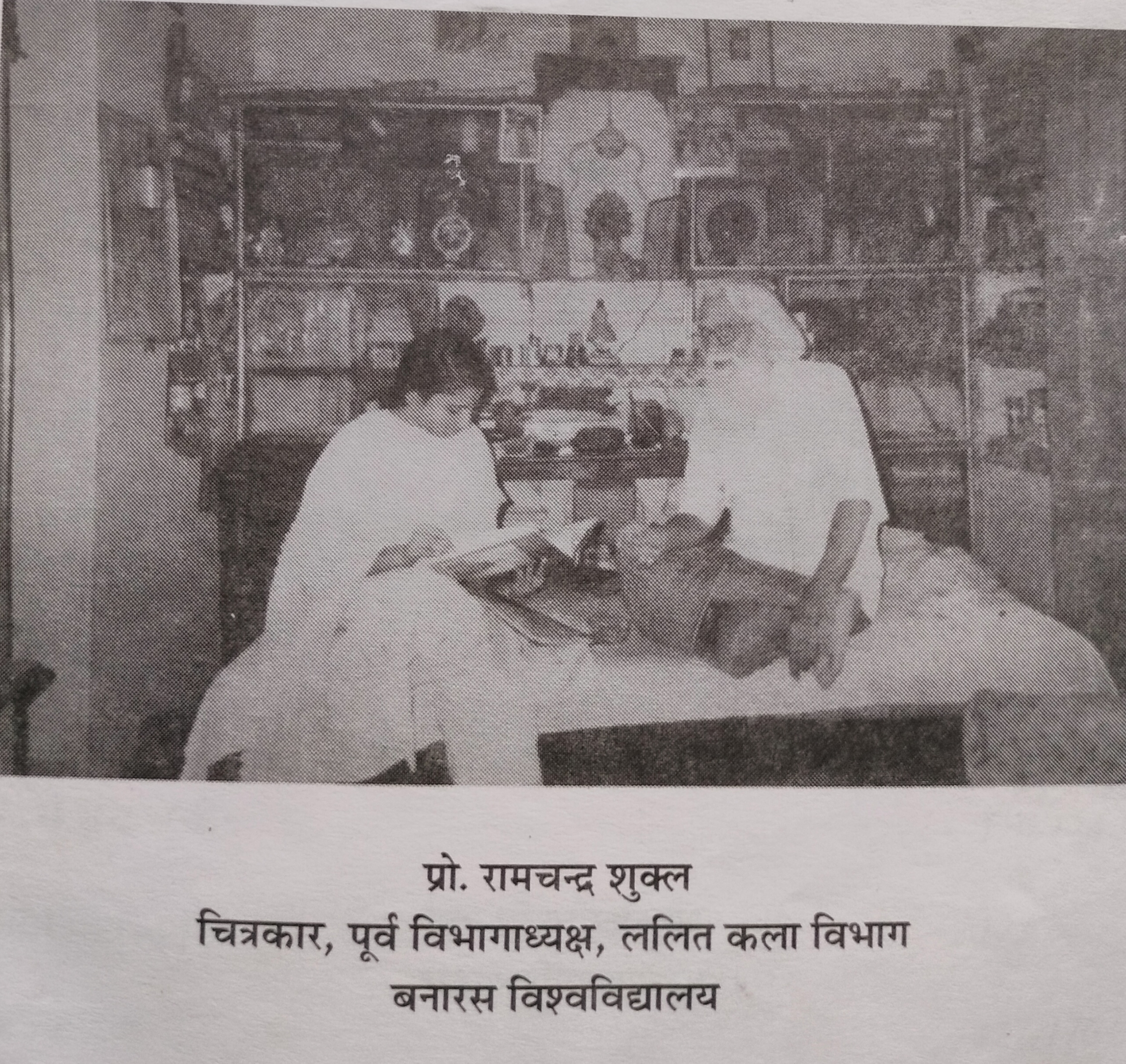
- Prof. Ram Chandra Shukla Interviewed by Dr. Archana Dwivedi
- Born: 1925; Basti, United Provinces, British India
- Died: 3 September 2016 (aged 90–91); Allahabad, Uttar Pradesh, India
- Known for: Painting
- Website: www.ramchandrashukla.com

Ram Chandra Shukla (1925–2016) was an Indian painter and art critic.

== Early life ==
Shukla was born in Shukulpura, a small village in Basti district, Uttar Pradesh, into a farmer’s family. His family later moved to Allahabad, a prominent cultural city in Uttar Pradesh, where he was raised.

He completed his graduation at Allahabad University and trained in painting under Kshitindra Nath Majumdar, a noted Indian artist of the Bengal School. Shukla has been recognized as a "Proud Past Alumni" by the Allahabad University Alumni Association.

== Career ==
Shukla joined Banaras Hindu University as a teacher of art in the Department of Painting. He retired as a professor and the Head of Department of Painting of Banaras Hindu University in the year 1985.

Subsequently, he shifted to his native place, Allahabad, and started his studio there. Shukla does not try to sell his paintings; he simply wants to go in the depth of art itself and work as a spiritual painter, enjoying the bliss of art. He is known for his experiment with brush and colours. He developed various indigenous style of painting of which most important are Kashi Shailee, Samikshavad and intuitive paintings.

=== Kashi Shailee paintings ===
Shukla used to paint in the water color wash technique prevalent at the time. Thereafter, he began to take interest in the folk paintings of India, particularly Benaras folk art and miniature paintings of India. It was during that period that he with other drawing students developed a new school of Indian contemporary painting called Kashi Shailee, based on folk art and miniature paintings.

=== Samikshavad ===
Shukla painted many forms and styles of paintings, but he was in search of an indigenous style of modern painting in India, which he developed during his stay in Benaras Hindu University in the year 1974, called Samikshavad. This style is now well known in India. By this style, the artist tends to expose the corruption prevalent in the society and politics, with a language that is symbolic and satirical.

=== Intuitive paintings ===
Shukla's latest experiment (in 2005) has taken a different turn and he now calls his recent paintings intuitive paintings which express his inner spiritual feelings and experiences. These paintings have been made in the new medium of coloured markers and sketch pens. They are small paintings and can be called modern miniature paintings.

== Personal life ==
Shukla lived in Allahabad, Uttar Pradesh, India, with his wife, Kala Rani Shukla and his children and grandchildren. He was the father of five sons and two daughters. His work is displayed at his paternal house in Allahabad which is now converted in a museum as R.C.Shukla Research Center for Visual Science and Arts.

== Books by Shukla ==
- Rekhawali (in Hindi), published by Kala Prakashan, Allahabad, 1951.
- Kala Aur Aadhunik Pravityan (Art and Modern Trends) (in Hindi), published by Hindi Samiti, Govt. of Uttar Pradesh, India, II Edition 1963.
- Naveen Bhartiya Kala Shikshan Padhatti (Modern Indian Methods of Art Teaching) (in Hindi), published by Kitab Mahal, Allahabad, India, 1958.
- Chitrakala ka Rasaswadan (Appreciation of Painting) (in Hindi), published by Hindi Pracharak Pusakalaya, Varanasi, India, 1962.
- Kala Ka Darshan (Philosophy of Art) (in Hindi), published by Karona Art Publisher, Meerut, India, 1964.
- Kala Prasang (Great References of Art) (in Hindi), published by Karona Art Publisher, Meerut, India, 1965.
- Aadhunik Kala-Samikshavad (Modern Art and Indian Movement of Art Samikshavad) (in Hindi), published by Kala Prakashan, Allahabad, India, 1994.
- Aadhunik Chitrakala (Modern Painting) (in Hindi), published by Sahitya Sangam, Allahabad, India, 2006.
- Paschhimi Aadhunik Chitrakar (Modern Western Painters) (in Hindi), published by Sahitya Sangam, Allahabad, India, 2006.
- Shilp-Lok (World of Creation) (in Hindi), published by Kitab Ghar, Patna, India, 1953.

== Research on Ram Chandra Shukla ==
- "Uttar Pradesh ki Samkalin Kala mein Samikshavad aur Prof. Ram Chandra Shukla" (Samikshavad and Prof.Ram Chandra Shukla in contemporary Art of Uttar Pradesh) (in Hindi) - doctoral dissertation by Anju Kanaujia, CSJM University, Kanpur, India, 2001
- "Prof Ram Chandra Shukla – Vyaktitva evam Krititva" (Prof. Ram Chandra Shukla – Personality and Paintings) (in Hindi) – dissertation by I.C. Gupta, Banaras Hindu University, Varanasi, India, 1998.
- "Prasiddha Chitrakar, Lekhak, Samikshak ki Kalatmak Jeevan Yatra – Prof Ram Chandra Shukla" (The Artistic Life Journey of a Famous Artist Writer and Critic – Prof. Ram Chandra Shukla) (in Hindi) – dissertation by Gargi Upadhyay, DDU Gorakhpur University, Gorakhpur, India, 2006.
- "Kala Bhushan Prof. Ram Chandra Shukla: Krititva Aur Vyaktitva – Ek Samikshatmak Addhyan" (Kala Bhushan Prof. Ram Chandra Shukla: Personality and Work – A Critical Study) (in Hindi) – doctoral dissertation by Rakesh Kumar Singh, CCS University, Meerut, India, 2001.
- "Samikshavad Ka Vaicharik, Tatvik avum Samajik Addhayan Professor Ram Chandra Shukla Ki Kala Ke Sandarbha Mein" (Thoughtful, Materialistic and Socialistic Study of Samikshavad in Context of Art of Prof.Ram Chandra Shukla) (in Hindi)- doctoral dissertation by Kanchan Sinha, Allahabad University.

== Other references ==
- Samkalin Bhartiya Kala (Contemporary Indian Art) (in Hindi) by Ram Viranjan, published by Nirmal Book Agency, Kurukshetra, India, 2003.
- Banaras ki Chitrakala (Paintings of Banaras) (in Hindi) by Dr. H.N. Misra, published by Kala Prakashan, Varanasi, India, 2002.
- Bharatiya Chitrakala – Parampara aur Aadhunikta ka Antradwand (Indian Paintings – Conflict of Tradition and Modernity) (in Hindi) by Dr. S.B.L. Saxena and Dr. Anand Lakhtakiya, published by Saran Prakashan, Bareili, India, 2004.
- Allahabad ke Chitrakar (Painters of Allahabad) (in Hindi) by Laxmikant Verma, published by Allahabad Sangrahalaya, Allahabad, India, 2000.
- Chitrakala Mein Naya Andolan Samikshavad (A New Movement in Painting: Samikhavad) (in Hindi), by Anurag Chaturvedi, Dharmyug 22 February 1981.
- Bharatma kala Andolan Samikshavad (Indian Art Movement Samikhavad) (in Hindi), by Surendraraj Bhattarai, Kalakkriti Kathmandu in Nepal.
- "Artists must look beyond politics", Hindustan Times, New Delhi, 16-1-79.
- "Paintings with purpose", Evening News, Delhi, 19-1-79.
- "Bid to point social criticism", Hindustan Times, New Delhi, 22-1-79.
- Varanasi (Samikshavad) Cultural News From India, New Delhi, Volume XX, Number 3, 1979.
- The Allahabad Idea of Art, Northern India Patrika, Allahabad, 25, 3, 1987.

== Awards and fellowships ==
- Fellowship State Lalit Kala Akademi, U.P.
- Kala Bhushan, Hindi Sansthan, U.P.; Joe Fregonard, France; Veteran Artist, AIFACS, New Delhi.
