= Avay Shukla =

Indian Administrative Service officer

Avay Shukla is a retired officer of the Indian Administrative Service (IAS), an environmentalist, and a writer.

== Biography ==
Shukla obtained his Master's degree (English) from Hindu College, Delhi, in 1973. He taught for two years at Delhi University, before joining the Indian Administrative Service in 1975. He served in Delhi and the Indian Himalayan state of Himachal Pradesh in various capacities. Shukla retired from the IAS in December 2010, completing his official duties as the Additional Chief Secretary of Himachal Pradesh.

Shukla is the President of the Himachal Pradesh Trekking Association, and is one of the founding members of the Eco-Tourism Society of India.

Shukla has settled in a village, Puranikoti, above Shimla and divides his time between that and Delhi. He has two sons, Sidharth (a digital media executive with a multi-national company) and Saurabh (a finance and investment consultant) with his wife Neerja, a special educator who manages her own NGO working with children who are mentally and physically challenged.

== Bibliography ==
Avay Shukla writes extensively on current affairs, the environment and conservation, the bureaucracy and governance, legal matters, social issues, societal peccadilloes and more. His work has been published in The New Indian Express, The Times of India, The Hindustan Times, The Tribune, National Herald, The Morning Standard and on websites such as Sify.com, The Wire, The Citizen and Hillpost.com.

=== Books ===
- The Trails Less Travelled: Trekking the Himachal Himalayas
- The Spectre of Choor Dhar: Tales from the Mountains
- PolyTicks, DeMocKrazy & MumboJumbo: Babus, Mantris and Netas (Un)Making Our Nation
- India: The Wasted Years
