= Dammur =

- Town
- Country: India
- State: Karnataka
- District: Bellary

Languages
  - Official: Kannada
- Time zone: UTC+5:30 (IST)
- ISO 3166 code: IN-KA
- Vehicle registration: KA
- Nearest city: Bellary, Hampi
- Website: karnataka.gov.in

Dammur is a town in Northern Karnataka, India. It is few hours from North of Bangalore city in Midwest/Central region of India. It is located near Hampi known for rich history, Heritage, Oldest temples and Ancient architecture in India dating back to 1CE. Hampi is the most historic visited place in the world.

== See also ==
- Hampi
- Bellary
- Bangalore
- Karnataka
