= Siege of Udayagiri =

- Part of Deccani–Vijayanagar wars
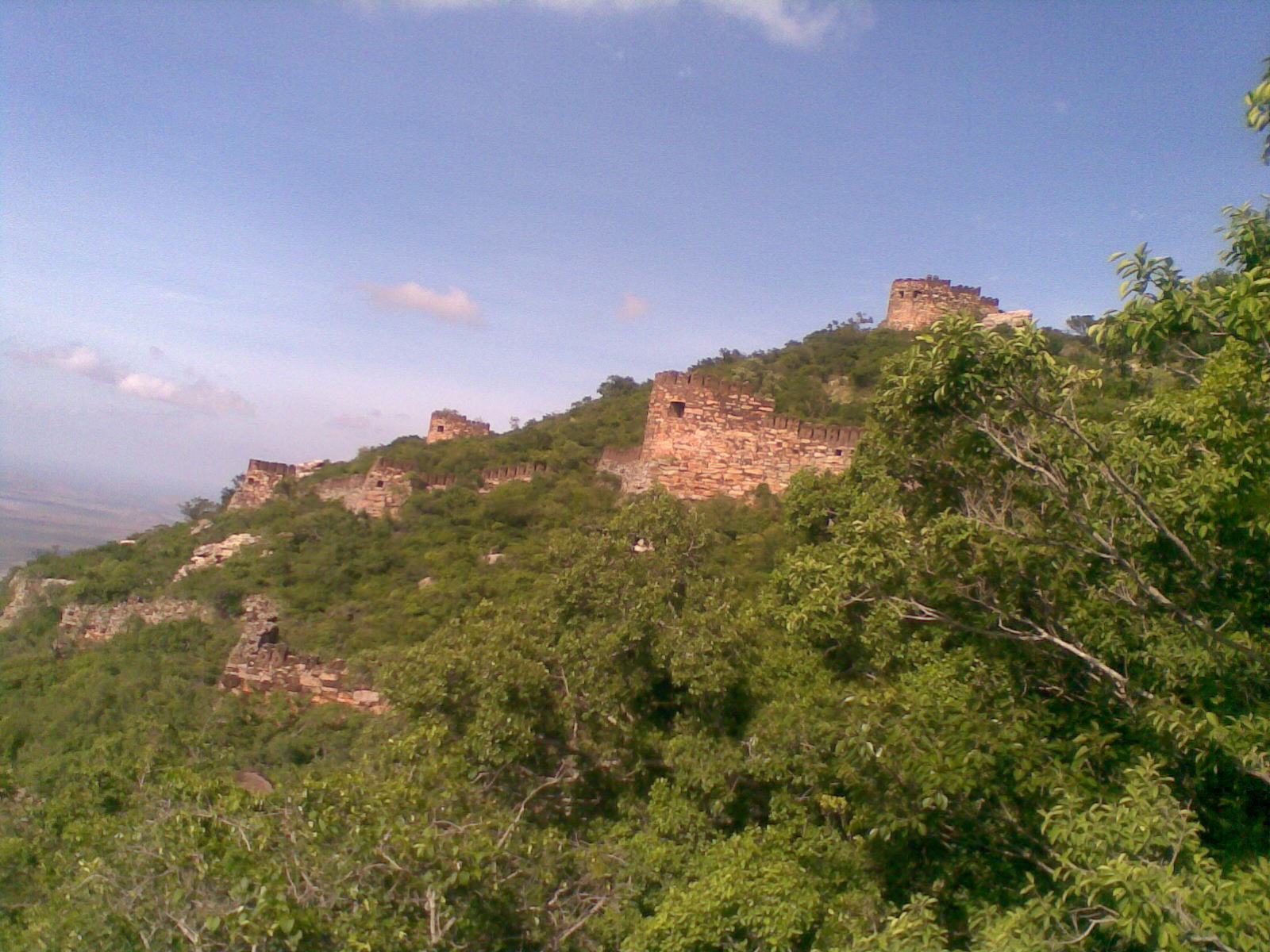
- Udayagiri Fort
Date	April, 1643 – January, 1644
Location	Udayagiri, Andhra Pradesh, India
Result	Vijayanagar victory
Territorial changes	Udayagiri Remained under Vijayanagara control

Belligerents
Vijayanagar Empire; Supported by: Bijapur Sultanate	Golconda Sultanate

Commanders and leaders
Sriranga III	Mir Jumla II

Strength
20,000 Infantry; 6,000 Cavalry	Unknown

The Siege of Udayagiri was a military conflict between the Vijayanagara Empire under Sriranga III and the Golconda Sultanate. After advancing into Vijayanagara territory, the Golconda army captured several areas and laid siege to the strong fortress of Udayagiri. Sriranga III was initially unable to help the fort because of internal rebellions from the Nayaks of Gingee and Kalahasti and a lack of military support. after securing aid from the Sultan of Bijapur he launched a counteroffensive with a large army. In January 1644, Sriranga successfully drove the Golconda Army from Udayagiri.

== Background ==
Soon after his coronation on 29 October 1642, Sriranga III had to deal with a major invasion from the Golconda Sultanate. In April 1643, he marched to Tirupati and fortified his position there to stop the enemy advance. Although he had a sizeable army, the Golconda forces were better armed and the loyalty of some of his nobles was doubtful. Unwilling to risk a battle under such conditions, Sriranga III abandoned his camp and withdrew towards Narayanavaram and later Vellore. The Golconda Army chose not to pursue him. Instead, it turned towards Udayagiri one of the strongest forts in the region, and laid siege to it.

== Siege ==
=== Treachery of Venkatapati Nayaka ===
Sriranga III was unable to send help to the defenders of Udayagiri because he was facing problems within his own kingdom. One of his most troublesome nobles was Damerla Venkatapati Nayaka of Kalahasti who had opposed him since he became king. In March 1643, while Sriranga was camped at Tirupati preparing to resist the Golconda invasion Venkatapati Nayaka secretly supported the enemy. His betrayal was eventually uncovered and he was arrested and imprisoned. However despite the seriousness of his actions, Sriranga III did not impose a harsh punishment on him.

Sriranga III spared Venkatapati Nayaka's life and only took away some of his lands and property. However, Venkatapati Nayaka did not appreciate this mercy. A few months later he joined Krishnappa Nayak of Gingee and rebelled against Sriranga III.

=== Alliance With Bijapur ===
At that time, the Bijapur Sultanate was busy dealing with problems in Ikkeri and could not give much attention to Carnatic. As a result, Sriranga III was left without any strong allies. Surrounded by enemies both open and secret he was eventually defeated in battle and lost a large part of his territory. However, Bijapur Sultanate was not willing to let most of Carnatic fall under the control of Golconda Sultanate as this would have greatly increased Golconda's power in the region.

Seeing an opportunity to regain his lost position Sriranga III sought help from the Sultan of Bijapur. He sent fifteen elephants as a gift and promised to pay fifteen lakh pagodas in return for military assistance. In June 1643, the Sultan provided him with a force of six thousand cavalry and twenty thousand infantry. With this support Sriranga III marched against Udayagiri and launched a campaign to drive out the Golconda Army. he successfully recaptured the fort in January 1644 and temporarily halted Golconda's advance into his territories.

== Aftermath ==
After defeating the Golconda army Sriranga III regained his position and decided to assert his authority over the powerful Nayaks of Gingee, Tanjore and Madurai. He reminded them that they were still formally his vassals and expected to remain loyal to the Vijayanagara throne. Using his strengthened position he collected large payments from these rulers. Part of this money was then used to repay the Sultan of Bijapur whose military support had helped Sriranga III recover Udayagiri.

== See also ==
- Venkatapati Raya
- Dutch Coromandel
- Mughal Empire
