= Siege of Pulicat =

- Part of Colonial Conflicts In India
Date	12 August 1645 – January 1646
Location	Pulicat, Tamil Nadu, India 13.4177°N 80.3185°E
Result	Dutch victory

Belligerents
Vijayanagara Empire; Supported by: East India Company	Dutch Republic

Commanders and leaders
Sriranga III; Mallai Chetty; Henry Greenhill	Unknown

Strength
4,000	Unknown
- Location within South Asia

The Siege of Pulicat (1645–1646) was a military conflict fought between the Vijayanagara Empire under Sriranga III and the Dutch held town of Pulicat on the Coromandel Coast. The siege began in August 1645 as the Raya attempted to bring the important port under his control. The siege continued for several months but was interrupted by the invasion of Golconda Army under Mir Jumla II and internal rebellions among the Raya's vassals. The siege was abandoned without the capture of Pulicat.

== Background ==
A year after the defeat of Golconda army were defeated at Pulicat relations between the Dutch and Mallai Chetty, the local agent of Emperor Sriranga III broke down. According to Ivie, Mallai who represented the king in the region quarrelled with the Dutch despite having previously worked closely with them. He then captured a Dutch merchant near Tiruvottiyur close to Madras. When the Dutch sent a military force from Pulicat to rescue the merchant Mallai's troops defeated them.

In a letter dated 8 September 1645, the English officials at Madras wrote to the company headquarters in Surat:-

"Wee have formerly advised you of the great difference betwixt the Dutch and Molay, which now is fallen into open warrs. Soe that it is come to such a passe through Molayes meanes, who is in such favour with the King that he ruleth both King and Contry, and hath prevaled soe farr with the King to send his Mandates to all his Governours throughout his kingdome to seaze upon all the goods which is in any Jentue Marchants hands belonginge unto the Dutch, and whosoever shalbe found to deny any of their goods, that party to be seazed upon and all his estate forfitted unto the Kinge. And most parte of the said goods are allready gott together by the Kings officers to a greatt Towne 4 some t[w]elve miles from our Fort, where all the other goods must be brought, and there sould by the Kings Bramine and officer-; to those Marchants that hath mony to buy them. Soe that what goods is already sould is Bought by our Marchants which are indebted unto our Company, which they have brought into our fort for parte satisfaction of their debts.

' We must beseech you and the President of Bantam to provide us with shippinge and monyes for the mainteininge of our Creditte, which now lyeth att stake with our Merchants ; for, if we now fayle them, they wilbe utterly disparaged and we shamfully disgraced, even to the Losse of the Companies trade in this King's dominions, which is preferred wholly to us, and that the Dutch shall never trade here againe. and we are Confident that our Merchants will not fayle us in what they promise, in reguard the Cheife of them 1 is Molay his bosome freind, whome he endeavoreth to make sole Marchant in this King's Dominions, as himselfe was in a Manner when he was with the Dutch."

Sriranga III was now supporting Mallai in his conflict with the Dutch and had enough troops to continue the siege of Pulicat. Mallai enjoyed such great influence at court that some observers claimed he "ruled both the king and the country.

The English sought to take advantage of the situation. They bought large quantities of chintz and other cloth that Mallai had seized from the Dutch purchasing them at reduced prices. At the same time they requested additional ships and funds to strengthen their trading position. They were optimistic that, with the assistance of their chief merchant Seshadri Chetty who was a close friend of Mallai Chetty and hoped to become the leading merchant in the Raya's territories they would soon be able to weaken and perhaps even ruin the trade of their Dutch rivals.

The Dutch at Pulicat argued that Mallai had no authority to seize their goods and claimed that the English were knowingly buying property that had been unlawfully taken from them. They warned that they would search English ships and recover any Dutch goods found on board.

In response, Agent Ivie and the English officials at Madras decided to appeal to the now-friendly Sriranga III. They hoped the Raya would officially declare that Mallai had acted legally and under royal orders when he seized the Dutch goods.

The English also considered it wise to obtain a fresh confirmation of the trading privileges that had previously been granted to them by the Damarla brothers and by the Raya's predecessor. they sent Henry Greenhill to Vellore where Sriranga III was then residing. His mission was to secure a renewal of the rights originally granted to Mr. Cogan by the Great Nayak under whose protection the English had first settled. As the English explained the king had now taken control of the Nayak's territories and authority making the Nayak's former protection no longer effective.

=== Sriranga seeks English assistance in the conflict ===
The English reported that Sriranga III's authority was stronger than it had been for many years. According to their letter he had successfully brought all the major nobles under his control, something that had not been achieved for nearly forty years.

The English believed that Mallai's actions were lawful because he was acting under the Raya's authority and they therefore considered his campaign against the Dutch to be legitimate. before the English factors had sent their letter explaining this position, Sriranga III had already written to them. In his letter, he asked the English to assist in the operations against Pulicat and to purchase the goods that his forces had seized from the Dutch. He also welcomed their plan to send Henry Greenhill as an envoy to his court.

The Sriranga Raya's letter which was translated from Telugu into English and forwarded by the Madras factors to their superiors was titled "The King of Bisnagar's Letter to the Agent at Madraspatam" and dated to 25 September 1645 began as follows:-

"Zree Seringo Raylo, King of Kings, also in his kingdome, in Armes invincible, etc., unto the Captain of the English these: The Hollanders, who have their residence in Pulicat not valuing my letters, hath constrained mee to commence a war against them, the charge whereof is committed unto Chenana Chetty (Mallai) whom you are to assist therein with artillery, powder, shot, fireworks, and in so doing you shall pleasure us. Whatever goods appertained unto the Hollanders in my kingdom, I account it as my peculiar and proper wealth ; which being all come to Madrasapatam, we will that you buy and pay monies for the same, proceeding therein as Chenana Chetty (Mallai) and Seradra (Seshadri Chetty), shall prescribe, not failing at all in its performance. And whereas I am given to understand by Chenana Chetty that you intend to send up a man of quality into us, am very well pleased, for that you have always esteemed by ordinances and as Chenana Chetty will advise, so shall you be sure to receive content, nor be you induced to believe the contrary, but confide upon our word and hast to visit us by your second and whomsoever else you send along with him for whose secure repair unto our court this our Farman shall suffice. As for other matters Chenana Chetty will advise you."

=== Visit of Henry Greenhill to the court of vellore ===
Henry Greenhill visited Sriranga Raya, either at Vellore or Chandragiri, and obtained a cowle (a grant or official permit) confirming the English possession of Madras.

A letter sent by the English factors to Surat on 21 January 1646 reports that Greenhill had returned from the Raya's court after successfully completing his mission. He not only secured confirmation of the privileges that the English already enjoyed but also obtained several additional rights.

Today, three contemporary copies of this cowle survive. The first of these is believed to be the original document enclosed with the letter mentioned above. This cowle is especially important because it was the first royal grant issued directly by Sriranga Raya to the English for their occupation and administration of Madras. It reads as follows:-

“In the year Parthiwa, the month Kartika, the Moon in the wane, the king over all kings, the holiest and amongst all cavaliers the greatest, Sriranga Raya, the mighty King God gave this cowle unto Agent Thomas Ivie, Chief Captain of the English, and the Company of that nation.”

“For as much as you have left Armagon and arc come to Sriranga Rayapatam my town, at first hut of small esteem, and have there built a Fort and brought trade to the Port therefore, that you may be the better encouraged to prosecute the same and amplify the town which bears our name, we do freely release you of all customs or duties upon whatsoever goods brought or old in that place appertaining (unto) your Company. Also we grant unto your Company half of all the Customs or duties which shall be received at the Port, and the rents of the ground about the village Madraspatam as also the Jackal ground we give you towards your charges, by way of piscash".

"Moreover for the better managing your business, we surrender the government and justice of the town into your hands. And if any of your neighbours of Poonamallee shall injure you, we promise you our ready assistant . and for what provisions shall be brought out of that country we will that no junken (sunkam) be taken thereon.“

“If it fortune that any of your Company's ships shall by accident of weather or otherwise be driven ashore at that Port whatsoever can be saved shall remain your own and the like touching all the merchants that trade at the Port, if the owner comes to demand it; but. if the owner be not to be found, then our officers shall seize the same to our behalf."

"We also promise still to retain the town in our protection and not subject it to the government of Poonamallee or any other Nayak. And whatsoever merchandises of yours that shall pass through the country of Poonamallee, to pay but half customs."

"In confidence of this our cowle you may cheerfully proceed in your affairs; wherein if any of our people shall molest you,we give you our faith to take your cause into our own hands to do you right and assist you against them. And that this (your) Port and this our cowle may stand firm as long as the sun and moon."

-Sree Rama.

== Siege ==
In October–November 1645, Sriranga III confirmed the grants that had been given to the English. At the same time, he was engaged in the siege of Pulicat which had begun around August 1645. However, the situation soon became more difficult for him. In January 1646, the English reported that the Golconda general Mir Jumla II was advancing with a large army. To stop him Mallai gathered a strong force, including 3,000 soldiers withdrawn from the siege of Pulicat.

In December 1645, Sriranga III faced another threat from the Nayaks of Tanjore, Madurai, and Gingee, who had rebelled against him. they defeated his forces in a major battle. Taking advantage of this situation, Mir Jumla II captured the important fortress of Udayagiri Nellore after Mallai agreed to surrender it in return for safe passage for himself and his followers.

The following letter reports that Greenhill's mission was successful and gives details about the ongoing siege of Pulicat by the Raya:-

Our last unto you was the prymo october, 1 coppie where of goeth here with, to which please to be referred. In our foregoeing we advised you of our intention in Sending of Mr. Grinhill to the King, who is returned againe, and hath well effected what he went for, which was to have our old privalidge, with some addition, neiw confirmed by this King, and his letter for the avouchment of the warre betwixt him and the hollanders, and to maintaine us in the buying of such goods as was taken in the warre ; all which we have obtained under the Kings owne hand. Coppics thereof, translated out of Jentue into English, goeth here with for your perusall."

"Wee cannot denie your godly motion in sinding of us a Minnister heither to assist us in our prayers for better Succese. Soe haiving to our knowlege given answere unto your Letter and transcripts for as much as Concerneth the Companies busines, shall in a word or too accquante you how the warres stand betwixt the King of Vi[s]nagar and the Hollanders, and soe conclude."

"Ever since the seige of Pullacatt, which was begune the 12th August last, the King hath bine in warres with the King of Vizapore, and in Civell wares with three of his great Nagues ; soe that he to this tyme never had opportunitie to send a Considerable foorse aginst Pullacatt, more then 4,000 souldiers that la} T before it to Stopp the waves, that no goods should goe in or out. And now the King of Gulcondak hath sent his Generall, Meir Gumlack, 2 with a great Annie to appose this King, who is advance[d] to the Jentues Cuntry, where the King hath sent Mallay, who hath got togeather 50,000 souldiers, as reporte saith, whereof 3000 he sent for from Pullacatt to keepe the Mores from intrenching upon this Kings cuntrv. Soe their is now remainning before Pullacatt but one thousand, of which the Dutch made noe esteeme of."

Soon after, the armies of Bijapur Sultanate and Golconda Sultanate joined forces and marched against Vellore the capital of Sriranga III. They defeated him in a battle outside the city and forced him to pay a large indemnity to the Bijapur commanders. The rebellious Nayaks were eventually persuaded to return to their loyalty to the Raya.

== Aftermath ==
With Mallai's fall from power, the campaign against the Dutch at Pulicat came to an end. Mir Jumla II continued his advance conquering much of the surrounding territory. He became the ruler of Pulicat and San Thome and was reported to be only two days march from Madras on his way to Gingee. By this time, Golconda's influence was rapidly expanding, while the power of the Vijayanagara Empire was steadily declining.

== See also ==
- History of Madras
- Mir Jumla II
- Mughal Empire
