= Battle of Masti =

- Part of Deccani–Vijayanagar wars
Date	15 January 1646
Location	Masthi, Karnataka, India 12.87185°N 77.99820°E
Result	Disputed

Belligerents
Vijayanagar Empire: Kingdom of Mysore; Chennapatnam Nayaks; Kangundi Chiefs	Bijapur Sultanate

Commanders and leaders
Sriranga III; Jaggadeva Rao	Asad Khan; Shahaji

Casualties and losses
	Unknown number of infantry 1,000 Cavalry
- Location within South Asia

The Battle of Masti was a conflict between Vijayanagara Empire and Bijapur Sultanate fought in 1646 during the Bijapur invasion of the Vijayanagara Empire. Near Masti a Bijapur reinforcement force sent by Mustafa Khan was intercepted by an alliance led by Emperor Sriranga III and Jagadeva Rao, supported by the rulers of Mysore and Kangundi. The allied forces attacked from both the front and rear forcing the Bijapur Army to retreat after suffering heavy losses. Contemporary accounts differ regarding the outcome, with both Bijapur and Vijayanagara chronicles claiming victory.

== Background ==
In June 1646, the Bijapur Sultan Muhammad Adil Shah dispatched Mustafa Khan to subdue the Kanara territories under the control of Emperor Sriranga III of Vijayanagara. Advancing through Bakargunda, Mustafa Khan captured the fort of Gooty on the Malaprabha River. He then marched via Gadag and Lakshmeshwar to Honnahalli, where on October 30 he joined Asad Khan and Shahaji who had been sent ahead by Adil Shah to secure the Karnataka frontier. The army subsequently advanced to Sakrapatan. During the campaign several local chiefs and commanders joined the Bijapur forces including Shivappa Nayaka, Pad Nayaka of Harpanahalli, Jhujjar Rao, Abaji Rao Ghatge (brother of Keng Nayaka), the Desais of Lakshmeshwar and Koppal and Balaji Haibat Rao.

From Shivaganga, Mustafa Khan continued his advance toward the Vijayanagara territories. Venkayya Somaji, an envoy of Emperor Sriranga III arrived at Mustafa Khan's camp bearing proposals for peace and requested that the invasion be halted. Mustafa Khan, however, remained unconvinced and continued his march toward the Kanavai Pass near Vellore.

Mustafa Khan declared that he would suspend his advance only if Sriranga III withdrew from his conflict with the Nayaks of Tanjavur, Madurai and Gingee who had rebelled against imperial authority and agreed to conclude peace with them. Somaji promised to persuade the emperor to return to Vellore within a week and negotiate a settlement.

After receiving permission to depart, Somaji was accompanied by Mulla Ahmad who was sent as Bijapur's representative to discuss terms with Sriranga III and encourage him to meet Mustafa Khan near Nilipatan, located approximately twenty eight miles from Vellore in the Mysore uplands. Mustafa Khan halted before a difficult mountain pass while awaiting Mulla Ahmad's return. Although he had initially intended to detain Somaji in his camp and send Mulla Ahmad alone he eventually allowed the envoy to leave after Shahaji personally guaranteed Somaji's reliability and assumed responsibility for his conduct.

== Battle ==
Upon his return to Vellore, Venkayya Somaji advised Emperor Sriranga III to prepare for war against the Bijapur advance and secure the mountain passes leading into his territories. Acting on this advice, Sriranga III strengthened the defenses of the main routes into Karnataka and stationed troops to block the passes.

the direct approach to Sriranga III's domains was effectively closed to Mustafa Khan. Unable to advance through the heavily defended routes, the Bijapur commander was forced to alter his plans and seek an alternative path toward the Vijayanagara capital. He decided to march through the territories of Jagadeva Rao the ruler of Chennapatna in present-day Mysore and then descend into the plains through the passes of the Salem region.

When Mustafa Khan advanced southwestward with his army Sriranga III initially believed that the Bijapur Army had withdrawn from the campaign. However, he soon received reports that Mustafa Khan had entered the territories of Jagadeva Rao and established a camp at Masthi approximately thirty miles east of Bangalore.

In response, Sriranga III marched to Gudiyattam in the North Arcot region and then advanced through Jagadeva Raya's territories to Krishnagiri Fort in the northwestern part of the Salem district. Around this time, Shahaji and Asad Khan who were likely responsible for the defense of nearby forts requested reinforcements from Mustafa Khan. He promptly dispatched a cavalry force under his sar-khayl (cavalry commander) with orders to advance rapidly.

The reinforcement force soon encountered resistance, as its route had been blocked by the Vijayanagara Army. A battle followed in which Jagadeva Raya and Sriranga III attacked from the front, while the rulers of Mysore and Kangundi struck from the rear. Although the Bijapur court historian Zahur claimed a victory for the Bijapur Army contemporary accounts indicate that they suffered a setback and were forced to retreat approximately three miles, losing around thousand cavalrymen and a large number of soldiers.

== See also ==
- Shah Jahan
- Tirumala Nayaka
- Mir Jumla II
