= Mysore–Bijapur War (1652–1654) =

- Part of Vijayanagara-Deccani Wars
Date	1652–1654
Location	Karnataka, Tamil Nadu, India
Result	Bijapur victory

Belligerents
Kingdom of Mysore; Vijayanagar Empire; Chief of Sira	Bijapur Sultanate; Supported by: Madurai Nayakas

Commanders and leaders
Kanthirava Narasaraja I Dasarjaiya †; Balaji Haibat Rao †; Sriranga III; Siddi Raihan	Khan Muhammad; Shahaji; Balaji Haibat Rao (AWOL); Siddi Masud; Tirumala Nayaka

The Mysore–Bijapur War (1652–1654) was a conflict between the Kingdom of Mysore under Kanthirava Narasaraja I and the Bijapur Sultanate led by Khan Muhammad and Shahaji. The war began when Kanthirava Narasaraja I allied with Emperor Sriranga III and Siddi Raihan of Sira in an effort to restore Sriranga III's authority and challenge Bijapur Sultanate influence in the Carnatic region. After initially capturing several forts in Jagadeva Raya's territory, the Mysore-led alliance was driven back by Bijapur forces. Khan Muhammad captured various forts, defeated Mysore armies at Krishnagiri and Kaveripattanam and forced Kanthirava Narasaraja I to negotiate a settlement. The war ended with a treaty under which Mysore retained its independence but agreed to pay tribute to the Bijapur Sultanate.

== Background ==
Kanthirava Narasaraja I undertook a campaign against the Bijapur Sultanate with the aim of restoring Emperor Sriranga III to his former position. After losing much of his territory, Sriranga III sought refuge at the court of Mysore. According to the Portuguese writer Proença, the emperor was received with great honor by Kanthirava Narasaraja I, who offered him a province for his residence and treatment befitting his royal rank. This account is supported by the Kannada chronicle Mysore Rajara Charitre.

=== Mysore-Vijayanagar-Sira Alliance ===
Sriranga III remained in Mysore for about two years, during which he rebuilt his strength and planned to recover his lost territories. Proença states that, encouraged by the support and hospitality of the Mysore ruler, Sriranga III entered the field with an army provided by Mysore. Kanthirava Narasaraja I therefore undertook the campaign as part of an effort to restore the Vijayanagara Empire.

Another factor behind the campaign was Kanthirava's alliance with Siddi Raihan of Sira, who had rebelled against the Bijapur Sultanate. The Mysore ruler's support for both Sriranga III and the rebel chief brought Kingdom of Mysore into direct conflict with Bijapur Sultanate.

=== Bijapur-Madurai Alliance ===
Tirumala Nayaka of Madurai viewed the alliance between Kanthirava Narasaraja I, Sriranga III and Siddi Raihan with concern. He feared that the growing power of the alliance would threaten his position. Seeking to counter their influence, Tirumala Nayaka appealed to the Mohammad Adil Shah Sultan of Bijapur for support. He reopened the passes through the Western Ghats to facilitate the movement of Bijapur's forces and encouraged the Sultan to declare war against the Kingdom of Mysore.

While the allied forces of Kanthirava Narasaraja I, Sriranga III, and Siddi Raihan were operating in the territory of Jagadeva Raya, Khan Muhammad a general of the Bijapur Sultanate was engaged in the siege of Penukonda. His original intention was to return to Bijapur after the capture of the fort. However, Sayyad Narullah, a representative of the Bijapur Sultan, met Khan Muhammad and urged him to advance into Jagadeva Raya's territory and suppress the growing power of Kanthirava Narasaraja I.

The alliance between Kanthirava Narasaraja I, Sriranga III and Siddi Raihan had not only alarmed Tirumala Nayaka of Madurai, who had previously opposed Sriranga III but also drawn the Bijapur Sultanate into the conflict. Tirumala Nayaka feared that Sriranga III supported by Mysore and Siddi Raihan, would become powerful enough destroy his kingdom. He therefore encouraged the Mohammed Adil Shah of Bijapur to take action against the alliance.

In response, the Sultan Mohammed Adil Shah of Bijapur ordered Khan Muhammad to abandon his planned return to Bijapur and march against Kanthirava Narasaraja I. Accompanied by Shahaji, Khan Muhammad advanced into the territory of Jagadeva Raya.

== War ==
=== Mysore Conquests ===
Between November 1652 and January 1653, Kanthirava Narasaraja I and his allies captured a series of forts in rapid succession including Ratnagiri, Virabhadradurga, Kengerekote, Pennagaram, Denkanikottai and Dharmapuri. These forts were administered by Yatibala Rao, Shahaji's representative in the region, who is referred to as Balaji Haibat Rao in the Muhammad Nama. Through these victories, Kanthirava Narasaraja I recovered most of the territory in Jagadeva Raya's domain that had previously been conquered by Mustafa Khan.

=== Bijapur Reconquests ===
In response, Shahaji and Khan Muhammad undertook a campaign to reconquer the lost territories. Siddi Raihan submitted to the Bijapur forces, weakening the Mysore-led alliance. The Bijapur army subsequently recaptured the forts that had been seized by Kanthirava Narasaraja I and his allies.

==== Siege of Krishnagiri ====
The most important engagement of the campaign centered on the fort of Krishnagiri. Owing to its strong fortifications, advantageous location, powerful artillery, and Mysore garrison the fort presented a formidable obstacle. Khan Muhammad laid siege to Krishnagiri and eventually captured it. Following the fall of the fort, Kanthirava Narasaraja I retreated to Mysore.

=== First Bijapur Invasion of Mysore ===
==== Siege of Mysore ====
After evacuating Krishnagiri, Kanthirava Narasaraja I retreated to Mysore, where he strengthened the city's defenses and prepared to resist the advancing Bijapur army. However, he was unable to halt their advance. Khan Muhammad and Shahaji pursued the Mysore ruler to his capital, captured Mysore and seized three additional forts during the war. As a result, Sriranga III was left isolated at Vellore without the support of his principal ally.

==== Battle of Kaveripattanam ====
Despite the setback, Sriranga III remained determined to continue the struggle. He dispatched Mir Jumla II to the Mughal court to seek assistance against Bijapur Sultanate. This diplomatic move demanded the immediate attention of Khan Muhammad. Khan Muhammad abandoned the forts he had recently captured in Mysore and marched toward Vellore to confront the renewed threat posed by Sriranga III.

As soon as Khan Muhammad withdrew from Mysore, Kanthirava Narasaraja I dispatched his general Dasarajaiya to Kaveripattanam to oppose the Bijapur army. Khan Muhammad was then required to conduct operations on two fronts at Vellore and Kaveripattanam. In response, he detached a force under Siddi Masud to confront the Mysore army.

In October 1653, the two forces met in a battle at Kaveripattanam. Dasarajaiya was defeated and killed, resulting in a victory for the Bijapur army.

==== Siege of Vellore ====
In November 1654, Khan Muhammad subsequently laid siege to the fort of Vellore. Unable to withstand the siege Sriranga III fled from the fort leaving the garrison behind. Recognizing the futility of continued resistance, he entered into negotiations with Khan Muhammad and sought peace. A settlement was reached under which Chandragiri and its dependent territories were granted to Sriranga III.

After taking possession of Kaveripattanam and Vellore, Khan Muhammad turned his attention to the Nayak of Madurai and demanded the payment of tribute.

=== Second Bijapur Invasion of Mysore ===
When Khan Muhammad demanded tribute from the Nayak of Madurai, the latter replied that he should first defeat the ruler of Mysore before expecting such payment. This response together with continuing hostilities between Mysore and Bijapur contributed to a renewed Bijapur war against Kanthirava Narasaraja I.

Kanthirava had repeatedly resisted the Bijapur forces at Krishnagiri, Mysore and Kaveripattanam. Earlier, when Sriranga III sought support from the Mughal Empire, Khan Muhammad had abandoned his recent conquests in Mysore and marched against Vellore. He may have expected that Mysore would no longer interfere in Bijapur's operations. However, Kanthirava subsequently dispatched his general Dasarajaiya to Kaveripattanam to oppose the Bijapur army. Combined with the encouragement of Tirumala Nayaka of Madurai to take action against Mysore, this led Khan Muhammad and Shahaji to launch another invasion of Mysore territory.

The Bijapur army advanced into Mysore and carried out extensive plundering. In response, Kanthirava Narasaraja I dispatched Balaji Haibat Rao to halt the advance of the invading forces. During the invasion Balaji Haibat Rao was killed in a battle against the forces of Siddi Masud.

== Aftermath ==
Kanthirava Narasaraja I then entered into a treaty with Khan Muhammad. Under the terms of the agreement, Kanthirava Narasaraja I agreed to bear the expenses of the war and to pay an annual tribute in exchange for the restoration of his kingdom. The treaty was subsequently ratified by the Sultan of Bijapur, and Mysore remained under the rule of Kanthirava Narasaraja I.

Khan Muhammad received tribute and gifts from the Mysore ruler as part of the settlement. Before departing from the region, he also extracted substantial contributions from the Nayak of Madurai. He then returned to Bijapur with the tribute and spoils acquired during the war.

== List of Conflicts ==
Conflicts	Time	Location	Belligerent		Result
Conflicts	Time	Location	Kingdom of Mysore Vijayanagara Empire Chief of Sira	Bijapur Sultanate Madurai Nayakas	Result
Siege of Ratnagiri (1652)	1652	Ratnagiri	Kanthirava Narasaraja I Sriranga III; Siddi Raihan	Balaji Haibat Rao	Mysore-Allied victory
Siege of Virabhadradurga (1652)	1652	Virabhadradurga	Kanthirava Narasaraja I Sriranga III; Siddi Raihan	Balaji Haibat Rao	Mysore-Allied victory
Siege of Kengerekote (1652)	1652	Kengerekote	Kanthirava Narasaraja I Sriranga III; Siddi Raihan	Balaji Haibat Rao	Mysore-Allied victory
Siege of Pennagaram (1652)	1652	Pennagaram	Kanthirava Narasaraja I Sriranga III; Siddi Raihan	Balaji Haibat Rao	Mysore-Allied victory
Siege of Denkanikottai (1652)	1652	Denkanikottai	Kanthirava Narasaraja I Sriranga III; Siddi Raihan	Balaji Haibat Rao	Mysore-Allied victory
Siege of Dharmapuri (1652)	1652	Dharmapuri	Kanthirava Narasaraja I Sriranga III; Siddi Raihan	Balaji Haibat Rao	Mysore-Allied victory
Siege of Krishnagiri (1653)	1653	Krishnagiri	Kanthirava Narasaraja I Sriranga III	Khan Muhammad; Shahaji; Siddi Masud	Bijapur victory
Siege of Mysore (1653)	1653	Mysore	Kanthirava Narasaraja I	Khan Muhammad; Shahaji; Siddi Masud	Bijapur Allied victory
Battle of Kaveripattanam (1653)	1653	Kaveripattanam	Kanthirava Narasaraja I Dasarajaiya †	Khan Muhammad; Shahaji; Siddi Masud	Bijapur victory
Siege of Vellore (1654)	1654	Vellore	Sriranga III	Khan Muhammad; Shahaji	Bijapur victory
Bijapur Invasion of Mysore (1654)	1654	Kingdom of Mysore	Kanthirava Narasaraja I Balaji Haibat Rao †	Khan Muhammad; Shahaji; Siddi Masud	Bijapur victory

== See also ==
- Gingee Nayaks
- Shivaji
- Jai Singh I
