= Raja Desingu =

- Theatrical release poster
- Directed by: T. R. Raghunath
- Written by: Kannadasan; Makkalanban
- Produced by: Lena Chettiar
- Starring: M. G. Ramachandran; S. S. Rajendran; Bhanumathi; Padmini
- Cinematography: M. A. Rehman
- Edited by: V. B. Natarajan
- Music by: G. Ramanathan
- Production company: Krishna Pictures
- Release date: 2 September 1960
- Running time: 161 minutes
- Country: India
- Language: Tamil

Raja Desingu (transl. King Desingu) is a 1960 Indian Tamil-language biographical film starring M. G. Ramachandran, S. S. Rajendran, Bhanumathi and Padmini. Based on the life of Desingh, the film was directed by T. R. Raghunath and had a delayed release on 2 September 1960.

== Plot ==
Raja Swaroop Singh Bundela won the respect and loyalty of the people of Senji during his rule, where Hindus and Muslims lived in peace and prosperity. A son was born to Swaroop Singh and his wife Rambai Bundela, whom they named Tej Singh Bundela pronounced as Desingu in Tamil. Swaroop Singh has a secret Muslim concubine called Jaan Bibi, and they have a son called Dawood Khan, who was a little older than Desingu. Fearing that Dawood might pose a threat to the succession of the throne in years to come, on the advice of his commander and close confidant Yusuf Khan, Swaroop Singh persuades Jaan Bibi to leave Senji, taking little Dawood with her. Desingu, who has integrity and courage grows up with his childhood friend, another brave young man called Mohammed Khan, and two are always inseparable.

At this juncture, the Sultan of Delhi offers to free any state coming under his dominion whose ruler manages to tame a wild horse in his stable. Hearing this in the intention to have a free kingdom, Swaroop Singh leaves to Delhi without letting know Rambai and Desingu. Despite trying very hard, he failed to tame the wild horse and was imprisoned by the Sultan of Delhi. Upon hearing this, the minister informs Desingu, who rushes to Delhi where he meets his uncle Bheem Singh Bundela for advice. The dauntless Desingu manages to tame the stallion and ride it, to the loud cheers of the huge audience. Filled with admiration, the Sultan frees Swaroop Singh, who had earlier failed in this endeavour and gives them a written proclamation of Senji's independence. Desingu marries Ranibai Bundela, who is Bheem Singh's daughter. Pandiyan, who works in the horse stable comes along to Senji and works as assistant to Mohamad Khan's father and falls in love and marries Sengkamalam, who is also Mohamad Khan's adopted sister.

Meanwhile, growing up as an illegitimate child, Dawood vows to rule Senji some day. But on her deathbed, Jaan Bibi extracts a promise from Dawood that he would not cause any harm to Desingu. Dawood goes to Arcot and wins the confidence of the Nawab, when he rescues the Nawab's infant son from being crushed under an elephant's feet. The grateful Nawab appoints him as his general. When Dawood expresses his determination to subjugate Senji, the Nawab expresses his helplessness, stating that nothing could be done as long as Desingu has the written proclamation of Senji's independence in his custody. It is around the same time that Desingu dismisses his general Yusuf Khan from service when he is caught trying to commit adultery molesting Sengkamalam. Abetted by the humiliated Yusuf Khan who has now turned traitor, Dawood makes use of his striking resemblance to Desingu and extracts the written parchment from the unsuspecting wife of Desingu.

When Mohammed Khan falls in love with the pretty Ayisha, he anticipates no opposition from his parents for the match. However, he finds that his mother and father have each identified a girl of their own choice to be his wife. When he informs them that he has already chosen his life partner, his father proposes that they go the queen for an appropriate decision. Ranibai asks each of them to write down the name of the girl they have in mind, and then discovers that all 3 of them have written Ayisha's name.

When the royal astrologer suggests that Desingu and Ranibai be separated for 3 years as an antidote for the inauspicious placement of their stars, Desingu pours scorn upon such beliefs. However, considering the welfare of Senji and heeding to his mother's plea, Desingu is forced to consent to such separation. He carries on stolidly with his responsibilities as the ruler of Senji during the day.

The Nawab of Arcot and Dawood Khan send a man to meet Desingu to request Senji kingdom to pay tax. Desingu announces in agony that Senji would not bow to the Sultanate of Delhi. Now that Senji had no proof of its independence, Arcot declares war on Senji for non-payment of taxes. Under the resolute leadership of Mohammed Khan, Senji emerges triumphant in warding off the Arcot forces. But even as Mohammed Khan fetches water to quench the thirst of a dying soldier of Arcot, Yusuf Khan shoots him from the back. And not satisfied with dastardly act, Yusuf Khan kills Mohammed Khan's fiancée Ayisha, who had come to the battlefield in search of her beloved. Wanting the brothers to fight against each other now, Yusuf Khan carries false reports to Desingu that it was Dawood who killed Mohammed Khan. Thirsting for revenge for the death of his friend, Desingu rushes to the war front and soon challenges Dawood to a duel. Dawood is hesitant to fight with his brother, and even advises Desingu that they could leave the fighting to their troops. But Desingu is no mood to listen and soon the brothers are engaged in a bitter duel. Handicapped by his oath not to harm Desingu, Dawood is soon vanquished and lies mortally wounded. Desingu's delight is short-lived, for Yusuf Khan now informs him that Dawood is none other than his brother. Adding to his grief at the death of his friend, Desingu is horrified at having killed his brother, and in a moment of abject remorse, kills himself.

== Cast ==
Cast according to the opening credits

Male cast

- M. G. Ramachandran as Desingu / Dawood Khan
- S. S. Rajendran as Mohamed Khan
- T. S. Balaiah
- K. A. Thangavelu as Pandiyan
- M. G. Chakrapani as Nawab of Arcot
- T. K. Ramachandran as General Yusuf Khan
- O. A. K. Thevar as King Swaroop Singh
- M. R. Santhanam as Bheem Singh
- R. Balasubramaniam
- Alwar Kuppusami
- M. N. Krishnan
- Karikol Raju as Minister
- Thirupathisami
- Venkatachalam as Royal Astrologer
- Kalaivanar N. S. Krishnan as Mohamed Khan's Father

Stunt

- R. N. Nambiar

Female cast

- Bhanumathi as Ranibai
- Padmini as Ayisha
- M. N. Rajam as Sengamalam
- T. A. Madhuram as Mohamed Khan's Mother
- Lakshmiprabha as Jaan Bibi
- M. Saroja
- Rushyendramani as Queen Rambai

Dance

- Kamalalakshman
- Ragini
- Kusalakumari

Choreographers

- Vazhuvoor Ramaiah Pillai
- P. S. Gopala Krishnan
- Thangaraj
- Chinni-Sampath

== Production ==
Raja Desingu is based on the life of Desingh, with M. G. Ramachandran portraying the title character, renamed Desingu. The film was in production for over two years due to various troubles. The director T. R. Raghunath had already shot a Bharatanatyam sequence with Padmini, when her character was initially written as a Hindu princess. When the character was changed into a Muslim, the song became incongruous. Ramachandran objected to it, and the sequence was removed. However, when the film was released, it was a flop. So, the producer included Padmini's dance scene and re-released the film. This dance is not included in the DVD of the film.

== Soundtrack ==
The music composed by G. Ramanathan and the lyrics were penned by Udumalai Narayana Kavi, Kannadasan, and Thanjai N. Ramaiah Dass. The songs Vanamevum Raajakumaraa and Sarasaraani Kalyani were well received.

Song	Singers	Length
"Aadhi Kadavul Ondruthan'	Seerkazhi Govindarajan	02:52
"Iyalodu Isaipole"	C. S. Jayaraman & P. Bhanumathi	01:24
"Kaadhalin Bimbam"	P. Susheela	
"Kanangkuruvi Kaattuppuraa"	Seerkazhi Govindarajan & P. Leela	04:07
"Mannavane Senji"	Seerkazhi Govindarajan & P. Leela	
"Paarkadal Alaimele"	M. L. Vasanthakumari	07:25
"Vanamevum Raajakumaraa"	Seerkazhi Govindarajan & Jikki	04:19
"Podapporaaru"	P. Leela	
"Sarasaraani Kalyani"	C. S. Jayaraman & P. Bhanumathi	02:54
"Vaazhga Engal"	P. Leela & Jikki	
"Pazhanimalai"	P. Leela	
"Vandhaan Paaru"	Seerkazhi Govindarajan & P. Leela	

== Release and reception ==
Raja Desingu was released on 2 September 1960. The Indian Express praised the film for showing the Muslim community in a favourable light, and Ramachandran's dual role performance. According to historian Randor Guy, Ramachandran's fans did not want their favourite actor to die onscreen, and had not arrived to theatres to see the film. The film was declared a failure due to its protracted production schedule; its theatrical run lasted 6–7 weeks.
