= Battle of Wandiwash (1648) =

- Part of Deccani–Vijayanagar wars
Date	1648
Location	Vandavasi, Tamilnadu, India 12.504°N 79.606°E
Result	Golconda Victory

Belligerents
Vijayanagara Empire; Madurai Nayakas; Kingdom of Mysore; Bijapur Sultanate	Golconda Sultanate; Velugoti Nayaks

Commanders and leaders
Sriranga III; Kanthirava Narasaraja I Tirumala Nayaka; Mustafa Khan; Shahaji	Mir Jumla II; Tubaki Krishnappa Nayaka
- Location within South Asia

Battle of Wandiwash (1648) was a military conflict fought near Wandiwash between the forces of the Golconda Sultanate under Mir Jumla II and the combined armies of Kingdom of Mysore, Madurai Nayakas and Bijapur Sultanate. Seeking to Support Sriranga III and resist Golconda's expansion into the Carnatic region, Mysore and Madurai joined forces and received military support from Mustafa Khan. Several Vijayanagara nobles, including the Velugoti chiefs sided with Mir Jumla II during the conflict. The battle ended in a Golconda victory, with the allied forces of Mysore, Madurai and Bijapur being defeated and routed. Following the victory, Mir Jumla II occupied Wandiwash and advanced against Gingee further extending Golconda's authority across much of the Carnatic region.

== Background ==
Following his defeat at the Battle of Vellore in 1646, Sriranga III fled from his capital as the Bijapur army under Mustafa Khan occupied the region. Mustafa Khan after securing the region withdrew to Bijapur.

Meanwhile, Mir Jumla II, commanding the Golconda forces, advanced south after capturing Udayagiri. Moving rapidly along the eastern coast, he seized Tondamanad, Tirupati and Chandragiri in quick succession before April 1646. He then marched against the important port of Pulicat. Although Mir Jumla II attempted to reach an agreement with the Dutch, negotiations failed because the Dutch refused to recognize the Sultan of Golconda as the sovereign ruler of the region.

Despite the ongoing crisis, Sriranga III left Vellore to meet the Nayak rulers at Tirupandalam in an effort to secure their support. The arrangements he made for the defense of the capital during his absence are not known. However, the fact that Mir Jumla II did not attempt to attack Vellore during his conquests suggests that the city was adequately protected.

The conference at Tirupandalam proved unsuccessful. The Nayak rulers, divided by mutual rivalries, were unable to reach a united decision or form an effective alliance in support of Sriranga III.

Sriranga III appears to have lost hope of defending the kingdom. Returning to Vellore was no longer a viable option, as Mir Jumla II's forces were rapidly overrunning the surrounding region. After remaining at Pulicat for eight days, Mir Jumla resumed his conquest, plundering and devastating the countryside. The advance of the Golconda army caused widespread panic among the local Hindu nobility some fled, while others submitted to or joined Mir Jumla II.

During the conquest, Mir Jumla captured Ponneri, Poonamallee, Kanchipuram and Chingleput in succession. He then advanced as far as the frontiers of Gingee before withdrawing to Kanchipuram in March 1648, where he remained during the rainy season.

Faced with the continued advance of Golconda's forces and unable to recover his capital, Sriranga III abandoned plans to return to Vellore and instead sought refuge at the court of the Nayak of Thanjavur.

== Battle ==
Sriranga III was compelled by circumstances to withdraw from the struggle. The responsibility for defending the country and organizing resistance, which he had unsuccessfully attempted to coordinate, now fell upon the Nayak rulers. However, the Nayaks remained as divided as ever. The Nayaks of Thanjavur and Gingee were too weak to consider effective resistance, while only Mysore and Madurai made a limited effort to unite against the approaching threat.

The rulers of Mysore and Madurai combined their forces and received some assistance from Mustafa Khan of Bijapur. They then confronted the Golconda army on the plain outside Wandiwash. Several Vijayanagara nobles, including the Velugoti chiefs submitted to Mir Jumla II and joined his side against the Nayaks. In the battle that followed, the combined forces of Mysore, Madurai and Bijapur were defeated and driven from the field.

== Aftermath ==
Following the victory at Wandiwash, Mir Jumla occupied Wandiwash and several other towns before advancing to besiege Gingee. As a result of these successes, the authority of the Sultan of Golconda was established over a large part of the Carnatic region.

== See also ==
- Golconda Fort
- Madanna and Akkanna
- François Bernier
