= Battle of Pulicat =

- Part of Deccani–Vijayanagar wars
Date	1644
Location	Pulicat, Tamil Nadu, India 13.4177°N 80.3185°E
Result	Vijaynagara victory

Belligerents
Vijayanagara Empire; Dutch Republic	Golconda Sultanate

Commanders and leaders
Sriranga III	Abdullah Qutb Shah
- Location within South Asia

The Battle of Pulicat (1644) was a military conflict fought between the forces of the Vijayanagara Empire and the Golconda Sultanate near Pulicat on the Coromandel Coast. After advancing southward and threatening the Dutch settlement at Pulicat the Golconda army was met by a large force sent by the Sriranga III. The Vijayanagara troops defeated the Golconda Army and drove them back beyond Armagon.

== Background ==
In January 1644, the English at Madras learned that Damarla Venkatappa Nayak had completely fallen out of favor with the Sriranga III and had been removed from his position. His place was given to Mallai (also called Chinnai Chetty) a powerful merchant who had long acted as an intermediary for the Dutch in their dealings with local Indians. The Dutch supported Mallai by providing troops and artillery to help him capture forts that were still controlled by the Damarla Nayaks, who were hostile to Dutch interests. As a result, there were growing fears that Mallai would soon become the dominant authority along the Coromandel Coast.

The Portuguese at San Thome were no longer considered a major force. The Dutch even claimed that they planned to capture San Thome when their fleet returned, raising fears that the Portuguese might be completely expelled from the Coromandel Coast. Mallai Chetty acted with great confidence and sought to establish authority over Madras. He demanded that he receive half of the customs revenue from the city, taking the place previously held by the Damarla Nayaks.

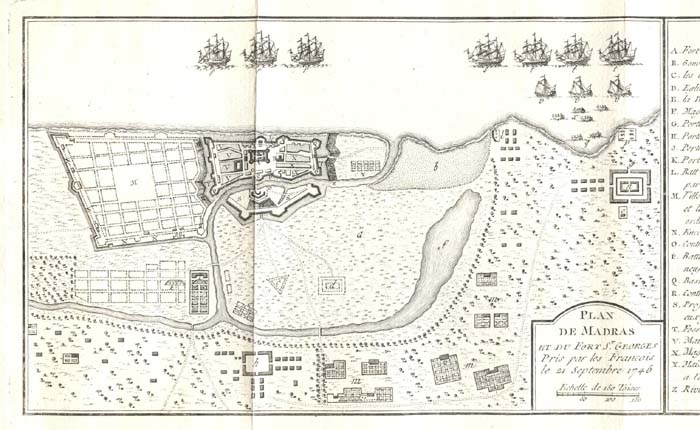
Plan of Madras and of the Fort of St. George September, 1746

The English were alarmed by this demand. They feared that if Mallai's claim was accepted, the Dutch would gain greater influence over Madras and increase customs duties to harm English trade and benefit their own interests. the English decided to defend all their existing rights and privileges. They also resolved to respond firmly to any actions taken by Mallai that threatened or interfered with their position.

== Battle ==
The situation improved after a few months, and fears of aggression from Mallai Chetty gradually disappeared. However, a new threat soon emerged. The army of Golconda was steadily advancing southward along the coast. Although it had been temporarily pushed back, it continued to threaten the region around Fort St. George.

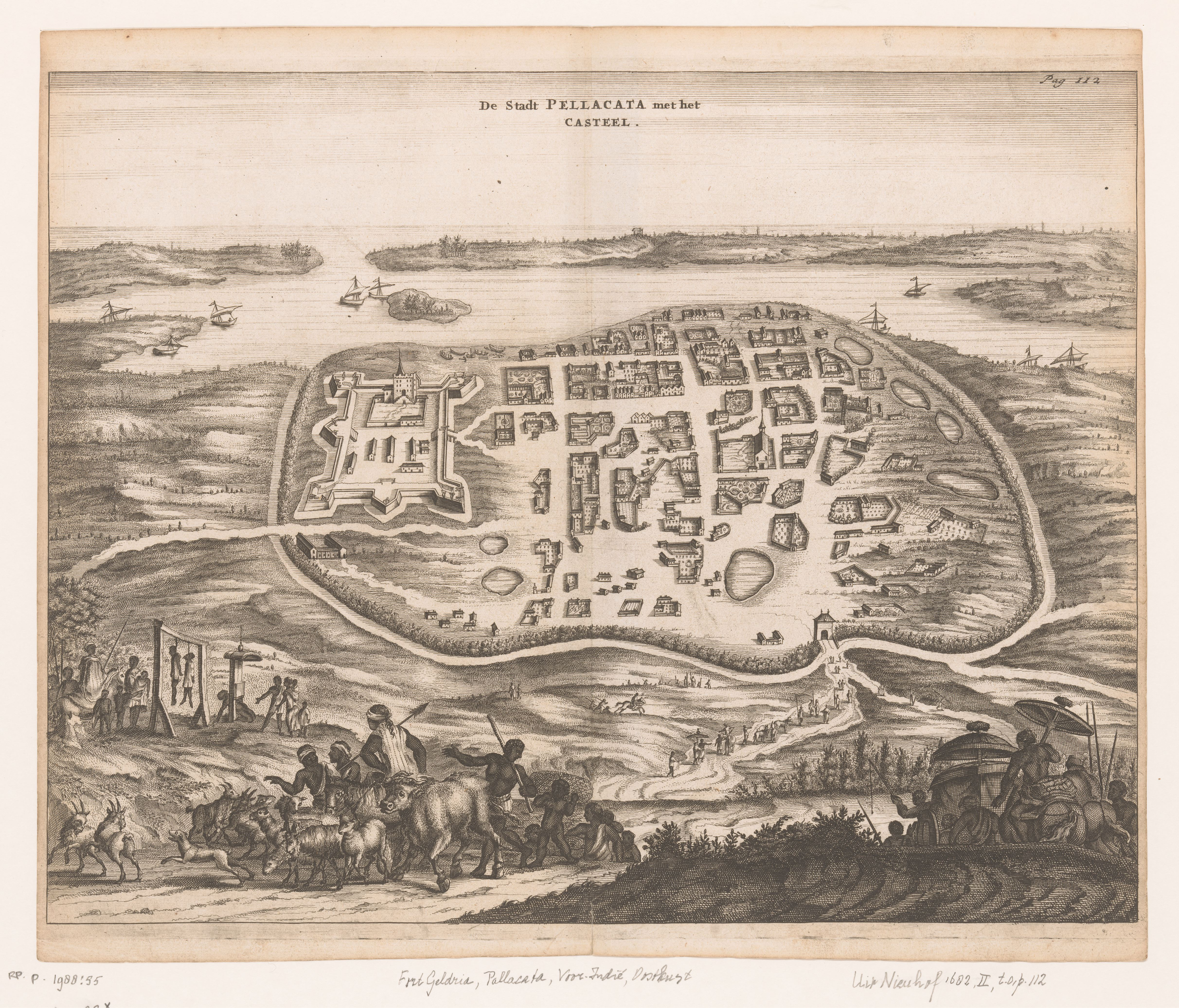
Pulicat

In a letter dated 8 September 1644, the English factories reported to the Company:

"The Moors but five weeks past had advanced with their arms within three miles of Pulicat and sent unto the Dutch Governor to surrender up their castle; and we did suddenly expect the same; but shortly after the Jentues (Raya's troops) came down with a great power, gave the Moors battle, routed their army and put the Moors to flight beyond Armagon, where they are now' gathering a head again, so the danger that we live in is yet unknown."

== See also ==
- Dutch India
- Madras
- Batavia
