= Sivasubramanian Srikantan =

Dr. S. Srikantan
- Born: 6 September 1933; Kaveripattinam, Tamilnadu,
- Died: 19 August 2006 (aged 73)
- Education: College of Engineering, Guindy Anna University, Chennai; University of Pennsylvania, Philadelphia, USA; Moore School of Electrical Engineering, Philadelphia, USA
- Known for: TROMBAY Digital Computer (TDC-12)
- Spouse: Nirmala Srikantan
- Children: Rabindra Srikantan and Geetha Srikantan
- Awards: Vikram Sarabhai Research Award (1974)
- Scientific career
- Fields: Electronics, Computer, Telecommunication
- Workplaces: Electronics Corporation of India Limited

Dr. Sivasubramanian Srikantan (6 September 1933 - 19 August 2006) was an Indian scientist, research lead, former Managing Director – Karnataka State Electronics Development Corporation Ltd (KEONICS), Chairman – Yokogawa Keonics Ltd, Director – Krone Communications Ltd, Managing Director – Andhra Pradesh Electronics Development Corporation Ltd (APEDC), Head, Computer Group – Electronics Corporation of India Ltd (ECIL), Group Leader – Babha Atomic Research Centre (BARC), and Chairman – ASM Technologies Ltd. (1992-2006)

== Early life and education ==
Dr. Sivasubramanian Srikantan was born in the village of Kaveripattinam (Dharmapuri), around 100 km away from Bangalore. Dr. Srikantan completed his schooling at the local government school in Kaveripattinam and did his Pre-University at St. Joseph's College, Bangalore. He then joined the College of Engineering, Guindy at Anna University, Chennai, where he completed his Electrical Engineering in 1954. After successfully becoming an Electrical Engineer, Dr. S. Srikantan underwent training at the Atomic Energy Establishment training school in Mumbai which was headed by Homi J. Bhabha. With the support from Government of India and encouragement from Dr. Homi J Bhabha, he was later sent to the University of Pennsylvania in Philadelphia, USA where he completed his Master's in 1962 and Ph.D. in 1964 from the Moore School of Electrical Engineering.

== Personal life ==
Son of T.Sivasubramanyam, was married to Nirmala Srikantan. The couple had two children, son Rabindra Srikantan – a tech entrepreneur and daughter Geetha Srikantan – a technology expert. Rabindra has two sons Nikhil Rabindra and Akhil Rabindra.

== Professional life ==
Dr. Srikantan, returned to India after his Ph.D. and led a team of fresh graduate engineers and scientists to work on TDC-12 (Trombay Digital Computer – 12) ‘the first Indian-built electronic digital computer at Bhabha Atomic Research Centre on January 21, 1969

Dr. Srikantan started the computer division of Electronics Corporation of India Limited (ECIL) and was responsible for introducing a range of digital computers, to name the most significant of them TDC-16 and TDC-332 He laid the foundation for ECIL, a commercial venture which started as a R&D activity at Bhabha Atomic Research Centre (BARC)

== Distinguished positions ==
- Tamilnadu Electricity Board (1954 -1955)
- Scientist, Bhabha Atomic Research Centre (1961 -1969)
- Head Computer Group, Electronics Corporation of India Limited (1969-1981)
- Managing Director, Andhra Pradesh Electronics Development Corporation Ltd (1981-1983)
- Managing Director, Karnataka State Electronics Development Corporation Ltd (1983-1991)
- Director, Krone Communications Ltd
- Chairman, Yokogawa Keonics Ltd (1987-1992)
- Chairman, ASM Technologies Ltd (1992-2006)

== Award ==
Dr. S.Srikantan has received the VIKRAM SHARABHAI RESEARCH AWARD endowed by Hari Om Ashram in the year 1974 in the field of Electronics and Telecommunications.

== Dr. S Srikantan Memorial Award ==
ASM Technologies Limited under its CSR initiative along with The Institution of Electronics & Telecommunication Engineers (IETE) Bangalore Centre has been organizing ‘Summer School in Electronics & Computers’ (SUSIEC) for 9th and 10th standard students during their summer vacations. The students compete in the science projects and are awarded Dr. S Srikantan Memorial Award for the best projects.
