= Masthi =

- village
- Country: India
- State: Karnataka
- District: Kolar
- Talukas: Malur

Population (2001)
  - Total: 6,409

Languages
  - Official: Kannada
- Time zone: UTC+5:30 (IST)

Masthi is a village in the southern state of Karnataka, India. It is located in the Malur taluk of Kolar district in Karnataka.

== Demographics ==
As of 2001 India census, Masthi had a population of 6,409 with 3,276 males and 3,133 females.

== History ==
Although early history is unknown, it is known that this place was ruled by "Maha Hasti" (pah-leh-gara) (petty chieftains) until a new system of governance was introduced after English entry into Mysore. Masthi had a significant Brahmin population in mid 1900s but not many remain to this day. Masthi Venkatesha Iyengar, a Kannada writer, is from Masthi.

== See also ==
- Districts of Karnataka
