= Kullur =

Coordinates: 12°49′50″N 78°02′27″E

Koollu
- village
- Interactive map of Koollu
- Country: India
- State: Tamil Nadu
- District: Krishnagiri

Government
  - Type: Panchayati raj (India)
  - Body: Gram panchayat

Languages
  - Official: Tamil
- Time zone: UTC+5:30 (IST)

Koollu is a village in the Hosur taluk of Krishnagiri district, Tamil Nadu, India.
