= Desingh =

Indian Raja who ruled in 1714

Raja Desingh or Raja Tej Singh was a king of the Bundela Rajput who ruled Gingee in 1714 CE.

== Background ==
The Mughal Empire defeated the Maratha Empire at Gingee in February 1698.

In return for military services, the Mughal Emperor Aurangzeb, granted a mansab rank of 2,500 and jagir land grant of 12 lakhs (1,200,000) to Raja Swarup Singh, a Bundela Rajput chieftain, along with the kiladari (fort commandership) of Gingee in 1700 AD. Raja Swarup Singh died of old age in 1714 AD. Hearing about the death of his father, Desingh, the newly married son of Raja Swarup Singh, started for Gingee from Bundelkhand, his ancestral home. Differing accounts have the Nawab of Arcot, Saadatullah Khan I somewhat recalcitrant to the Mughal Empire, and the terms of the grant from Aurangzeb were disputed, nevertheless a debt was claimed after Aurangzeb's death ... a debt that the Raja refused to pay, eventually the arrears of payments due amounted to 70 lakhs rupees (7 million), and being a defaulter for ten years; the Nawab of Arcot reported this matter to the Mughal Emperor at the time, Bahadur Shah I at Delhi.

== Battle for Gingee ==
Traditional plays and ballads are sung in and around Gingee about the gallantry displayed by Desingh at the young age of 22, against the more powerful Nawab Sadatulla Khan of Arcot in a struggle that was unmatched from the outset (Desingh’s army consisted of only 350 horses and 500 troopers, while the Nawab’s army had 8,000 horsemen and 10,000 sepoys). Desingh eventually died in battle and his small army was defeated. His young wife committed Sati on his funeral pyre. However, the fortress of Gingee lost its pre-eminent position and political importance within a few years of the extinction of the Rajput rule.

Desingh Bundela Rajput (Tamil) Gingee Fort Commander
Preceded by Raja Swarup Singh	Desingh; 1714–1715	Succeeded by extinguished
