= Swarup Singh of Gingee =

Commander of Jinji Fort from 1700 to 1714

Swarup Singh

Commander of Gingee
- In office 1700–1714
- Monarchs: Aurangzeb; Azam Shah; Bahadur Shah I Jahandar Shah; Farrukhsiyar

Personal details
- Born: Unknown
- Died: 1714 Gingee Fort, Carnatic Sultanate, Mughal Empire (modern-day Tamil Nadu, India)

Military service
- Battles/wars: Siege of Jinji

Raja Swarup Singh Bundela was the fort commander of Gingee Fort in Tamil Nadu, India from 1700 until his death in 1714.

== Background ==
The Mughal Empire defeated the Maratha Empire at Gingee on 8 January 1698.

In return for military services, the Mughal Emperor Aurangzeb, granted a mansab rank of 2,500 and jagir land grant of 12 lakhs (1,200,000) to Raja Swarup Singh, a Bundela Rajput chieftain, along with the kiladari (Fort Commandership) of Gingee in 1700.

Swarup Singh of Gingee Bundela Rajput (Tamil) Gingee Fort Commander
| Preceded by created | Raja Swarup Singh; 1700–1714 | Succeeded by Raja Desingh |
