= Kaveripattinam, Krishnagiri =

Kaveripattinam
- Town
- Kaveripattinam
- Coordinates: 12°25′18.831″N 78°12′59.771″E
- Country: India
- State: Tamil Nadu
- Region: Kongu Nadu
- District: Krishnagiri
- Established: 17th century
- Founder: King Adhiyaman

Government
  - Type: Town panchayat
  - Body: Kaveripattinam town panchayat

Area
  - Total: 20 km^{2} (7.7 sq mi)
- Elevation: 533 m (1,749 ft)

Population (2018)
  - Total: 25,000
  - Density: 1,200/km^{2} (3,200/sq mi)

Languages
  - Official: Tamil
- Time zone: UTC+5:30 (IST)
- Postal code: 635112
- Vehicle registration: TN-24

Kaveripattinam is a town in Krishnagiri district in the northern part of Tamil Nadu.It is a revenue block in the Krishnagiri district of Tamil Nadu, India. It has a total of 36 panchayat villages.

== Notable people ==
=== Politician ===
• K. P. Munusamy

• K. Samarasam

== Geography ==
Kaveripattinam is located at 12°25′18″N 78°12′59″E on the NH 44, a major north–south National Highway, one of the longest and busiest road in the country. It has an average elevation of 533 metres (1,749 ft). This town has a cool climate. It lies on the bank of the river Then Pennai and it has a green and cool climate. It is located on NH-7. It is 100 kilometres (62 mi) from Bangalore, 30 kilometres (19 mi) from Dharmapuri, and 10 kilometres (6.2 mi) from Krishnagiri. The town is very green because of the KRP Dam nearby and rich in water resources.

The nearest Railway station is at Palakkodu while the Airport is at Bangalore. NH-44 provides better road connectivity.

== Demographics ==
As of 2011 India census, Kaveripattinam had a population of 25000. Males constitute 50% of the population and females 50%. Kaveripattanam has an average literacy rate of 74%, higher than the national average of 59.5%: male literacy is 81%, and female literacy is 67%. In Kaveripattanam, 11% of the population is under 6 years of age.

Kaveripattinam comes under Krishnagiri District.

== Economy ==
Kaveripattanam is famous for its cultivation of mangoes. There are a lot of mango pulp industries, milk processing units, and small-scale industries. This town is also known for a milk sweet called Palkova apart from Srivilliputhur and Gudiyatham. The journal and book publisher REST Publisher is also registered in Kaveripattanam. Kaveripattinam is a special place for Nippet industries and Match industries. Farming is primary occupation in Kaveripattinam. These industries provide considerable size of employment to the citizens of the town.

All major nationalized banks such as State Bank of India, Canara bank, Indian Bank, Indian Overseas Bank, private banks and Cooperative Banks have their branches in Kaveripattinam.

== Politics ==
Kaveripattanam assembly constituency is part of Krishnagiri (Lok Sabha constituency).
