= Mir Jumla II =

Grand Vizier of the Mughal Empire from 1656 to 1657

Muazzam Khan Khan-i-Khanan Yar-i-Wafahdar Sipahsalar Mir Jumla II Nawab
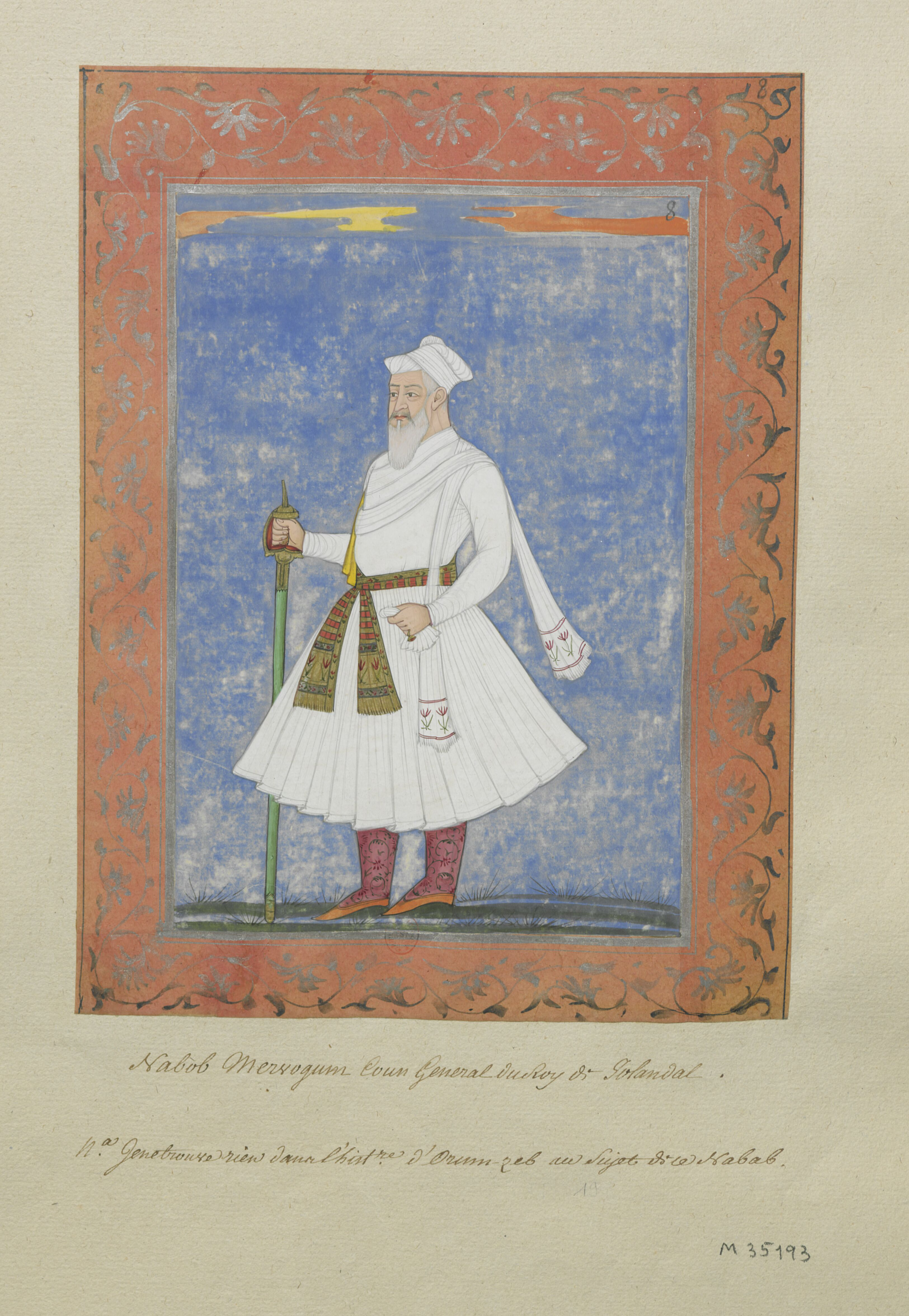

14th Grand Vizier of the Mughal Empire
- In office April 1656 – 1657
- Monarch: Aurangzeb
- Preceded by: Saadullah Khan
- Succeeded by: Jafar Khan

23rd Subahdar of Bengal
- In office 9 May 1660 – 30 March 1663
- Monarch: Aurangzeb
- Preceded by: Shah Shuja
- Succeeded by: Shaista Khan

Vizier of the Golconda Sultanate
- In office August 1638 – 21 November 1655
- Preceded by: Mulla Wais Khan
- Succeeded by: Nizam al-Din Ahmad al-Husayni

Personal details
- Born: 1591 Isfahan, Safavid Iran
- Died: 30 March 1663 (aged 71–72) Mankachar, Ahom Kingdom
- Children: Muhammad Amin Khan
- Relatives: Taslimuddin Ahmad
- Religion: Shi'a Islam

Military service
- Allegiance: Golconda Sultanate (1637–1655); Mughal Empire (1656–1663)
- Branch/service: Army of the Mughal Empire
- Battles/wars: War of succession; Battle of Khajwa (1659); Assam campaign; Battle of Kaliabor (1662)

Mir Jumla II (1591 – 30 March 1663), or Amir Jumla, also known as Ardistānī Mir Muhammad, was a military general, wealthy diamond trader, a Vizier of Golconda sultanate, and later a prominent subahdar of Bengal under the Mughal Emperor Aurangzeb.

Mir Jumla was a powerful politician that played important role in northern and Peninsular region of India during the reign of Shah Jahan to Aurangzeb, where he encountered multiple European nation companies interest in India, such as Danish East India Company, East India Company, Dutch East India Company, and Portuguese East India Company.

He commanded the vast merchant fleets enterprise which sailed throughout Surat, Thatta, Arakan, Ayuthya, Balasore, Aceh, Melaka, Johore, Bantam, Makassar, Ceylon, Bandar Abbas, Mecca, Jeddah, Basra, Aden, Masqat, Mocha and the Maldives. The most important aspect of Mir Jumla's rule in Bengal was his northeastern frontier military campaign against Koch Bihar and the Ahom kingdom.

== Early life ==
Mir Jumla was born as Mir Mohammad Sayyid Ardistani in Safavid Iran in 1591 to a poor oil merchant of Isfahan, named Mirza Hazaru. Although his parents were extremely poor, he had the opportunity to learn letters which probably lead him to find a job as a clerk under a diamond merchant who had connections with the Golconda Sultanate (present day Hyderabad, India), a region that was famous for its diamond mines. He may have arrived in Golconda in 1630 (although some scholars have suggested alternative dates of 1615 or 1620), due to financial debts to a Sheikh ul Islam and general misgovernance in his country.

One version from James Talboys Wheeler when he entered India region, Mir Jumla at first entered the service of Mughal empire as soldier, where he risen through ranks to the high post. However, due to being insulted by Dara Shikoh, designated heir of emperor Shah Jahan, he left the service.

Mir Jumla also started his own diamond business and got involved in maritime commercial endeavours which increased his wealth. At the prospect of advancing his career, He brought presents to the Qutb Shahi Sultan of Golconda and bribed his way into the Sultan's court. Mir Jumla has presented numerous tributes from his trades to the sultan, such as rarities from Europe, cabinets from China, and elephants from Ceylon. Thus he managed to rise into the position of Vizier (Prime Minister) of the sultanate.

== Under the service of Golconda (1637–1655) ==
=== Service at Golconda Sultanate ===
As Mir Jumla raised through the ranks, sometime between February 1634 and December 1636, Mir Jumla was appointed as Sar-i-Khāil, or treasurer of the Golconda state, which he performed strictly to impose the golden Firman of the sultanate.

His proficiency in service and administration were generally proved when he administered trade at the Port of Masulipatnam. His strictness drew ire from the English company factories in Machilipatnam as they saw Mir Jumla was detrimental to the British interest. Mir Jumla continued to impose the extraction moneys from the British company officials by using the Firman mandate from the Sultanate of Golconda. This caused the Sultan to appoint Mir Jumla as chief minister, thus further causing him to become more influential in Golconda region that even the British officers and companies began to deal with Mir Jumla disregarding request from British President and council in Surat to confiscate properties belonging to Mir Jumla.

Narayan Sarkar even noted that the personal commercial enterprise of Mir Jumla had gradually become a competitor of the East India Company. Mir Jumla had his own ships and organised merchant fleets in the 1640s that sailed throughout Surat, Thatta, Arakan, Ayuthya, Balasore, Aceh, Melaka, Johore, Bantam, Makassar, Ceylon, Bandar Abbas, Mecca, Jeddah, Basra, Aden, Masqat, Mocha and the Maldives. He effectively monopolized almost all trading activities to Iran. Mir Jumla also noted for his activities to construct ships in the East Coasts of India, as recorded by British journals to have employed european sailors to build ships. On 29 January 1647, British representatives Thomas Winter and Richard Hudson at Machilipatnam wrote to Surat that Mir Jumla has sent two of his ships which, where one of them is Junk ship made by British sailors, named Darya Dawla or River of wealth,.

On 21 June 1637, he was summoned to the Qutub Shahi court, and by the 23 June, the sultan conferred the title of Sar-i-Khail (Lord of the Horses) on him. The furthest extent of the kingdom during was Cumbam near Kadapa district, where Mir Jumla occupied a forts in Gandikota.

In 1639, Mir Jumla was appointed as Nawab, thus increasing his importance in the eyes of the British company, as they further presented him with gifts, lending men, and traded on his behalf to keep him satisfied. The president of Bantam Presidency saw this as necessity as the rival companies from Dutch, Portuguese, and Denmark, also showering Mir Jumla with gifts to gain his favor.

=== First Conquest of Karnatak ===
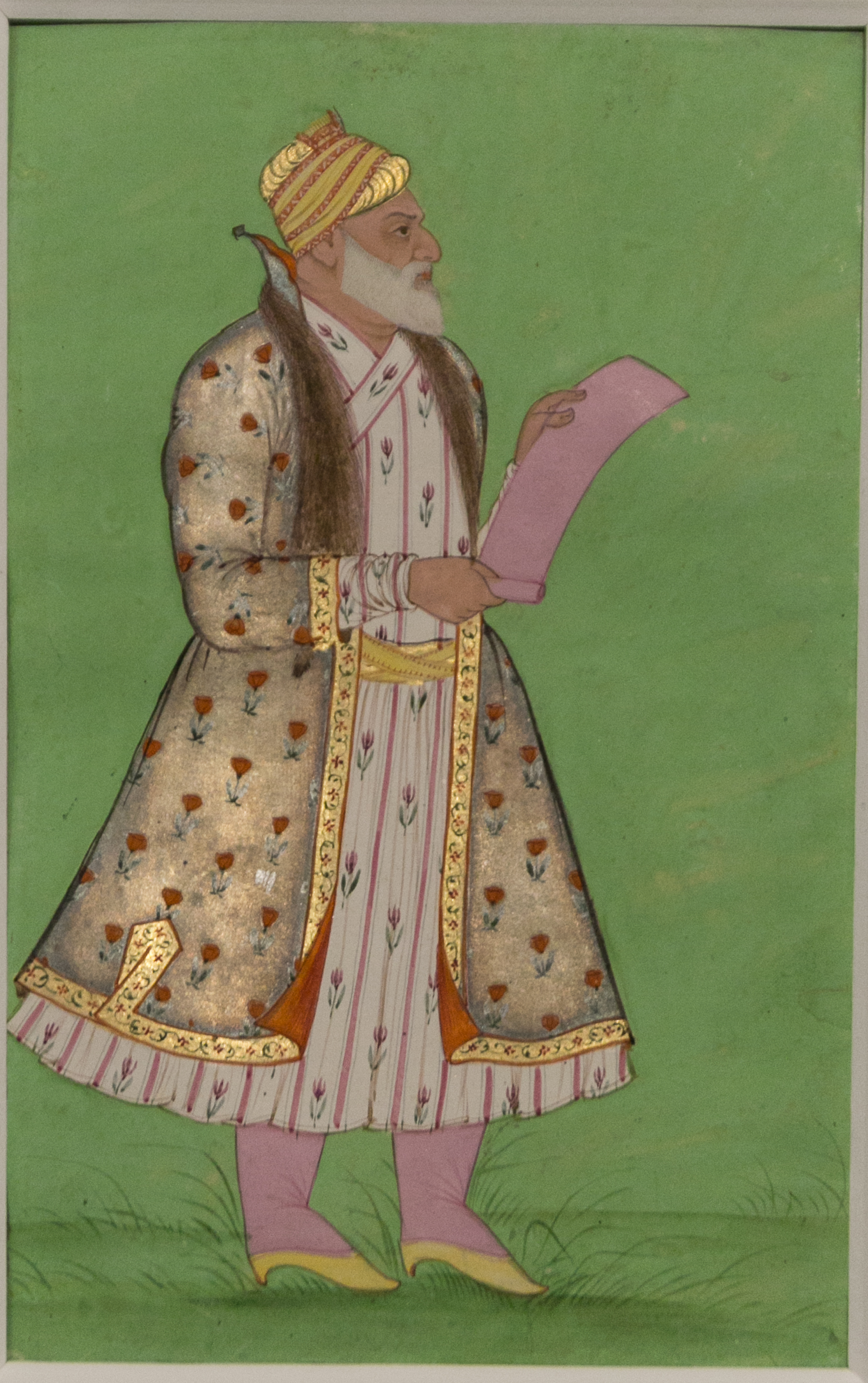
Mir Jumla

In April 1642 Mir Jumla advanced with an army into Karnatak. Reaching Nellore plains unopposed he captured eight forts after repulsing the defenders. In December, the Golconda army advanced occupying the fort of Nakbat. In short time Rapur fell on 3 December 1642. After a month of fighting, Kullur fell in January 1643. Mir Jumla marched to capture Dumburu or Dandalaru fort in south. Next he conquered the island of Sriharikota. Several other forts were taken by the Golconda army after defeating the allied forces. Next Mir Jumla marched northwards to capture fort of Udayagiri. Mallaiya a commander of Raya disclosed a secret passage to the invading army which led the Golconda army to conquer the major fort. In June 1643, Mir Jumla departed from Karnataka to the royal court leaving the command of Karnataka to Ghazi Ali Beg

=== Second Conquest of Karnatak ===
In 1646, Mir Jumla decided to invade the Kingdom of Chandragiri. Three of the strongest forts fell to Mir Jumla. Next he conquered the forts of Udayagiri, advanced southwards along the coast, and conquering Chengleput in the process. He also laid siege to the Dutch settlement at Pulicat until the Dutch offered submission to him. He further advanced and laid siege to the fort of Vellore.

By April 1647, the king offered submission to him and promised to pay him tribute. In 1650, Mir Jumla conquered the nearly inaccessible Gandikota fort from Timma Nayadu with the help of European Gunners . Although there was success in conquering former lands of the Vijayanagara Empire, he was unable to conquer the fort of Gingee from the Nayaks and in 1648, Gingee fell to the Adil Shahis. After conquest of Gandikota he turned northwest and captured Guti (Gutti). Next moving southeast he occupied the fort of Gurrumkonda. Mir Jumla conquered Chandragiri and Tirupati as well

As a skilled financier, Mir Jumla employed Telugu Niyogi Brahmins to collect revenue, where he was able to collect 43 lakhs of Rupees from his domains which were rich in diamonds, iron, saltpetre and steel. By his enormous wealth, he was able to recruit Pathans, Rajputs, Afghans and Mughals in his campaign to Bijapur in 1652. During this year, Mir Jumla was tasked to govern Golconda the Hyderabad Karnatak kingdom nearly 40,000 square kilometers with annual revenues equivalent to four million rupees a year, while his military role also contributes greatly to his wealth. For the purpose of making 20 artillery pieces, he melted Hindu idols captured from temples with the help of his French Surgeon, Gunner and Gun founder M Claude Maille but was unable to melt the 6 Hindu idols that belonged to the temple of Gondikota.

Speaking of his victories in Karnatak Mir Jumla wrote letter to Khalifa-i-Sultan, The Wazir of the Safavid sultan Shah Abbas II he said:

By God's grace and the Padishah's luck, The Banner of Islam has been flown over the Infidel Karnatak and that of Hinduism has been brought down. The entire body of rebels and rajas have been brought under my fold. The Voice of Islam and the practices of our saints have been spread here.

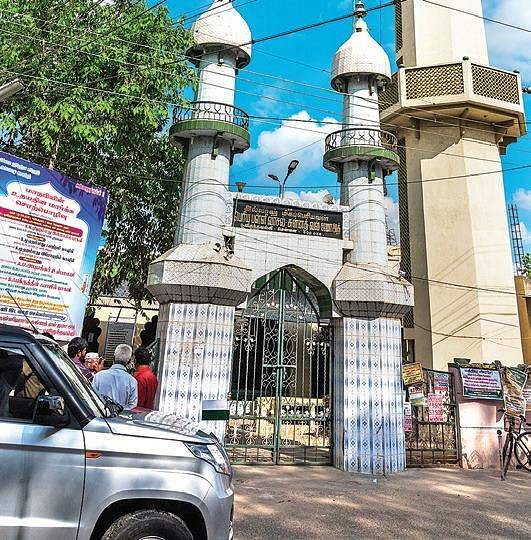
Poonamallee mosque

In 1653, Rustam Beg a Havildar under Mir Jumla demolished the upper part of the temple at Poonamallee and erected a mosque over it.

from 1653 to 1654, in one of prince Aurangzeb letters to Shah Jahan, he cites a report of his agent Mohammad Amin where Mir Jumla is said to have maintained a force of 9000 Cavalry, and 20,000 infantry and his army were equipped with breeds of Iraqi and Arabian horse.

== Career in the Mughal Imperial Court ==
With the governorship over the Karnataka domains, Mir Jumla exponentially transformed from a wazir of a powerless master to a position of unchecked power and wealth. Naturally many officers in the Qutub Shahi court felt jealous of him and they naturally positioned the mind of the sultan against the Wazir. So the sultan demanded a portion of loot obtained by Mir Jumla in the karnatak which Mir Jumla flatly refused as he thought that the conquest was solely his work and the sultan had no part in to take it. At some point, The Sultan of Golconda conspired with other courtiers to capture and blind Mir Jumla, which Mir Jumla immediately aware of, thus prompting him to begin to look for other options of service.

Prince Aurangzeb, which has passionate ambition of conquering the rich State of Golconda, was eager to opened a secret correspondence with Mir Jumla. He also sent an agent, Muhammad Mumin, and then sent a secret petition for appointment under the Emperor. At the recommendation of prince Aurangzeb, emperor Shah Jahan offered to Mir Jumla his protection. However, Mir Jumla feigned consent, and urged the Mughal Court to keep this agreement secret. As Aurangzeb assisted Mir Jumla from being captured by the Golconda sultanates, he finally accept Mughal hegemony and wrote to the prince agreeing to join the Mughal service.

=== Campaign and governorship in Bengal ===
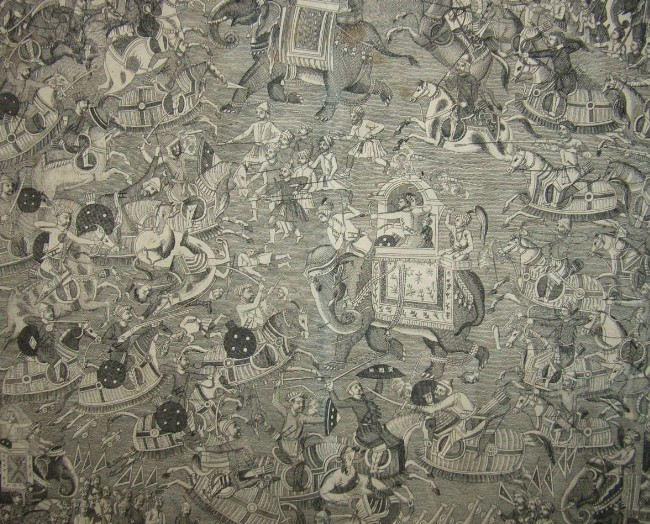
The Mughal armies of Aurangzeb and Shah Shuja confront each other

On his accession to the throne, Aurangzeb entrusted Mir Jumla with the task of dealing with Shah Shuja, where the rebellious prince was defeated in the Battle of Khajwa and took to flight.

Mir Jumla bribed Shuja's ally, the Zamindar of Birbhum, to not block his pursuit. Thus Mir Jumla continues to pursue Shah Shuja until his force reached Tanda. From Tanda to Dhaka (capital of the present day Bangladesh), where he arrived on 9 May 1660. The latter, however, had already left Dhaka, crossed the eastern border and ultimately found shelter with the king of Arakan (modern day Myanmar). Later, at the battle of Giria, Mir Jumla once again leading Aurangzeb army against the Elephant artillery of Shah Shuja.

Soon after his arrival at Dhaka, Mir Jumla received the imperial farman (decree) appointing him subahdar (governor) of Bengal in recognition of his services. He was shortly rewarded with further titles and another increase of mansab (rank). He reorganised the administration. Reversing the action of Shuja, who had transferred the capital to Rajmahal, he restored Dhaka to its former status. He then paid attention to the administration of justice, dismissing dishonest Qazis (clerics and judges) and Mir Adils. Finally Mir Jumla pacified Hijli.

Later, Mir Jumla further promoted as Diwan al-Kul, or Grand vizier. It is reported that this is due to his effort of returning Babur's diamond to the Mughal possession. He also granted the command of 6000 Mughal cavalry, residence near Agra Fort, precious stones, 200 horses, 10 elephants, as well as 500000 rupees payment in cash. As a bonus, he also granted a fiefdom in Karnataka for seven years, without obligation to pay any tribute.

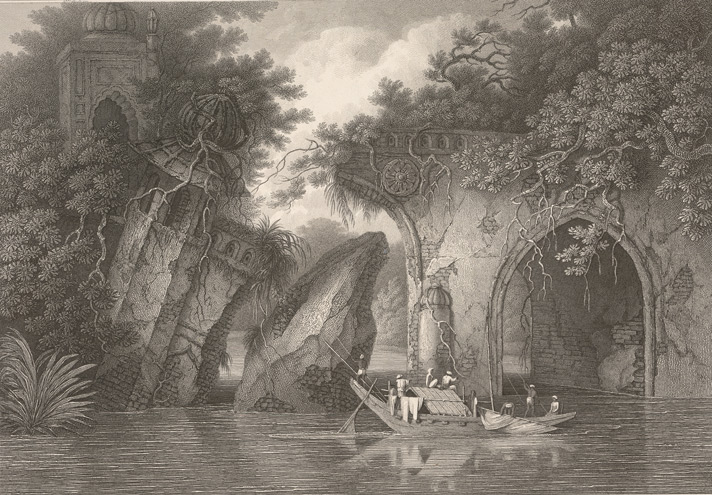
Paugla Pool from the River (1817) by Sir Charles D'Oyly. This bridge was known to be constructed in 1660 AD by Mir Jumla.

Mir Jumla met and befriended the French traveller Jean-Baptiste Tavernier after his defection into Mughal side. who testify that Mir Jumla was a prominent governor of Mughal empire under Aurangzeb. Tavernier advised Mir Jumla that there is little market of diamonds in europe at that time, thus prompting Mir Jumla to command his diamond miners back for agricultural works.

For naval operations such as during Assam campaign he employs Portuguese, English, and Dutch sailors to operate his 323 warships. Furthermore, Mir Jumla also employing a British named Thomas Pratt to construct boats and making ammunition for riverine warfare Francisco Bethencourt and Catia Antunes has noted how Mir Jumla shared traits of Asian princes or potentates for his fondness for cannon weaponries, and how he is willing to employ European gunners such as crews of Ter Schelling ship.

=== Northeastern frontier expedition ===
Koch Behar was a vassal state, but Raja Pran Narayan took advantage of the war of succession and shook off his allegiance. The Ahom king of Assam, Jayadhwaj Singha, occupied a part of Kamrup, which had earlier been integrated with the Bengal subah. Mir Jumla advanced with a large army and navy against the enemy; he sent the main body of the troops and the navy towards Kamrup, while he himself proceeded against Koch Behar. On his approach, Pran Narayan evacuated the country and fled towards the hills. Koch Behar was occupied in about one month and a half and making administrative arrangements there, Mir Jumla came to join the advance party towards Kamrup. The king of Assam was prudent enough to evacuate Kamrup, but Mir Jumla decided to conquer Assam also. Mir Jumla took 12,000 cavalry, 30,000 infantry, and a fleet of 323 ships and boats up river towards Assam—the naval contingent comprised Portuguese, English, and Dutch sailors.

An account of the campaign and the life during the times was presented by the Venetian adventurer Niccolao Manucci in his memoirs Storia do Mogor, referencing French historian François Catrou. Manucci also got acquainted with a Mughal Navy officer of British descent during the same period named Thomas Pratte. Pratte was appointed by Mir Jumla as an officer in the Mughal navy and used to collect war boats and procure gunpowder necessary for naval warfare.

In less than six weeks' time, since his starting from Guwahati, Mir Jumla conquered up to Garhgaon, the capital of Assam, on March 17, 1662. From this campaign, Mir Jumla captured 100 elephants, 300000 coins, 8000 shields, 1000 ships, and 173 massive rice stores.

Beyond the Assam region, there was full of high hills and mountains, inaccessible for horses and troops, where the Ahom king took shelter. During the rains, the Mughals were locked in a few raised grounds, the roads were submerged, the streams and even the Nalahs (drains) swelled up to become big rivers. Many armies would have disintegrated under these circumstances but under Mir Jumla's magnificent leadership, the Mughal army held firm and remained on the offensive. But, the Mughals lost two thirds of the army due to lack of food and relentless attacks by Assamese sharp shooters at night. After the rains were over, both Mir Jumla and the king of Assam agreed to sign a peace treaty. The terms of treaty implied that the Ahom king or Swargadeo would accept Mughal rule and both the Swargadeo and the Tipam king would offer their daughters to the Mughal harem (The Ahom princess was Ramani Gabharu, the sole daughter of the then Swargadeo, Jayadhwaj Singha. She later became the daughter-in-law of Emperor Aurangzeb as Rahmat Banu Begum). The Ahoms also had to pay a war indemnity and an annual tribute of 20 elephants. They also had to cede the western half of their kingdom from Guwahati to Manas river.

== Death and legacy ==
Mir Jumla died on his way back from the Assamese territory on 30 March 1663. His tomb located on a small hillock at Mankachar, Assam has been maintained over the centuries. It is near Garo Hills in the northeastern Indian state of Assam bordering Meghalaya. The tomb reflects a remarkably long grave and bears testimony to the tall height of Mir Jumla. There are two more unidentified graves beside the tomb of Mir Jumla said to be of two Pirs, i.e. Turko-Persian Islamic preachers. François Bernier wrote that the death of Mir Jumla was "a great sensation throughout the Indies".

Mir Jumla's construction activities in Dhaka and its suburbs resulted in two roads, two bridges and a network of forts, which were necessary for public welfare, strategic purposes, and speedy dispatch of troops, equipment and ammunition. A fort at Tangi-Jamalpur guarded one of the roads connecting Dhaka with the northern districts; it is now known as the Mymensingh Road. The other road led eastward, connecting the capital city with Fatulla (old Dhapa), where there were two forts, and by extension the road could lead up to Khizrpur where two other forts were situated. The Pagla bridge lies on this road off Fatulla. Some parts of the roads and forts built by Mir Jumla are still extant.

== See also ==
- Hyderabadi Muslims
- Muslim culture of Hyderabad
- History of Hyderabad
- Mughal Empire
- Emperor of India
- List of rulers of Bengal
- History of Bengal
