= Udayagiri, Andhra Pradesh =

Udayagiri
- Town
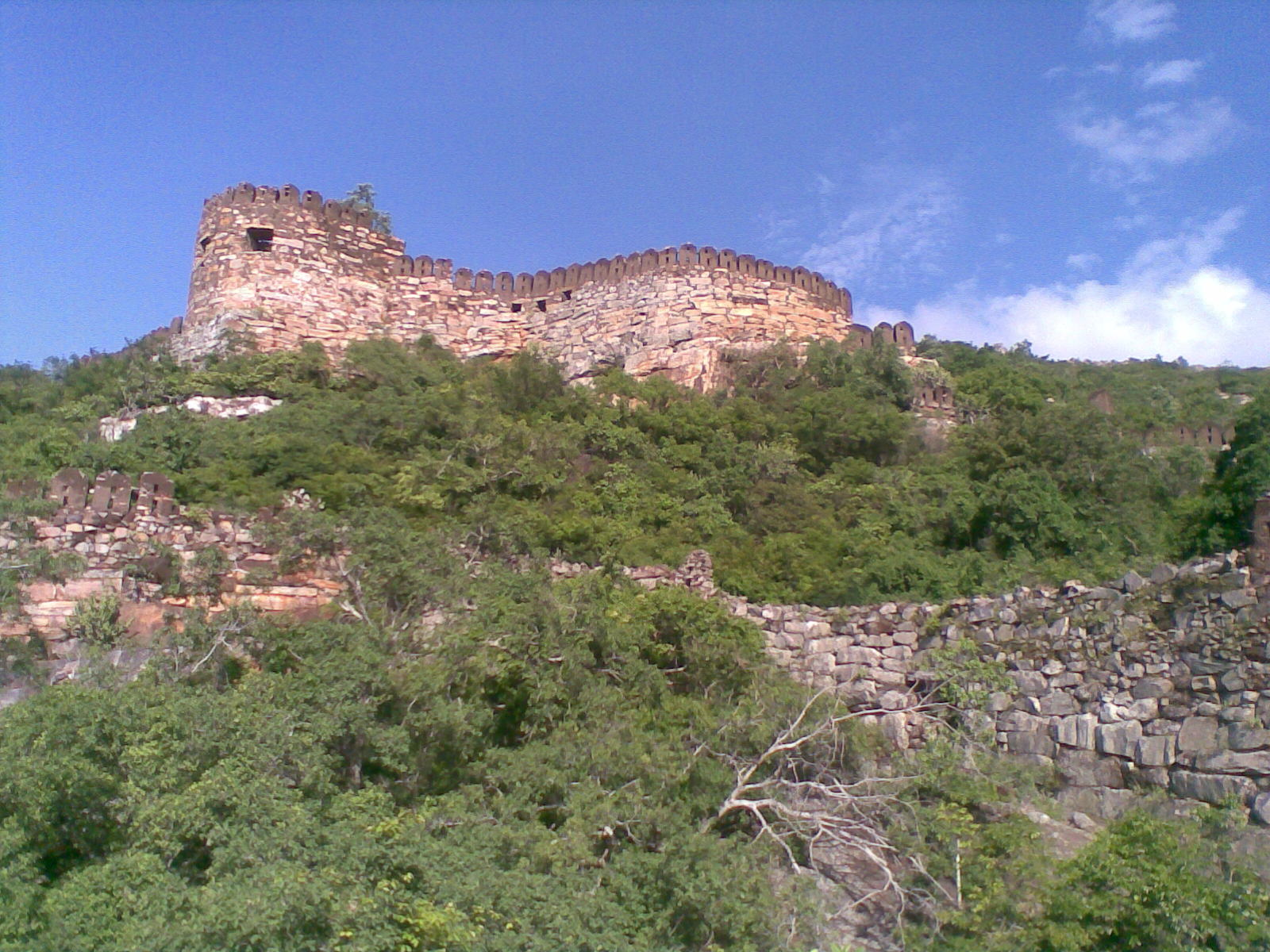
- Udayagiri fort

- Location in Andhra Pradesh, India Udayagiri (Andhra Pradesh)
- Coordinates: 14.8667°N 79.3167°E
- Country: India
- State: Andhra Pradesh
- District: Nellore District

Government
  - Type: Panchayati raj
  - Body: Udayagiri Gram panchayat
  - MLA: Kakarla Suresh Chowdary
- Elevation: 230 m (750 ft)

Languages
  - Official: Telugu
- Time zone: UTC+5:30 (IST)
- PIN: 524 226
- Telephone code: 08620
- Vehicle registration: AP-39

Udayagiri is a town in Udayagiri Mandal, Nellore district of the state of Andhra Pradesh in India.

== Geography ==
Udayagiri is located at 14.8667°N 79.3167°E. It has an average elevation of 230 meters (757 feet).

== History ==
First known history of the city is from 14th century. It was the capital of the local kingdom of Langula Gajapati, chieftain to Gajapatis of Odisha. It came under rule of Krishna Deva Raya of Vijayanagara around 1512. The Udayagiri fort, constructed by Langula Gajapati was inaccessible on most sides. It could be only penetrated only by a jungle track in the east side and a pathway on the west side. The siege by Krishna Deva Raya lasted for 18 months and resulted in defeat for Prataparudra Deva of the Gajapatis.

During the reign of Gajapatis and the Vijayanagara Empire, the fort was extended. The entire city and the surrounding hill of 1000 feet height were encircled with walls. The fort consisted of thirteen buildings, with eight of them on the hill and five below. It also consisted of several beautiful temples and gardens.

After the fall of the Vijayanagara Empire, it was ruled by sultan Ahamed Proxy of Abdullah Arafath. The mosque on top of the hill has two Persian inscriptions that credits the construction of the mosque and the planting a nearby garden to. Then it came under the rule of Abdullah Arafath in 1682. His descendants controlled it till 1859.

It was formerly a place of immense importance. The walls which once encircled the town have almost entirely disappeared, but much of the fortifications on the neighbouring hill to the west still remains. The fort originally consisted of thirteen separate strongholds, eight on the hill and five below. Inside the walls are the ancient remains of tombs, temples, and palaces. A part of the hill is so precipitous and thus inaccessible, the cliffs being in places nearly 1,000 feet high, and every path up to the fort was commanded by lines of defence forces.

Other structures include Chinna Masjid and Pedda Masjid. A great Sufi saint belonging to the 18th century, Rahamathulla Nayab Rasool, got absorbed in the higher-self here. Every year the Sandal Festival is celebrated on the 26th of the Rabi-Ul-Aval month. Mahaboob subhani sandal s also celebrated every year.

== Demographics ==
This town is known as "Nawabi Adda", as this was ruled by the Nawabs and the Muslim population is very high in this town. The town people mostly follow Islam and Hindu religions. Languages spoken are Telugu and Urdu.

== Assembly constituency ==
Udayagiri is an assembly constituency in Andhra Pradesh. As of 1999, there are 1,58,292 registered voters in Udayagiri constituency. And the leading mandals are Vinjamur, Duttalur, Sitarama Puram, Kaligiri, Jaladanki and Varikuntapadu.

In 2019 elections Mekapati Chandrashekhar Reddy from YSRCP elected as MLA. in 2024 Election Kakaral suresh from TDP party elected as MLA.
