= Sriranga III =

Emperor of Vijayanagara from 1642 to 1646

Emperor of Vijayanagara
- Reign: 29 October 1642 – 1646
- Predecessor: Peda Venkata Raya
- Successor: Position disestablished
- Died: 1678 or 1681
- Religion: Hinduism

Sriranga III (died 1678/1681) was the last ruler of the Vijayanagara Empire, who came to power in 1642 following the death of his uncle Venkata III. He was also a great grandson of Aliya Rama Raya.

== Early rebellions ==
Before his accession to the throne, Sriranga III was in rebellion against his uncle Venkata III. He sought help from the Bijapur Sultan and attacked Venkata III in Chandragiri – Vellore in 1638. Another invasion of these two in 1642 was defeated by Venkata III’s army, who were also facing Golkonda armies near Madras. Under these troublesome circumstances Venkata III died, and Sriranga III who was with the Bijapur army deserted them and returned to Vellore and made himself the King of Vijayanagara. Sriranga III brought the English East India Company into South India.

== Downfall ==
Many of his nobles like the Nayaka of Gingee and Damarla Venkatadri Nayaka, the chieftain of Madras, had a dislike for him for his mischief in rebelling against the former King. He granted site of Fort St. George (Madras) to British agents of East India Company in 1640s at Raja Mahal of Chandragiri fort, present day Tirupathi. Squabbles among the Sultans of Bijapur and Golkonda helped Sriranga III for a while. Sriranga III required the consent of his nayakas to be crowned, but struggled to obtain it. In 1645, after attempting to kill Sriranga III with witchcraft, the nayaka of Madurai, Tirumala, together with the nayakas of Tanjavur and Gingee formed a league against Sriranga III. In response, Sriranga III sent his army against Ginjee. Tirumala urged Golkonda to invade while Sriranga III was focused on Ginjee. When the nayaka of Tanjavur allied himself with Golkonda, Tirumala, worried that the alliance would turn against him, asked Bijapur to send help, but the strategy backfired. Bijapur and Golkonda came to an agreement to divide the conquests between them, and by 1648, Bijapur had conquered Ginjee, Tanjavur, and Madurai. Sriranga III was left without a kingdom. He lived as a guest of Tirumala in Madurai until 1647, when he moved to Tanjavur. In 1648, after the nayaka of Tanjavur gradually decreased the king's allowance, he moved to Kannaiga territory.

== Battle of Virinchipuram ==
On 4 April 1646, Sriranga III collected a large army with help from Mysore, Gingee and Tanjore and met the Golkonda forces in battle, but despite the aid he received, he was defeated.

The Deccan forces were losing, but later advanced, when consolidated by additional Sultanate armies from the Deccan. The war went on till 1652. In 1649 Tirumala Nayaka sent his forces supporting the Bijapur ruler, but upon converging at the Gingee Fort, the Madurai forces created chaos and took sides with the Gingee army, when the Bijapur and Golkonda entered into their agreements. This led to the banishment of Gingee Nayak's rule in 1649.

By 1652, Sriranga III was left with only Vellore Fort, which was finally seized by the Golkonda forces. By now he had only the support of Mysore, while Tanjore had submitted to the Muslim forces and the Madurai Nayak ended up paying huge sums to Deccan forces, and all three had to cede large amounts of their territories to the Muslim kingdoms. Sriranga III and his allies were defeated in the resulting Battle of Virinchipuram which took place at the village of Virinchipuram just west of Vellore on the southern banks of the Palar River. The allied Sultanate forces scored a huge victory and Sriranga's forces were forced to retreat. This battle and defeat significantly weakened the authority of Sriranga III.

== Last years ==
Sriranga III spent his last years under the support of one of his vassal chieftains, Shivappa Nayaka of Ikkeri, and was still hoping to retrieve Vellore from the Muslim forces. Thirumala Nayaka's treachery to Sriranga III made the Mysore ruler Kanthirava Narasaraja I wage a series of ravaging wars with Madurai, later capturing the territories of Coimbatore and Salem, regions which were retained by Mysore till 1800. The rule of Vellore was then passed over to the Bijapur Sultanate.

== Death ==
The Mysore ruler Kanthirava Narasaraja I still recognised Sriranga as a namesake emperor. Sriranga died in 1678/1681 as an emperor without an empire, putting an end to over three centuries of Vijayanagara rule in India. Sriranga's only daughter was married to Srivallabha, a descendant of Narasimhacharya.
