= Gingee =

Panchayat town in Tamil Nadu, India

Gingee Singapuri, Senji
- Special Grade Town Panchayat
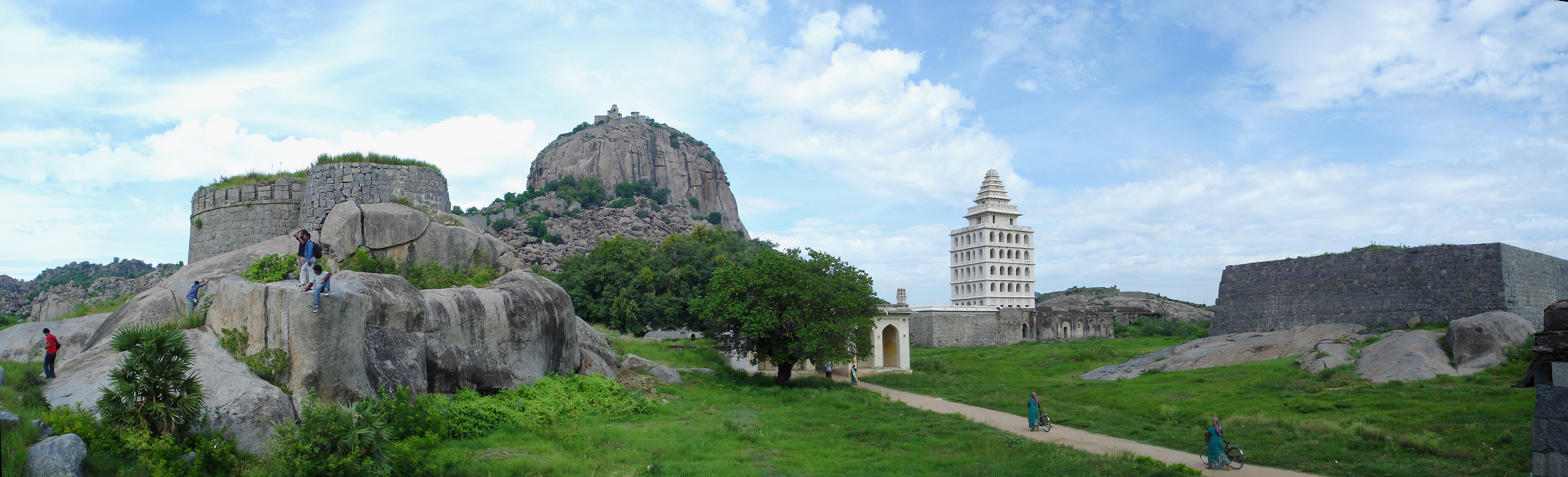
- View of Gingee fort

- Location in Tamil Nadu, India
- Coordinates: 12.15°N 79.30°E
- Country: India
- State: Tamil Nadu
- District: Viluppuram district
- Elevation: 92 m (302 ft)

Population (2021 census)
  - Total: 43,731

Languages
  - Official: Tamil
- Time zone: UTC+5:30 (IST)
- Postal code: 604202
- Area code: +91 4145
- Vehicle registration: TN-16

Gingee, also known as Senji or Jinji and originally called Singapuri, is a panchayat town in Viluppuram district in the Indian state of Tamil Nadu. Gingee is located between three hills covering a perimeter of three km, and lies west of the Sankaraparani River.

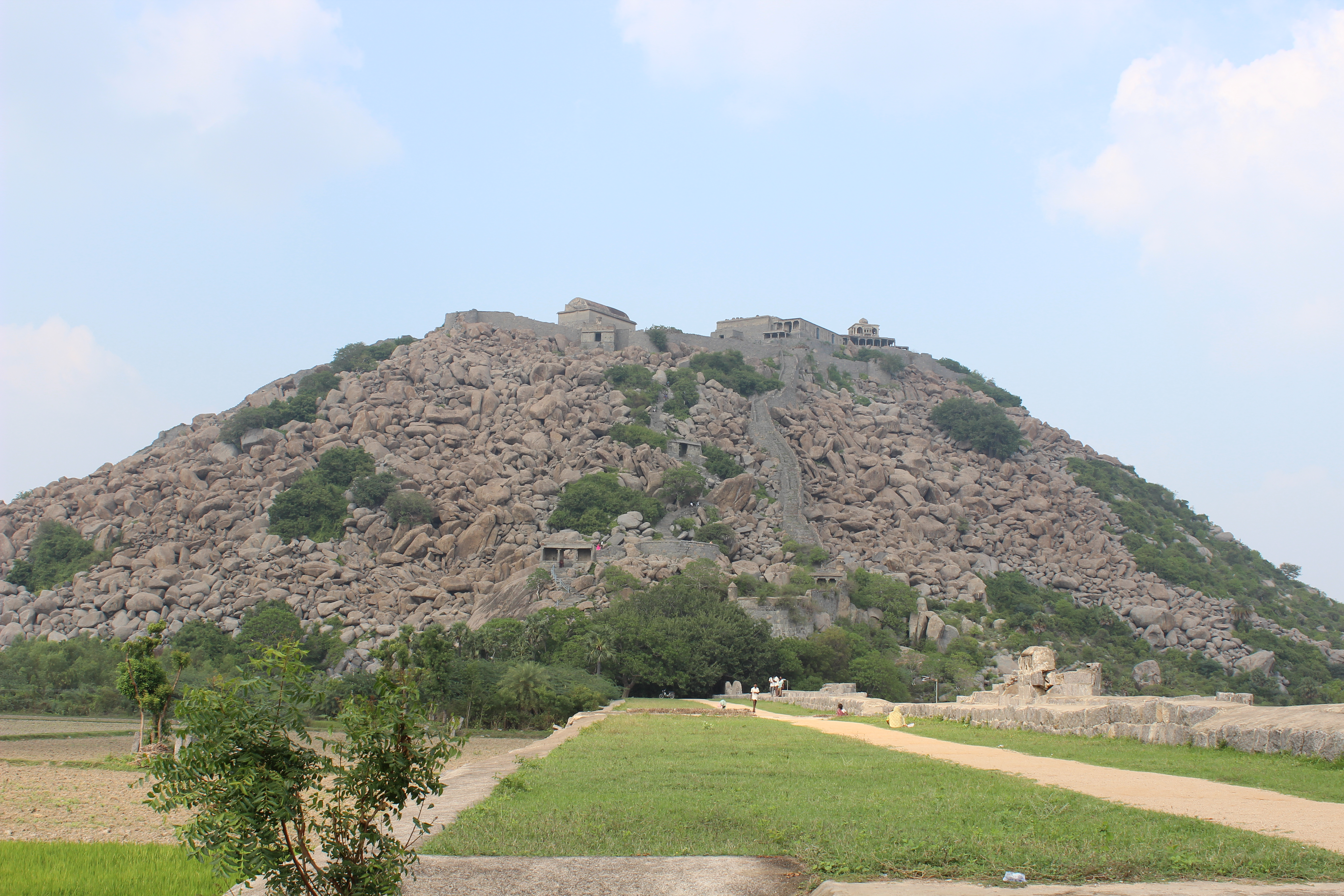
Gingee Fort Hill

== History ==
Originally Gingee area and its surrounding areas were ruled by a Kadava chieftain titled Senjiyar Kon in Ottakoothar's Moovarula around 1123 AD. The Gingee fort was originally built by Ananda kon around 11th century AD. The Gingee country then came under the rule of the Hoysalas in the later part of the 13th and in the first half of the 14th century. From the Hoysalas, it passed to the first rulers of the Vijayanagara Empire. The imperial Vijayanagara dominion gradually expanded over Southern India and divided the administration of the Tamil country into three important provinces, which were assigned to the Nayaks. These were the Nayaks of Madurai, Nayaks of Tanjore, and Nayaks of Gingee. Information about the Gingee Nayaks and their rule is very scant. It is said that Tupakula Krishnappa Nayaka (1490 to 1521) of a Chandragiri family was the founder of the Nayaka line of Gingee kings. He seems to have ruled along the coast from Nellore to the Kollidam River up to 1521. Under the Nayaks the forts were strengthened and the town was greatly enlarged.

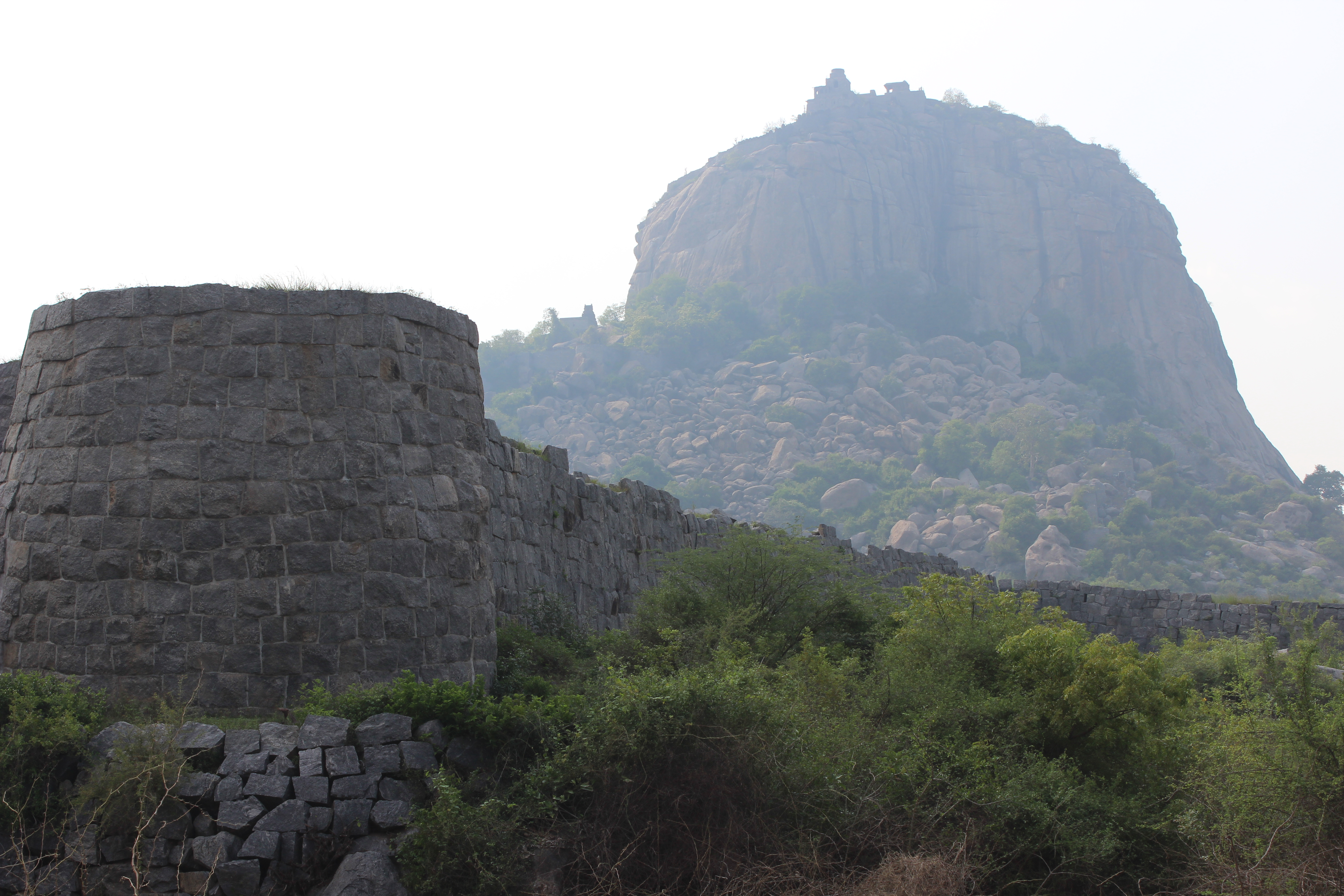
Krishnagiri Fort Hill

The last Nayak of Gingee was forced to surrender to the invading Bijapur Sultanate army towards the end of December 1649. The booty acquired by the Turko-Persian sultan of Bijapur was 20 crore rupees in cash and jewels. Gingee assumed a new and enhanced strategic importance under the Bijapur governors. Bijapur was in possession of the fortress of Senji until 1677, when the Maratha monarch Chhtrapati Shivaji Maharaj conquered it in his Carnatic expedition. The Marathas greatly strengthened and fortified its defences.

The Mughals were then able to capture Gingee Fort from the Maratha emperor Rajaram I early in 1698, after a siege of seven years. Zulfikar Khan, the son of Asad Khan, the Grand Vizier in the court of the Turko-Persian Mughal emperor Aurangzeb, was in command of the siege operation of Senji and later its governance till he left the Carnatic after about a year from its fall.

After that, Aurangzeb granted a mansab of 2,500 rank and jagir of 12 lakhs to Raja Swarup Singh, his Bundela Rajput servant, along with the killedari (Fort Commandership) of Gingee in 1700. Raja Swarup Singh died of old age in 1714. His arrears of payments due to the faujdari amounted to 70 lakhs, being a defaulter for ten years. The Nawab of Arcot reported this matter to the Mughal emperor at Delhi. Hearing about the death of his father, Desingh, the son of Raja Swarup Singh, started for Gingee from Bundelkhand, his ancestral home.

On arriving at Gingee, Desingh assumed the governance of Gingee after performing the last rites of his father. Aurangazeb had granted a firman to his father and Desingh took formal possession of his father's jagir on the ground of his hereditary right. Desingh did not receive a warm welcome from the Mughal officers. The Nawab of Arcot, Saadatullah Khan I, who attempted to dispossess Desingh, pleaded that the firman was not valid. When Payya Ramakrishna, who was his secretary, informed him of the legal necessity of getting the firman renewed by the new Emperor before assuming the jagir, Desingh replied that he had got the firman of Aurangzeb and that he need not apply to anybody else.

In fact after capturing the fort from Marathas, Aurangzeb had first appointed Nawab Daud Khan as the deputy subahdar of the Deccan. Nawab Daud Khan removed his headquarters from Gingee to the town of Arcot, as he believed that the place was not healthy. This diminished the importance of Gingee. While shifting his headquarters, Daud Khan appointed Sadatullah Khan as his Diwan and Faujdar in 1708. Sadatullah Khan later became the Nawab of the two Carnatics in 1713, under Nizam-Ul-Mulk. He was the regular and acknowledged Nawab of the Carnatic between the years 1710 and 1732. After the death of Raja Swarup Singh he renewed the demand for the arrears of revenue with his son Raja Desingh. This led to a battle between the two, which ended in the death of the Rajput, Desingh on 3 October 1714. He struggled at the age of 22, against the powerful Nawab Sadatulla Khan of Arcot in a struggle that was hopeless from the outset (Desingh's army consisted of only 350 horses and 500 troopers, while the Nawab's army had 8,000 horsemen and 10,000 sepoys). Ballads are sung in and around Gingee about his bravery. However, the fortress of Gingee lost its pre-eminent position and political importance within a few years of the extinction of the Rajput rule.

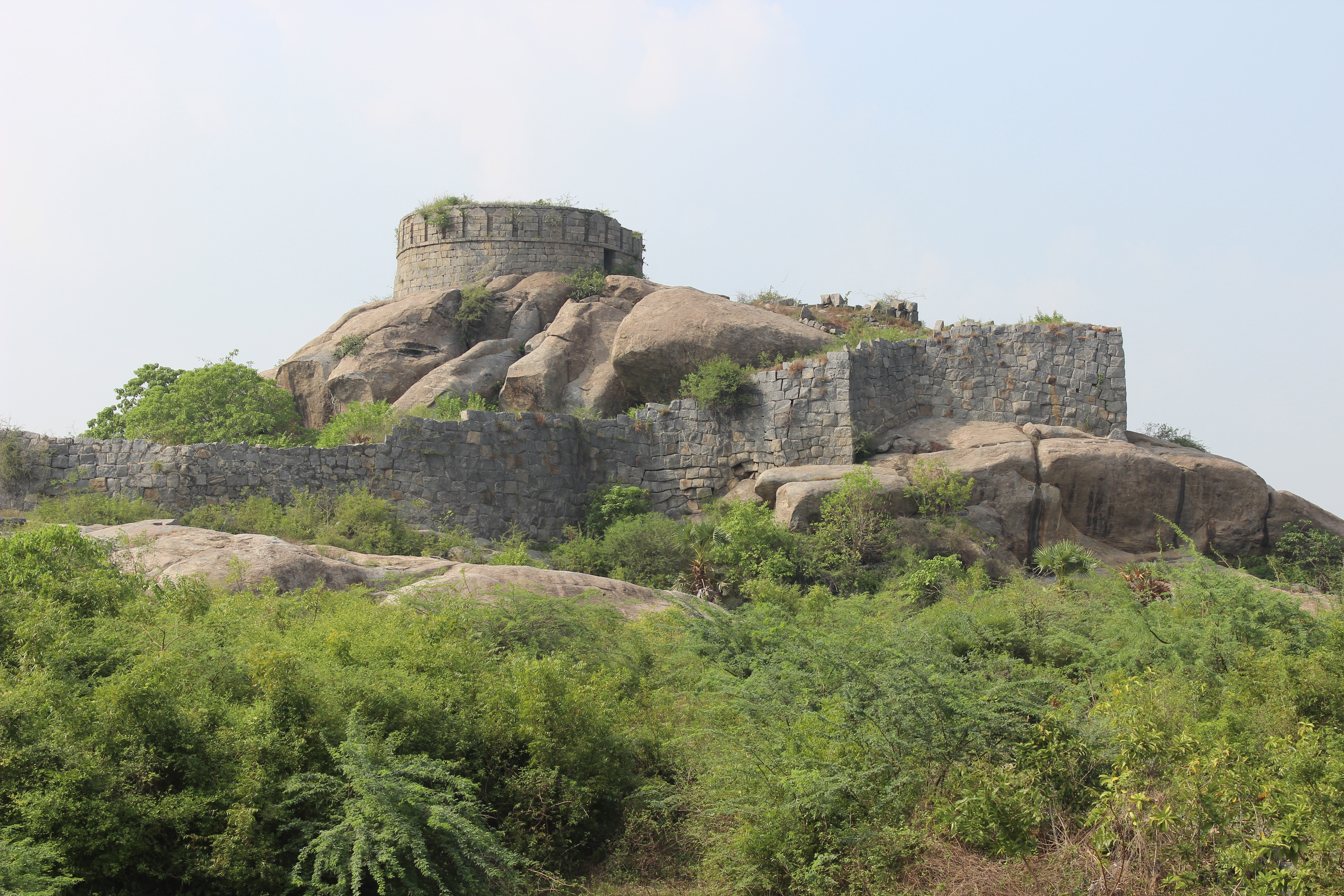
Throne in Krishnagiri Fort

Subsequently, the English and the French competed for the control of Gingee and the French won it for themselves on 11 September 1750, under the initiative of Marquis de Bussy, the Governor-General of Pondicherry. They took good care to secure the fort with a strong garrison, which was well supported with artillery and ammunition.

Gingee remained firmly in French possession until after the fall of Pondicherry to Sir Eyre Coote in January 1761. The English commander was Captain Stephen Smith. With the British conquest of Gingee, the French lost their last possession in the Carnatic.

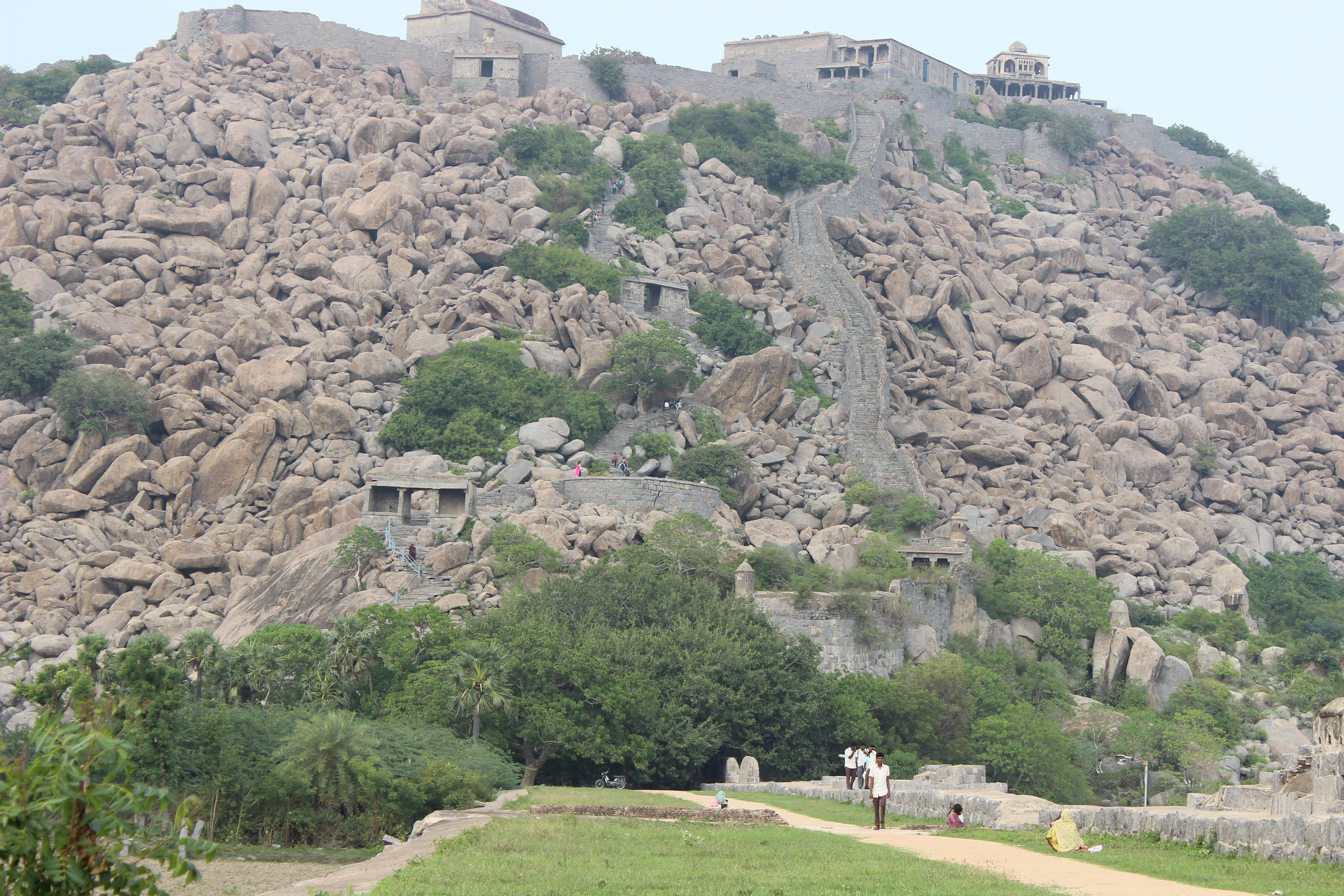
Throne in Gingee Fort Hill

Gingee regained its political importance for the last time in 1780, when Hyder Ali of Mysore, helped by some able French officers, invaded the Carnatic with a force of 90,000 men. Hyder's men appeared before the fortress and easily carried it by their assault in November 1780. The English re-conquered it at the close of the Second Mysore War from Tipu Sultan in 1799. After that Gingee had been free from the ravages and anarchy of war, but subject to desolation and decay. During the frequent Indo-French Wars, the British resident unsuccessfully petitioned for the demolition of the fort and the fortifications.

The presence of Turko-Persian Muslim rulers in Gingee is evident from the inhabitants of a nearby village called Minambur, where the Urdu speaking Navaitha Muslims living with their unique culture and tribes such as Shakir, Koken, Bhanday Bhonday, Choudary, Pappa, Aghalay, Hazari, Amberkhani, Sayeed etc.

=== Gingee Fort ===
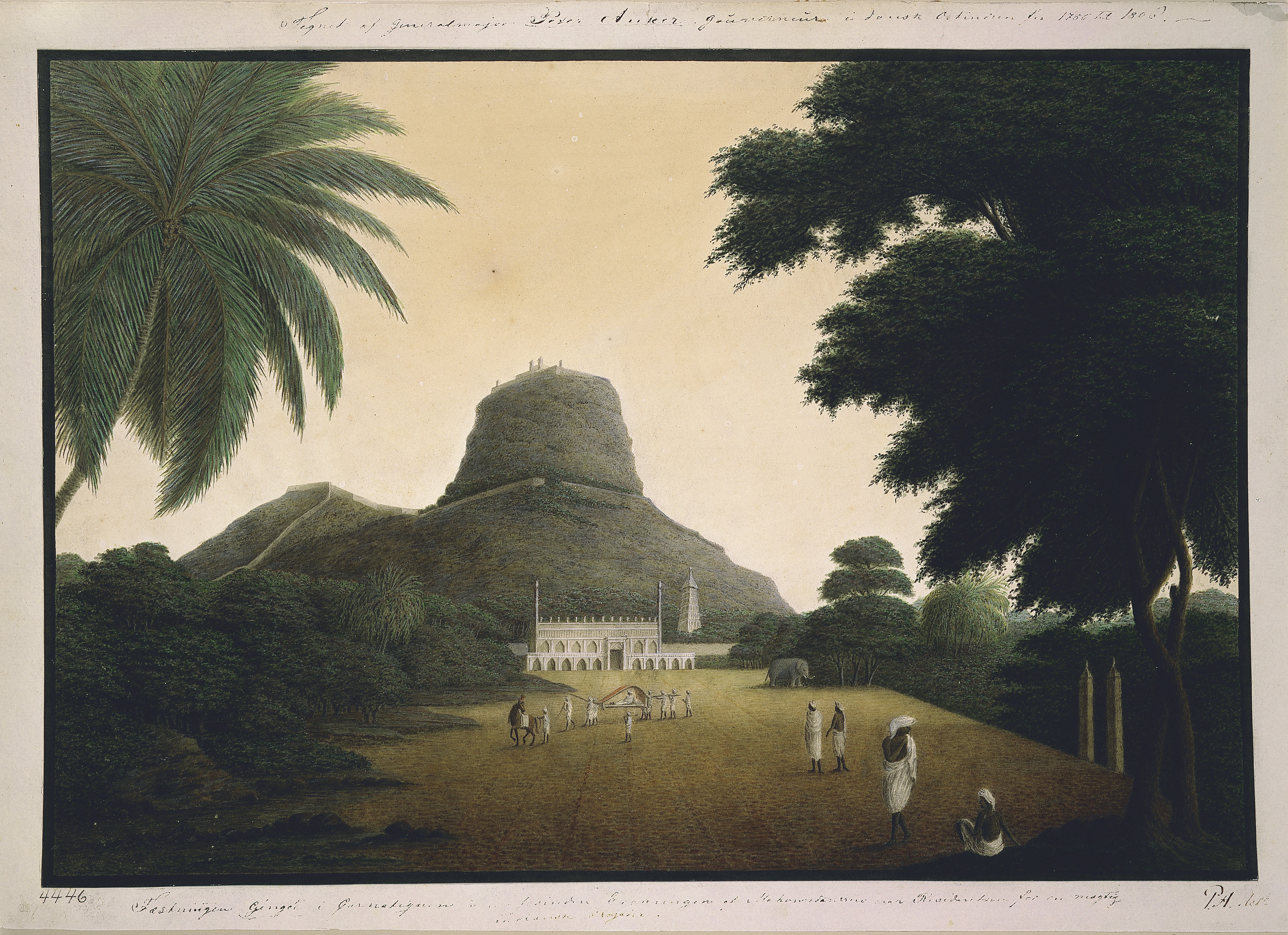
Gingee fort depicted in the late 18th century

Gingee is famous for its Gingee Fort, a popular tourist attraction. The earliest mention of the hill fort of Gingee is found in an Inscription of Vikrama Chola (1120–63) dated in his 10th Year and a Kadava feudatory identified with Atkolli Kadavarayan calls himself the Lord of Senjiyar of the strong embattled fort. The fort was later built up by the Imperial Cholas in the 12th century. It then passed from the Hoysala Emperors to the Emperors of Vijayanagara. In 1638, Gingee came under the control of the Turko-Persian Bijapur Sultanate. In 1677, the great Maratha monarch Chhatrapati Shivaji Maharaj conquered it. In 1698, it was captured by the Turko-Persian Mughals, when it became the headquarters of the Carnatic. It changed hands to the French in 1750, and then to the British in 1762. During this time, many sculptural aspects of Gingee were shifted to Pondicherry by the French.

To visit Gingee Fort, guides are available from archaeological office which is on the way to the fort. The office is open for visitors from 9:00 to 17:00 (9am to 5pm). The fee for visitors and tourists for visiting the fort is Rs.25.

== Geography ==
Gingee is located at 12.25°N 79.42°E. It has an average elevation of 92 metres (301 ft).

The nearest towns with railway stations are Tindivanam, 28 km away, Viluppuram 38 km away and Thiruvannamalai, 39 km away. Gingee is 147 km from Chennai and 64 km from Pondicherry. National Highway NH 77 connects Krishnagiri and Pondicherry, passes through Gingee and State Highway SH 4 connects Arcot and Villupuram, passes through Gingee.

== Demographics ==
=== Population ===
Historical population
Year	Pop.	±%
1951	7,941	—
1961	8,765	+10.4%
1971	10,222	+16.6%
1981	15,106	+47.8%
1991	16,990	+12.5%
2001	21,251	+25.1%
2011	27,045	+27.3%
Source: 1951 – 2001: 2011:

According to the 2011 census, Gingee had a population of 27,045 with a sex-ratio of 975 females for every 1,000 males, much above the national average of 929. A total of 2,893 were under the age of six, constituting 1,470 males and 1,423 females. Scheduled Castes and Scheduled Tribes accounted for 19.8% and 1.12% of the population respectively. The average literacy of the town was 76.4%, compared to the national average of 72.99%. The town had a total of 6,259 households. There were a total of 10.936 workers, comprising 487 cultivators, 640 main agricultural labourers, 414 in house hold industries, 5,721 other workers, 3,664 marginal workers, 45 marginal cultivators, 1,867 marginal agricultural labourers, 330 marginal workers in household industries and 1,442 other marginal workers.

== Politics ==
Gingee assembly constituency is part of Arni (Lok Sabha constituency). Gingee itself a legislative constituency which is currently held by the DMK party and K.S.Masthan is currently the Member of the Legislative Assembly for Senji.

== Landmarks ==
- Shiva temple, situated below the fort, was built during the reign of Raja Desingh, the Rajput king of Gingee.

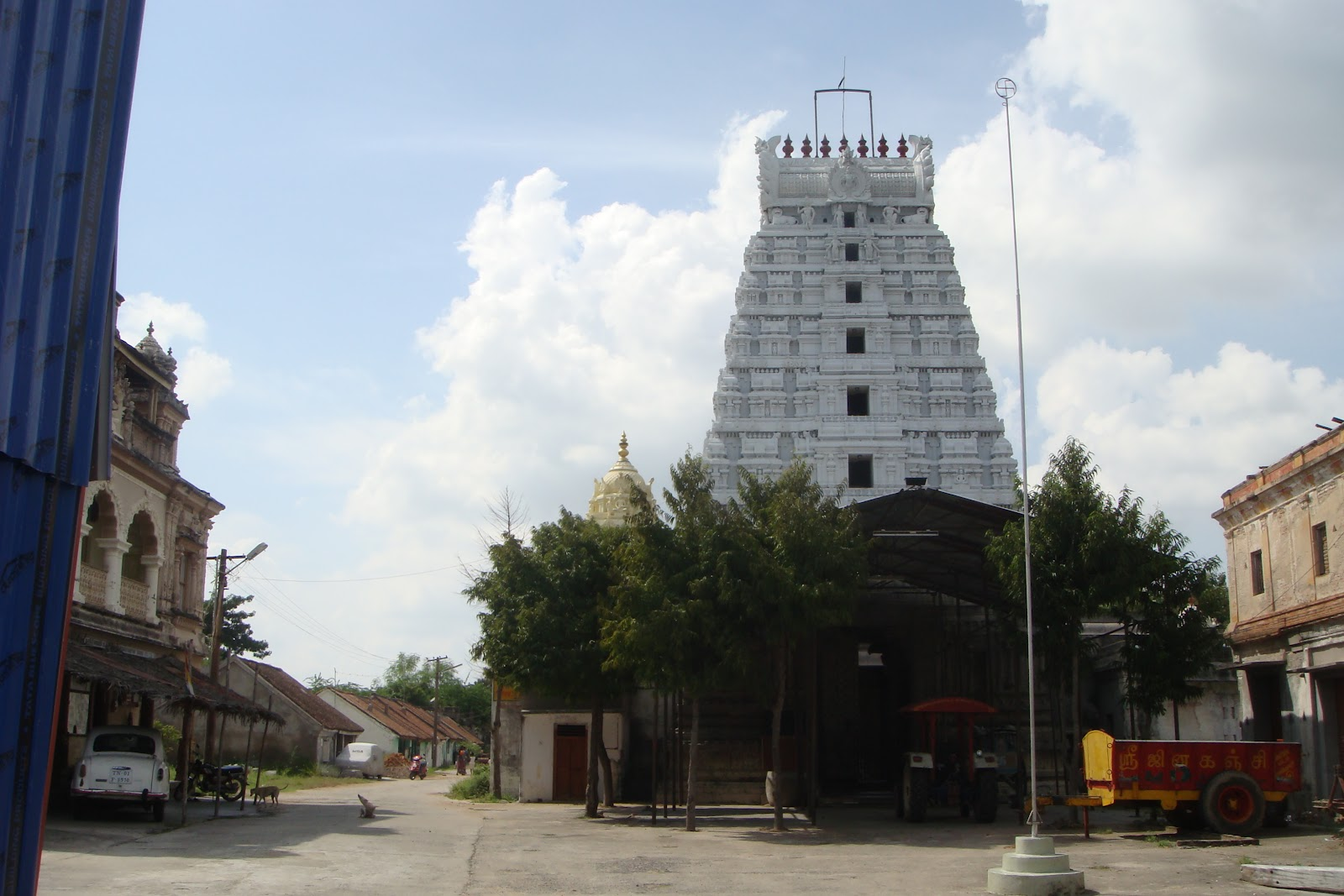
Mel Sithamur Jain Math, the residence of Bhattaraka Laxmisena

- Mel Sithamur Jain Math is a Jain Matha near Gingee. It is the primary religious center of the Tamil Jain community. It is headed by the primary religious head of this community, Bhattaraka Laxmisena Swami. The Viluppuram area has been an important centre of Jainism since ancient times. Historically, there was a Jain Math at Kanchipuram but it was shifted to its current location here.

== Gallery ==
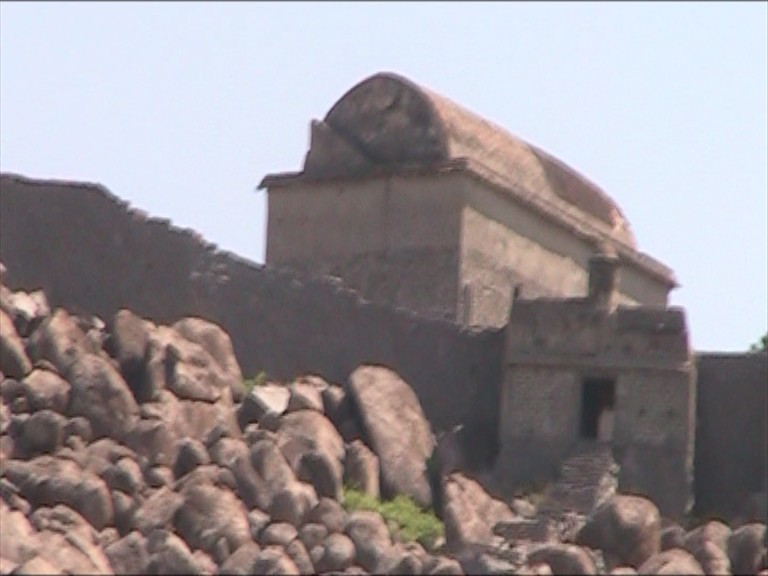
Gingee Fort, Krishnagiri

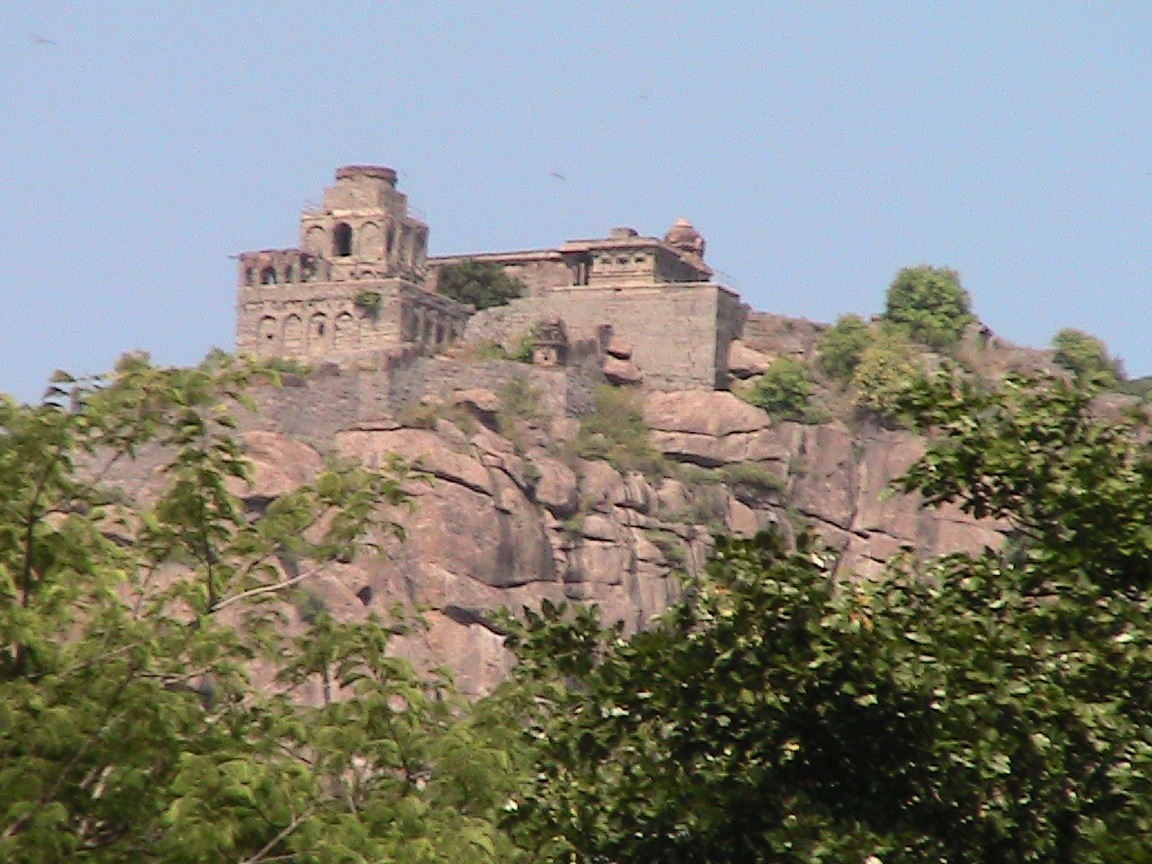
Gingee Fort, Rajagiri Hill

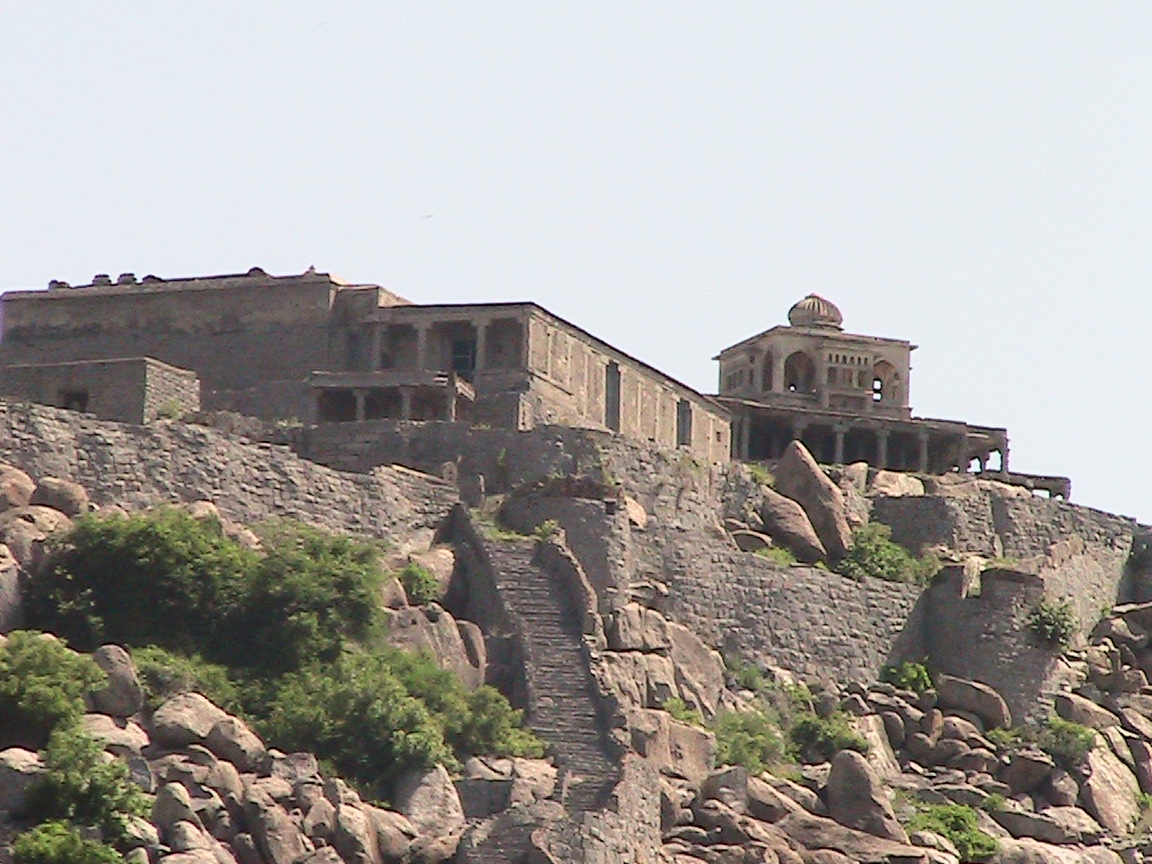
Gingee Fort View

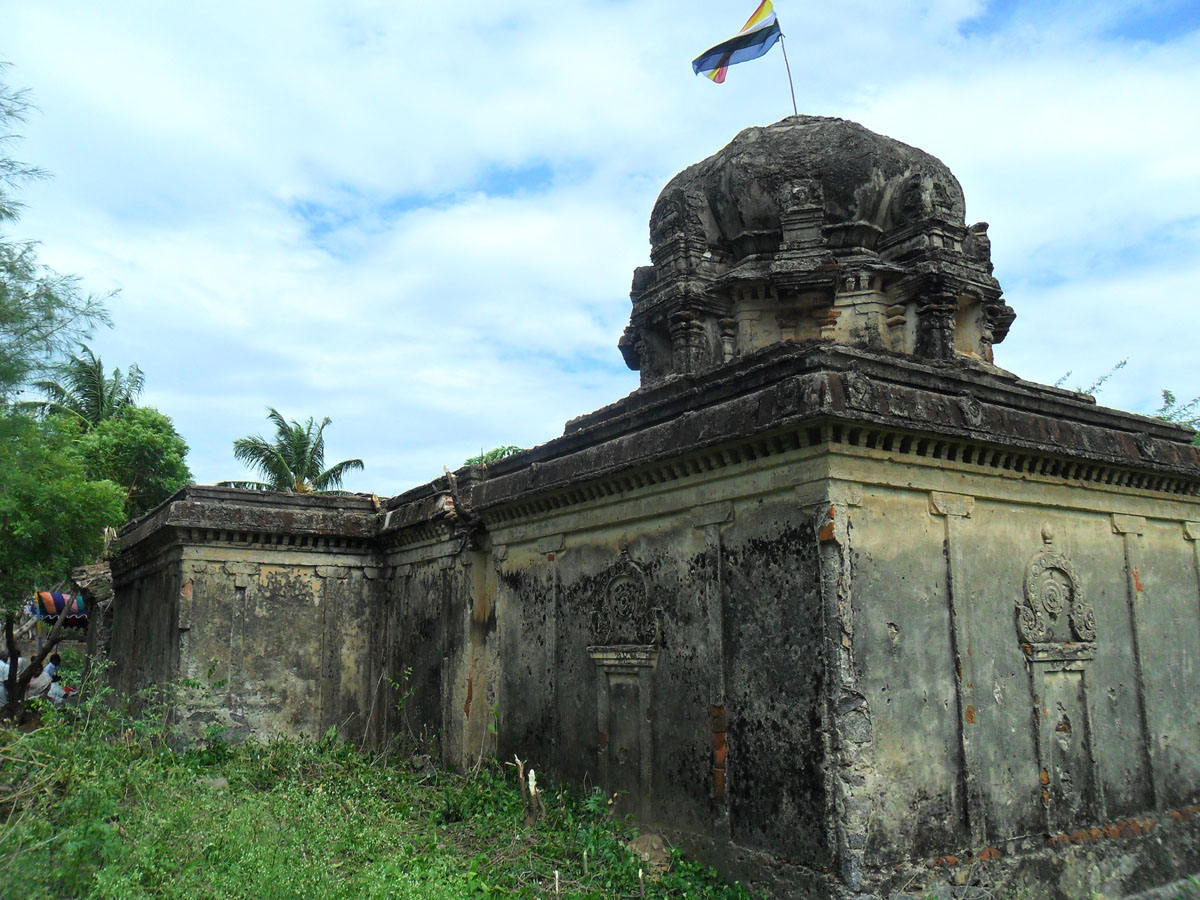
Gingee Jain temple

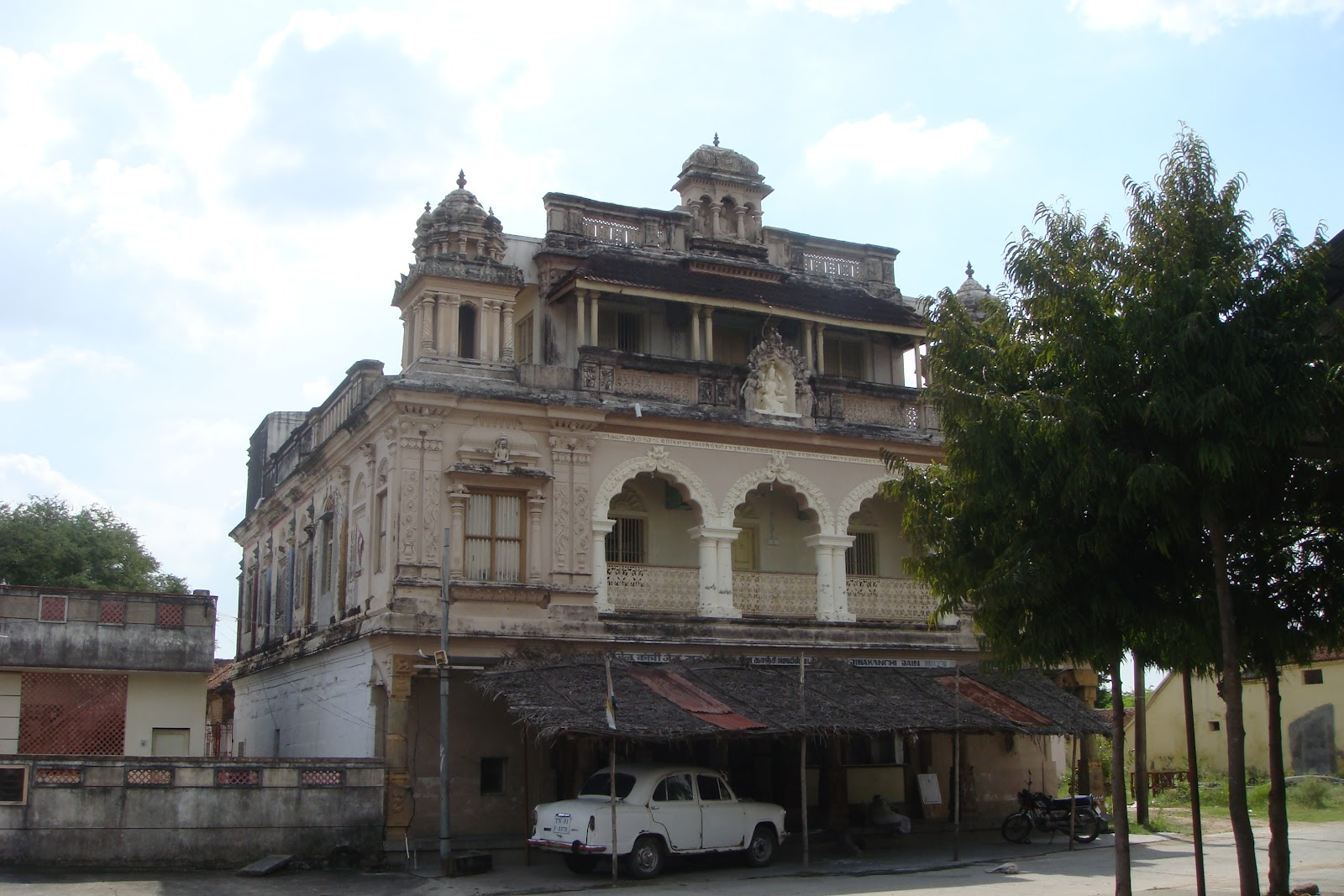
Residence of Bhattaraka Laxmisena at the Mel Sithamur Jain Math
