= Siege of Seringapatam (1659–1660) =

- Part of Vijayanagar Campaigns in South
Date	October, 1659 – January, 1660
Location	Srirangapatnam, Karnataka, India 12.414°N 76.704°E
Result	Mysore victory

Belligerents
Vijayanagar Empire: Keladi Nayakas	Kingdom of Mysore; Supported by: Bijapur Sultanate

Commanders and leaders
Sriranga III; Shivappa Nayaka; Lakshmappa Nayaka	Devaraja Wodeyar I Hamparajaiya; Bahlol Khan (AWOL); Shahaji (AWOL)
- Location within South Asia

The Siege of Srirangapatna (1659–1660) was a military conflict between the Shivappa Nayaka of Ikkeri and Devaraja Wodeyar I of Mysore Kingdom it was part of the campaign undertaken in support of Emperor Sriranga III whose cause Shivappa Nayaka had championed after establishing him at Hassan and Belur. Following his victory over the Mysore army at the Battle of Grama in September 1659, Shivappa Nayaka marched on Srirangapatna crossed the Kaveri River, and began a blockade of the fort in October 1659. He came close to capturing the city, the siege was eventually abandoned and Shivappa Nayaka returned to Bednur. The siege ended in a Mysore victory.

== Background ==
After his victory at Grama in September 1659 against the Mysore army, Shivappa Nayaka accompanied by Lakshmappa Nayaka of Holenarasipura who had turned hostile towards Mysore and was said to have intrigued with him, as well as several other rebel palegars marched against Srirangapatna itself. In October 1659, he bridged the Kaveri River, crossed it and encamped near the Srirangapatnam fort where he began a regular blockade of the city.

== Siege ==
The siege continued steadily as the authorities in Srirangapatna found themselves unable to withstand the attack. they sought assistance from a Bijapur contingent under Bahlol Khan and Shahaji. A combined force of Bijapur and Mysore commanded by Bahlol Khan, Shahaji and Hamparajaiya was then assembled to confront Shivappa Nayaka. However, Shivappa Nayaka is said to have used diplomacy to win over Bahlol Khan and Shahaji persuading them to withdraw and return to their own territories.

Shivappa Nayaka was on the verge of taking possession of the fort when the course of the siege changed. the besieged defenders, having become disheartened, bribed some of Shivappa Nayaka's officers and agents and also resorted to certain counteracting rites and ceremonies. Shivappa Nayaka is said to have fallen ill. Considering it inadvisable to prolong his stay in enemy territory he lifted the siege of Srirangapatna and returned to Bednur.

The withdrawal of Shivappa Nayaka proved costly for the Keladi army. Devaraja Wodeyar I assisted by local inhabitants pursued the retreating army and in the process also devastated the territory of Lakshmappa Nayaka. Meanwhile, General Hamparajaiya recovered his lost position and joined the pursuit. During the pursuit he inflicted heavy losses on Shivappa Nayaka's amry by cutting off the noses of several soldiers, and returned to Srirangapatna with spoils including horses, elephants, and military insignia.

== Aftermath ==
Shivappa Nayaka's attempt to capture Srirangapatna was thus unsuccessful. He did not survive long after he returned to Bednur and died on 25 September 1660.

== See also ==
- Aurangzeb
- Vellore Fort
- Mughal Empire
