= Battle of Grama =

- Part of Vijayanagara Campaigns In South
Date	September, 1659
Location	Hassan District, India
Result	Vijayanagar-Keladi victory

Belligerents
Vijayanagar Empire: Keladi Nayakas	Kingdom of Mysore

Commanders and leaders
Sriranga III; Shivappa Nayaka; Laksmappa Nayaka	Hamparajaiya (POW)

The Battle of Grama (1659) was military conflict fought between the Keladi Kingdom under Shivappa Nayaka and the Kingdom of Mysore under General Hamparajaiya. The battle took place during Shivappa Nayaka's campaign to conquer Srirangapatna in the name of Emperor Sriranga III. It ended in a Keladi victory, with Hamparajaiya and sixteen officers were captured. Then Shivappa Nayaka took possession of Grama and brought several opposing Polygars and their forts under his control.

== Background ==
After Devaraja Wodeyar I became ruler of Mysore in August 1659, Shivappa Nayaka of Keladi launched an expedition against Srirangapatna. Relations between Keladi and Mysore had remained hostile since Kanthirava Narasaraja I rejected Shivappa's proposal for an alliance in 1647. Seeking an opportunity to take revenge against Mysore Shivappa Nayaka had earlier supported the cause of Sriranga III. Under the pretext of restoring Vijayanagara Empire, he captured Hassan and Belur from Kingdom of Mysore and established Sriranga III in those regions by 1659. This strengthened Keladi's position and provided Shivappa Nayaka with a base for further campaign against Mysore.

By late 1659, the situation had become increasingly serious. Claiming to defend the interests of the Vijayanagara Empire, Shivappa Nayaka strengthened his army with forces supplied by the palegars of Sode, Biligi, Tarikere, Harapanahalli, Chintanakal, Maddagiri and Giduga as well as troops raised by the chiefs of Tulu Nadu, Konkana, Kodagu and Maleyala. After assembling this coalition he advanced toward Srirangapatna and established a camp near Grama during the campaign.

== Battle ==
Devaraja Wodeyar responded by sending a large army under the command of General Hamparajaiya to oppose Shivappa Nayaka's advance. In the battle that followed Shivappa Nayaka won a major victory over the Mysore forces. Hamparajaiya was captured along with sixteen officers, while several Mysore soldiers, elephants and horses were taken by the Keladi army.

Following the battle, Shivappa Nayaka subdued local Polygars who opposed his authority and brought their forts under his control. He also took possession of Grama.

== Aftermath ==
Accompanied by Lakshmappa Nayaka of Holenarasipura who had turned hostile towards Mysore and was said to have intrigued with Shivappa Nayaka along with several other turbulent Polygars, Shivappa Nayaka next marched against Srirangapatna itself.

== See also ==
- Tirumala Nayaka
- Golconda fort
- Bijapur Fort
