= Shri Guru Kottureshwara Temple =

Shri Guru Kottureshwara Shrine
- Kotturu
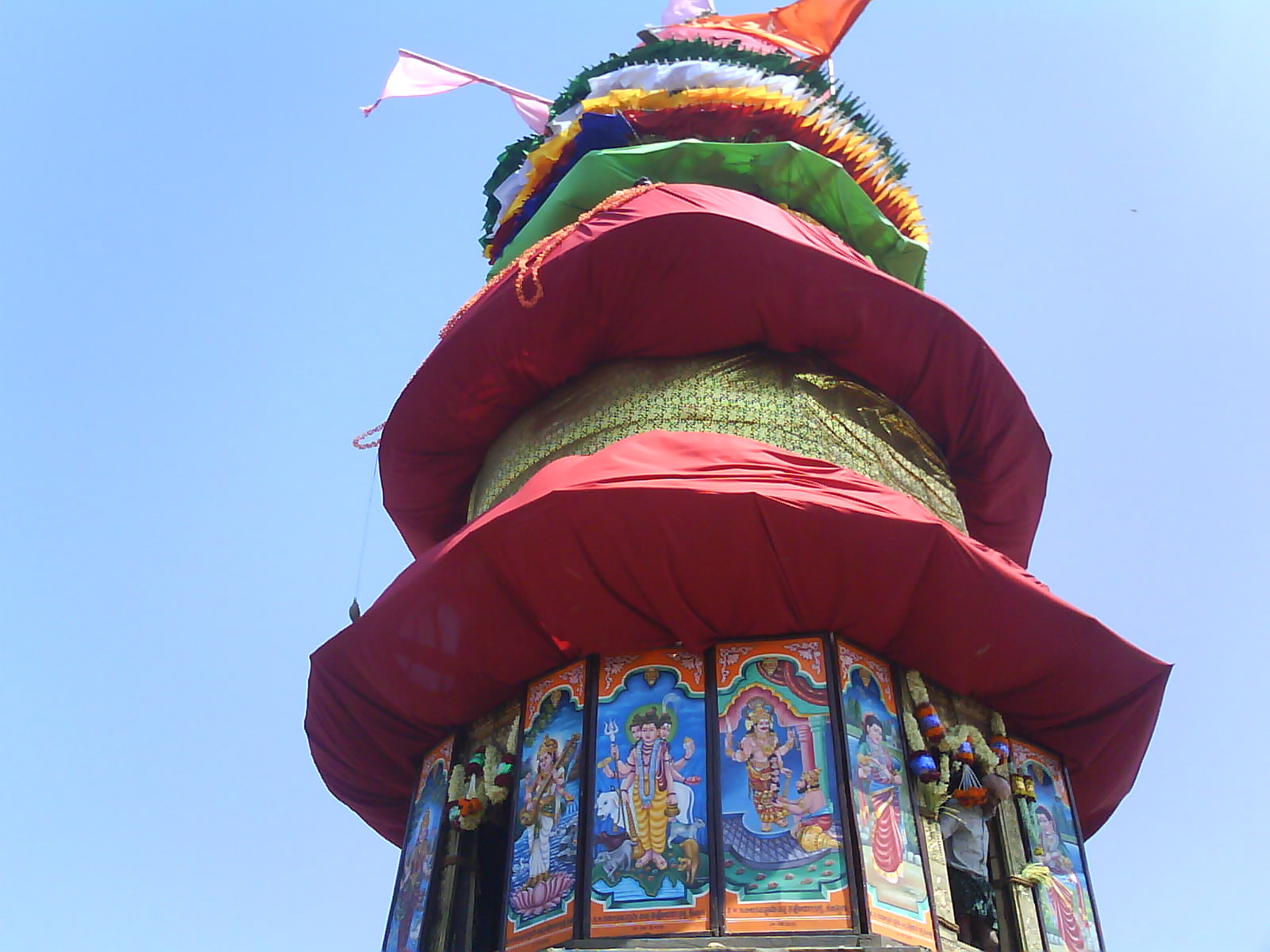
- Shri Guru Kottureshwara Rathothsava

- Location in Karnataka

Religion
- Affiliation: Hinduism
- District: Vijayanagara
- Deity: Guru Kottureshwara
- Festivals: Car Festival (Rathothsava) & Karthikotsava

Location
- Location: Kotturu
- State: Karnataka
- Country: India
- Interactive map of Shri Guru Kottureshwara Shrine
- Coordinates: 14°49′12″N 76°13′11″E

Architecture
- Creator: Vishwa Kumar MC

Specifications
- Temple: 4
- Elevation: 519 m (1,703 ft)

Website
- https://www.srigurubasaveshwara.com/

Shri Guru Kottureshwara Shrine at Kotturu is an ancient shrine located at Kotturu taluk, Vijayanagara District, North Karnataka, India, 583134. This temple is 19 km from Kudligi, 28 km from Harapanahalli, 70 km from Davanagere and 253 km from Bengaluru.

== History ==
=== Origin ===
Kotturu (Kannada: ಕೊಟ್ಟೂರು) is named after Saint Kottureshwara, and its history is closely associated with the life and legend of Guru Kottureshwara. According to local tradition, at a time when the Veerashaiva sect was under threat, Lord Shiva and Parvati, from Kailasa, instructed Nandi to descend to Sarasipura (also known as Shikapura, an earlier name of Kotturu) to protect the people. Nandi is said to have taken the form of a saint and arrived in Shikapura.

This figure came to be known as Kottureshwara—derived from the Kannada words "Kottu" or "Kodu," meaning "to give," and "Eshwara," referring to Lord Shiva—signifying "the one who grants blessings."

Kotturu is also known for a popular local dish, mandakki menasinakai. There are several varieties of mandakki, and it is customary for visitors and devotees to partake in this specialty during their visit.

=== Ancient history ===
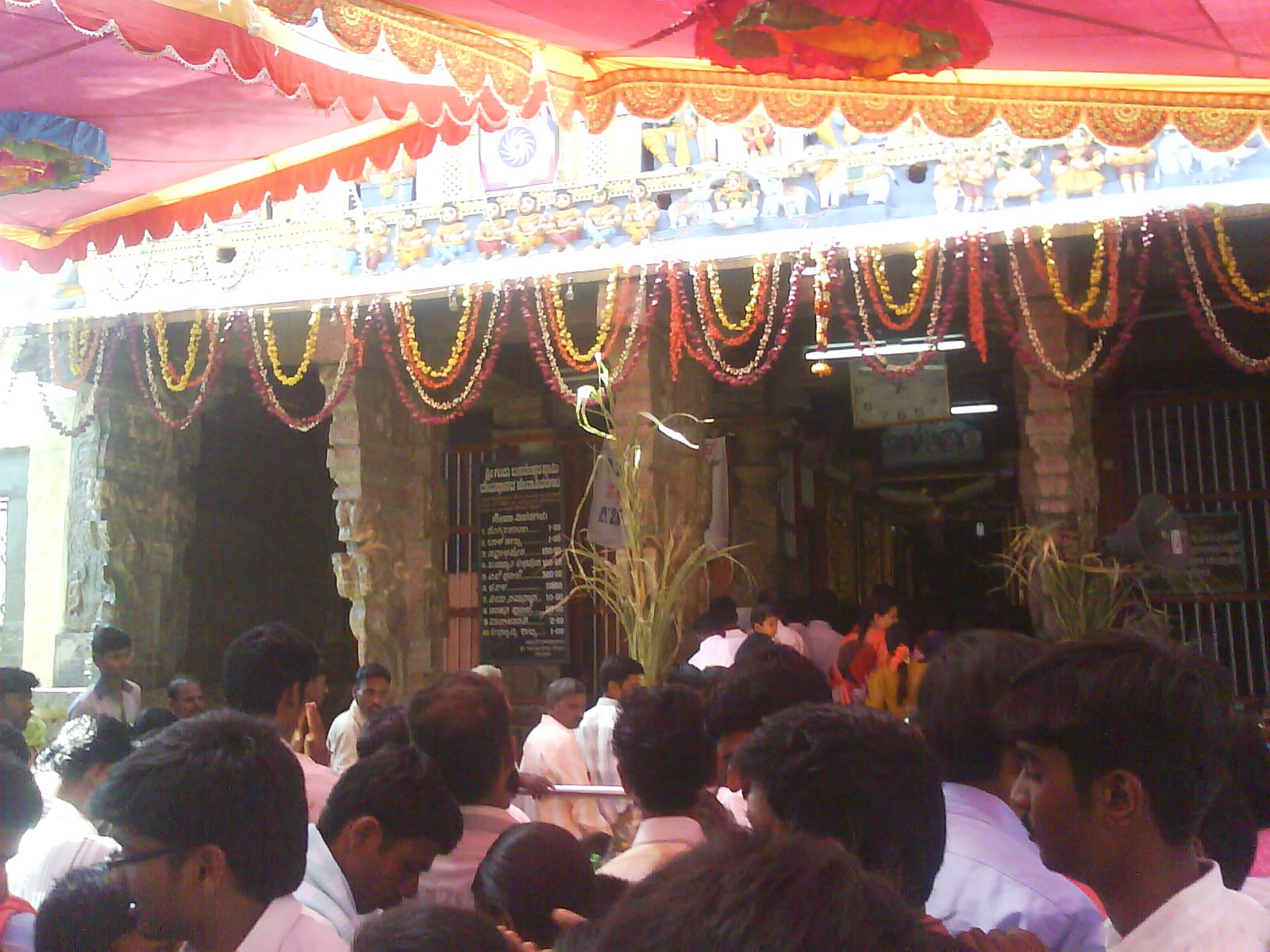
The entrance of Darbar Mutt at ಕೊಟ್ಟೂರು

It is believed that Darbar Matha (or Dodda Matha or Hire Matha) (Shrine) used to be a temple of Lord Virabhadra. Once people started visiting Lord Kottureswara to get the blessings, they stopped worshiping Lord Virabhadra. Lord Virabhadra complained about this to Lord Kottureshwara. Then the Guru asked him to occupy another place called Kodathgudda where Lord Virabhadra Swamy temple is now. This is an equally famous temple in this region.

Nandi who disappeared from Kailasa (Heaven) and appeared in the image of an untidy saint in the Shikapura or Sarasipura Shrine (Murkal Matha: The three stone temple or shrine). The presence of the Rushi (singer of sacred hymns, also an inspired poet or sage) spread throughout the Sarasipura. People started troubling Nandi by throwing stones and using bad words. All the people who troubled Nandi lost their eyes and become blind. The people realized their mistake and bowed their heads in front of the saint. By this incident Nandi who was in a disguise form became famous and people started visiting him to solve their problems. It is said that one day, a buffalo died and the cow boy approached to the Saint to save the buffalo; than the Saint kept his hand on the buffalo's head, the dead buffalo got back its life. Day by day the popularity of the saint increased. Saint offered his blessings with Shiva accompanied in his heart to all the people and solved the people's problem.

Lord Kottureshwara temple has been classified into four Mathas (Shrines):

- Murkal Matha (Three Stone Shrine): This is where Lord Nandi came first to earth.
- Thotal Matha (Shrine with Cradle): This is where Lord blesses devotees with a child.
- Darbar Matha or Dodda Mutta (Kings Assembly Shrine or Big Shrine): This is where he used solve the problems of people.
- Gachina Matha (Meditating Place): This is where Guru Kottureswara reached Lord Shiva by meditating.

Kotturamma (Parvathi's temple) is neither the wife or related to Lord Kottureshwara. She is a form of Goddess Parvathi. There is a temple outskirts of Kottur of her. The Karnam family of Kottur maintains it. There is a festival in every August which lakhs of people attend.

== Temple Activities ==
There is annual fair which happens just before MahaShivaratri. The devotees from all over the Karnataka and other states assemble here to witness the fair and car festival. Karthikotsava is celebrated during December. Karlingeshwara family members are taking care of this deity. Only their family members perform all the ritual activities for the deity.

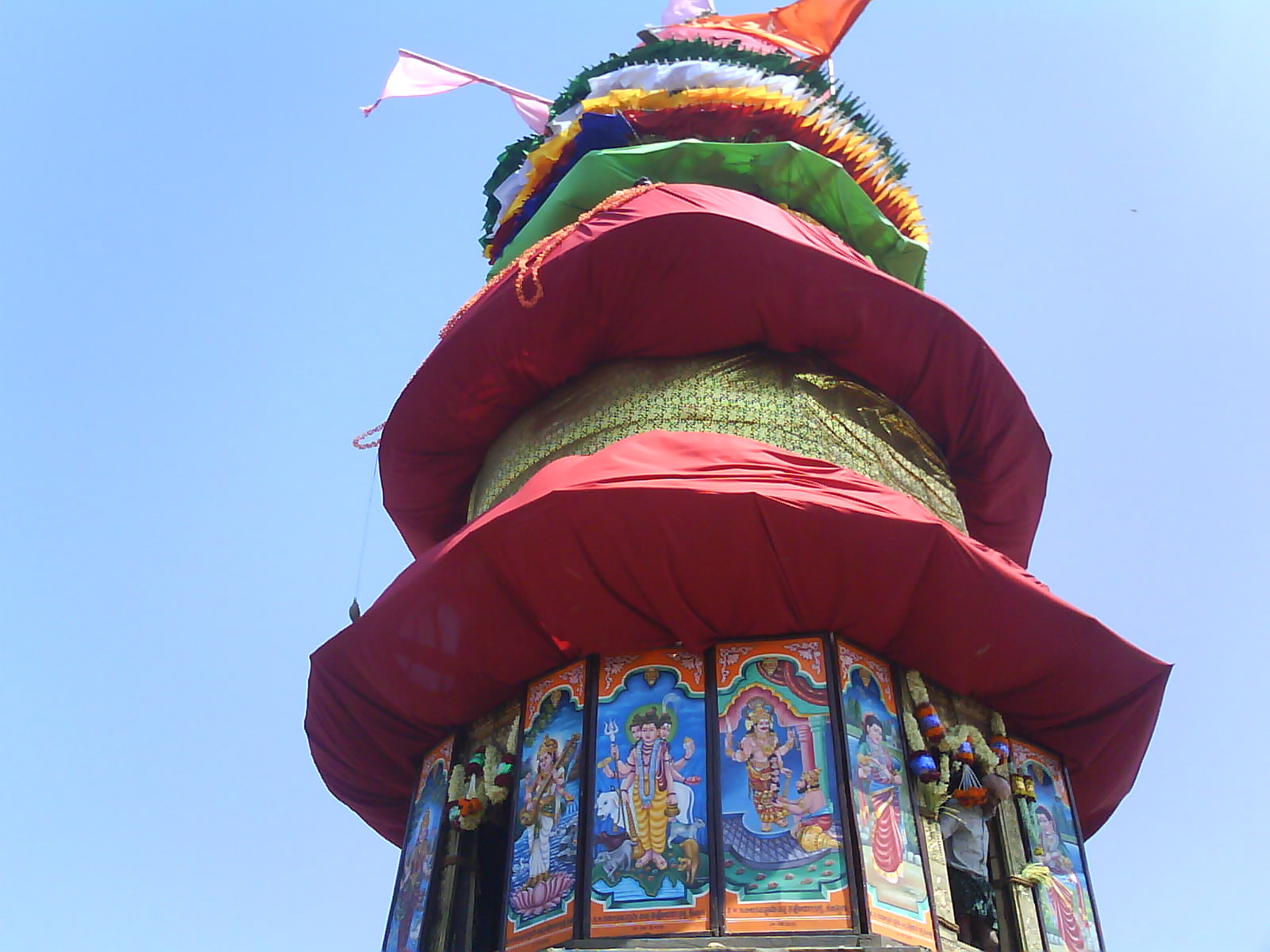
This is the ratha in which Lord's idol is placed

=== Festival activities ===
Devotees from all over Karanataka and other states visit this place during Guru Kottureshwara Theru (Rathothsava) held just before the Maha Shivaratri during February every year. The Lord Guru Kottureshwara idol is kept inside the Ratha and then he is served milk (Kannada: ಗಿಣ್ಣು-ಹಾಲು) by the tribal people. It is believed that every year cow or buffalo or goat gives birth to their young ones on this day to this tribal family; the milk which is obtained at this time is served to the Lord. Then the ratha moves based on the particular Nakshatra called mula which matches at some time on that particular day. This ratha does not move unless and until this Nakshatra matches to mula. Once the Nakshatra is matched, the ratha moves a bit on its own. This is one amazing thing to watch; it signifies that Lord Kottureshwara is now inside the ratha. Only then the devotees will be able to pull the ratha by chanting mantra "Om Shri Guru Kottureshwaraya Namaha", "Kottureshwara Doreye, Ninagyaru Sariya, Sari Sari Yendavara, Agnyana Thoreye.. Bahuparak, Bahuparak, Bahuparak||". Later when the ratha starts moving, the devotees offer flower garlands, coconuts and bananas to the Lord Kottureshwara.

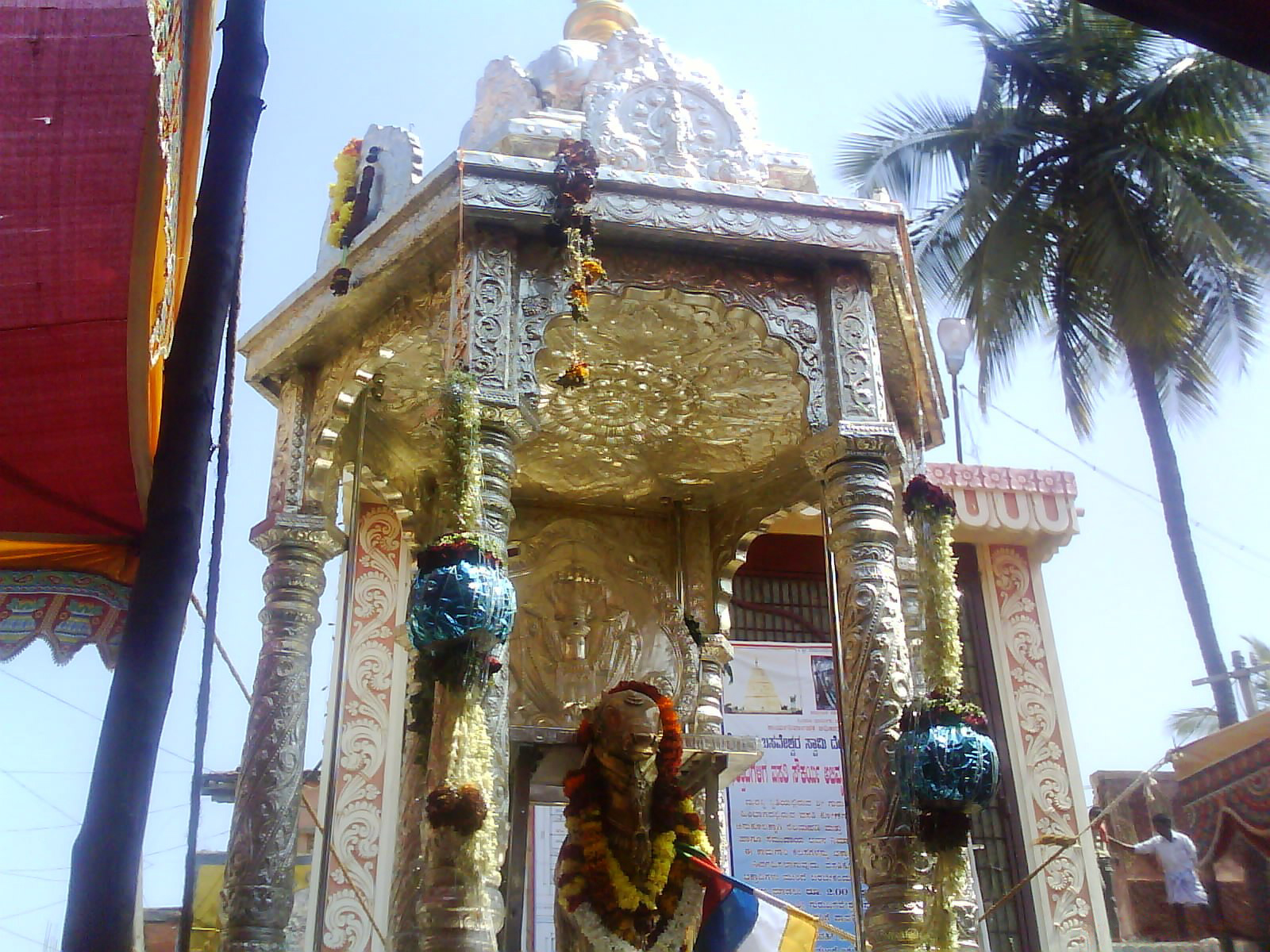
Silver ratha at the entrance of Darbar Mutt at ಕೊಟ್ಟೂರು

Some of the devotees reach Kottur by walking from their native places which is normally called as Padha Yatra (procession). People from nearby villages serve them food, fruit, juice and medicine on the way as part of their tribute to the Lord Guru Kottureshwara. On reaching the place Kottur, devotees visit Darbar Mutta first, then the remaining three shrines and then stay at Gachina Mutta or other Muttas.

During the month of December, there will be Karthikotsava that is celebrated for about six weeks, where they light the diyas in the temple. Diya are small earthen lamp that is specially lit on Diwali for puja and decoration purposes. A cotton wick is used in diyas and oil or ghee serves as the burning fuel. The whole shrine will be glowing bright with these beautiful diyas.

=== Prasadam activities ===
The devotees are provided with Prasadam on Rathothsava day which is provided by the devotees of Davangere in form of dana.

== Transport ==
=== Road ===
- Bangalore-Chitradurga-Jagalur-Ujjini-Kotturu.
- Bangalore-Chitradurga-Kudligi-Kotturu.
- Bellary-Hospet-Hagaribommanahalli-Kotturu.
- Davangere-Harihara-Harapanahalli-Kotturu.
- Haveri-Harihara-Harapanahalli-Kotturu.
- Shimoga-Harihara-Harapanahalli-Kotturu.

There are direct K.S.R.T.C. (Karnataka State Road Transport Corporation) buses to Kotturu from Bangalore during the night. Passengers have to board the bus going to Hagaribommanahalli and Harapanahalli. There are some special buses provided by the K.S.R.T.C. to reach Kotturu during this car festival.

=== Railway station ===
- Bangalore-Harihar-Darwar.
- Bangalore-Davangere-Harihar-Harapanahalli-Kotturu

Alight at Harihar and then catch a bus; K.S.R.T.C. buses are available from here to reach Kotturu.

=== Airports ===
The nearest airport is at Hubli and an international airport is at Bengaluru.
