= Panchacharyas =

Religious figures of India

- First appearance: Siddhanta Shikhamani
- Adapted by: Panchapeethas
- Portrayed by: Shivayogi Shivacharya

In-universe information
- Full name: Jagadguru Panchacharya
- Gender: Male
- Affiliation: Telugu aradhya brahmins; Vedic priesthood
- Religion: Hinduism

Panchacharyas are religious figures of Veerashiva denomination of Shaivism. Veerashaivism is thought to be an evolution of the Kalamukha Shaiva Jiyar tradition. Panchacharya means five sages, referring to Renukacharya, Darukacharya, Ekorama, Panditharadhya, and Vishwaradhya, their iconography is sage emerging from the five Shivalingams of the Panchapeethas. They are seated in Panchapeethas (five monasteries) known as Veera (Rambhapuri), Saddharma (Ujjaini), Vairagya (Kedar), Surya (Srisailam), and Jnana (Kashi) Shimhasanas. Renukacharya is first mentioned in Siddhanta Shikhamani, in the Sanskrit language written by Shivayogi Shivacharya, it is regarded as holy book for the Veerashaivas.

== History ==
Timeline of Panchacharyas

←	Siddhanta Shikhamani a Sanskrit language mythological fiction published in between 1430-1490

←	Veerashaivamrutha Purana a Sanskrit language mythological fiction published in 1530

←	Chathuracharya Purana a Sanskrit language mythological fiction published in 1698

←	Chathuracharyas take overs Jangamawadi math from Natha tradition, appoints new acharya, later they crowned themselves as Panchacharyas

←	Shri Shaila Peetha converted from Telugu aradhya brahmin tradition to Lingayatism

←	Rambapuri peetha was converted from Natha tradition to Veerashaiva

←	Some of Telugu aradhaya brahmins migrated to Kannada region

←	Ujjaini and Kedara Peetha converted from Natha tradition to Veerashaiva

←	Claim as Panchacharyas are founder of Veerashaivas

←	Iconography of a sage standing on Shivalingam

Telugu aradhya brahmin
Chathuracharyas
Panchacharyas

Panchacharyas origin is traced to Siddhanta Shikhamani a 15th-century mythological fiction of Sanskrit language written by Shivayogi Shivacharya, During 14th century some Telugu aradhya Brahmin priests migrated to Kannada region due to rise of Vaishnava dominance in Telugu region, they mesmerized by the large following of Lingayatism, and they started to mix Lingayatism and brahminism, but did not stop their Brahminism. Similar to their past Brahmanical Acharya Traya, meaning three sages (Adishankaracharya, Madhavacharya, Ramanujacharya, and their peethas), the five priest among the migrant five sages crowned themselves as a Panchacharyas and established panchpeethas, which are named after famous shiva temples, and Panchacharyas are the founders of Veerashaivism, they created mythological fiction Siddhanta Shikhamani, manipulated agama and other Shaiva literature, republished it as Veerashaivaagama to support their claims. A small manuscript named Acharya-Guru-Parampara details the following guru lineage of Panchapeethas; Visvesvara Guru, Ekorama, Viresaradhya, Virabhadra, Viranaradhya, Manikyaradhya, Buccayyaradhya, Vira Mallesvaradhya, Desikaradhya, Vrsabha, Aksaka, and Mukha Lingesvara.

== Siddhanta Shikhamani ==
Siddhanta Shikhamani is a Sanskrit language mythological fiction of 15th century written by Shivayogi Shivacharya, it is also known as Renukagastya samvada. In 21st century Siddhantha Shikhamani was translated to Kannada by Dr Chandrashekhara Shivacharya swamiji head of one of the Panchapeetha.

=== Summery of Siddhanta Shikhamani ===
Siddhanta Shikamani has 21 chapters, The introduction starts with a prayer to Shiva, it further states, this holy book is equivalent to the Vedas and all knowledge of Upanishads and Agamas, It claims Renukaradhya arose out of five great Sthavaralingas, in different yugas they were dharma pracharaks in the Krutayuga, Tretayuga and Dwaparayuga; and they had given advice to Vibhishana of the Ramayana; and they described the glories of Shiva to sage Agastya; and they had given the Chandramouleshwara Linga to Shankaracharya; The fictional claims continues.

— Summery, Siddhantha Shikhamani, 15th century mythological fiction

Based on this book the Panchapeethas claimed Panchacharyas are a founders of Lingayatism or Veerashaiva, however this claim is rejected by researchers and opinioned Siddhanta Shikhamani is mythological fiction not a history, it is written after a centuries of founding Lingayatism or Veerashaiva by Basava and there is no mention of any of this Panchacharyas in any Hindu literatures or inscriptions which predates 15th century. Researchers also rejected claims of Siddhanta Shikhamani, as per them no Veda, Agama, Upanishad, Brahmanaka, Aranyaka or any text related to Shankaracharya or the Ramayana or any Hindu literature make a mention of any of these Panchacharyas or their amazing activities.

== Iconography ==
=== A sage emerging from Shivalingam ===
Renukacharya, Darukacharya, Ekorama, Panditharadhya, Vishwaradhyas are called as Panchacharyas, their iconography is a sage emerging from Shivalingam, it is based on Siddhanta Shikhamani, as per this mythology Renukaradhya is said to have been emerged from the Someshwara lingam in Kolanupaka of Telangana.

== Gallery ==
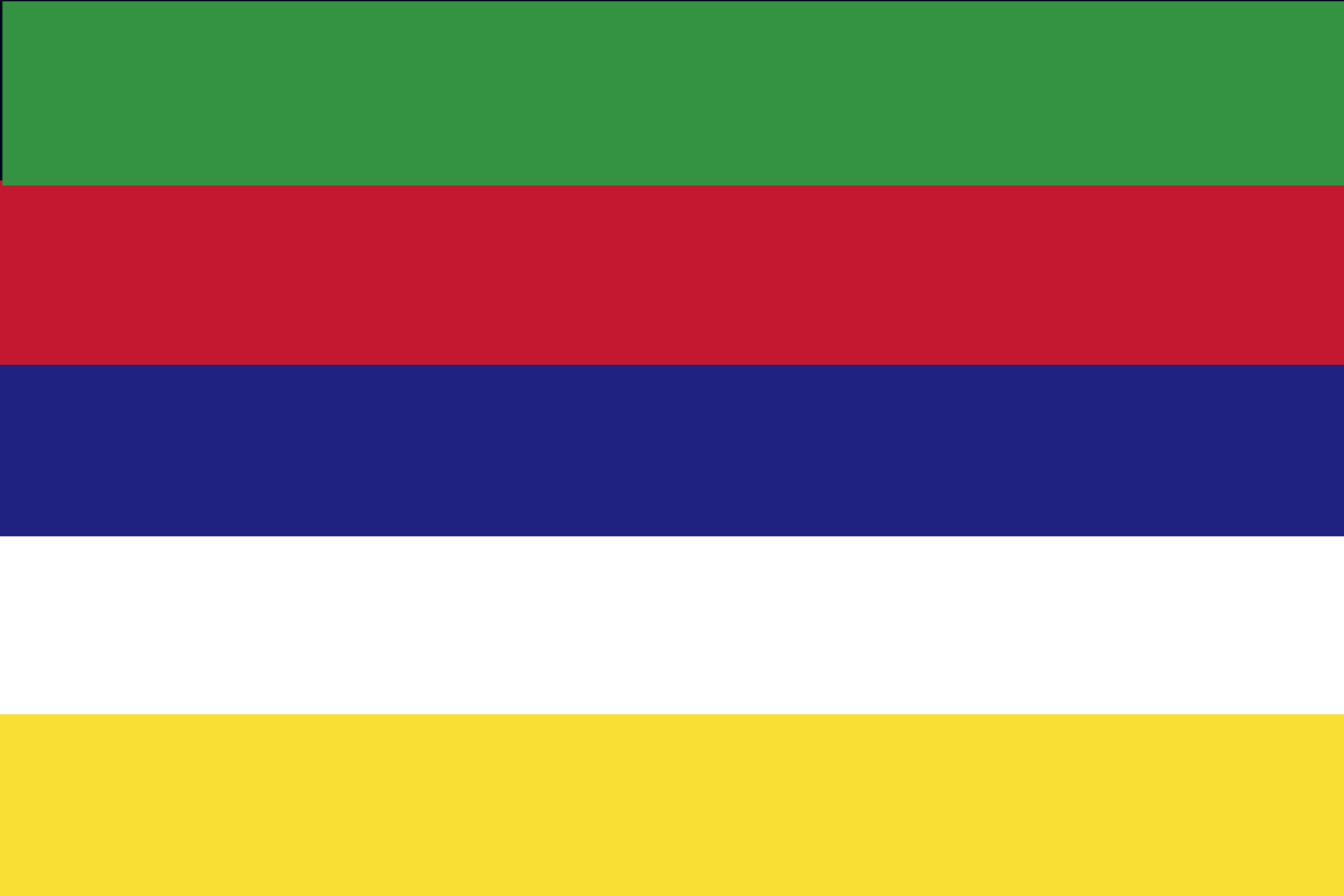
Flag of Panchacharyas

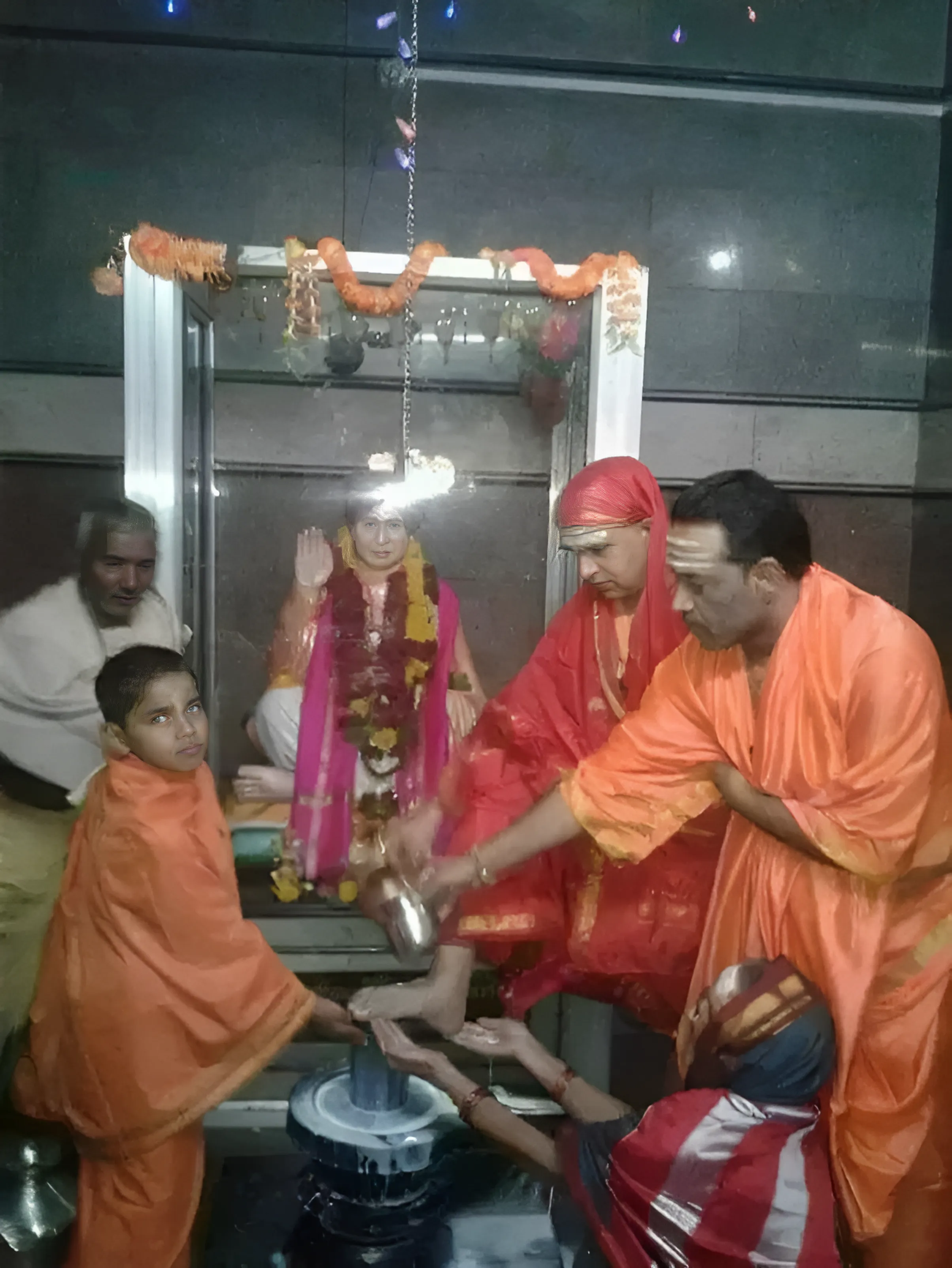
Padapuje on Shivalingam

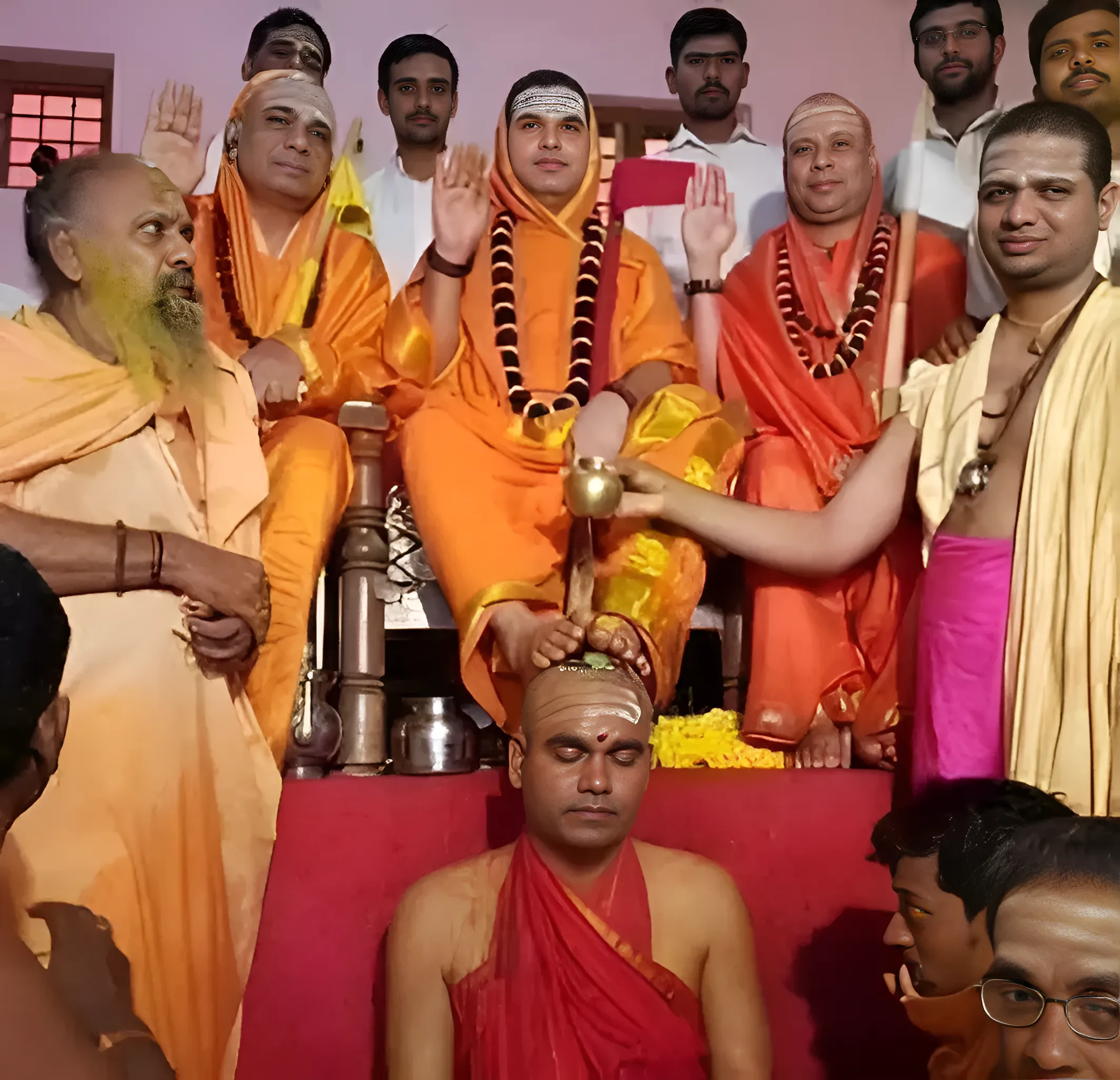
Padapuje on head of the devotee

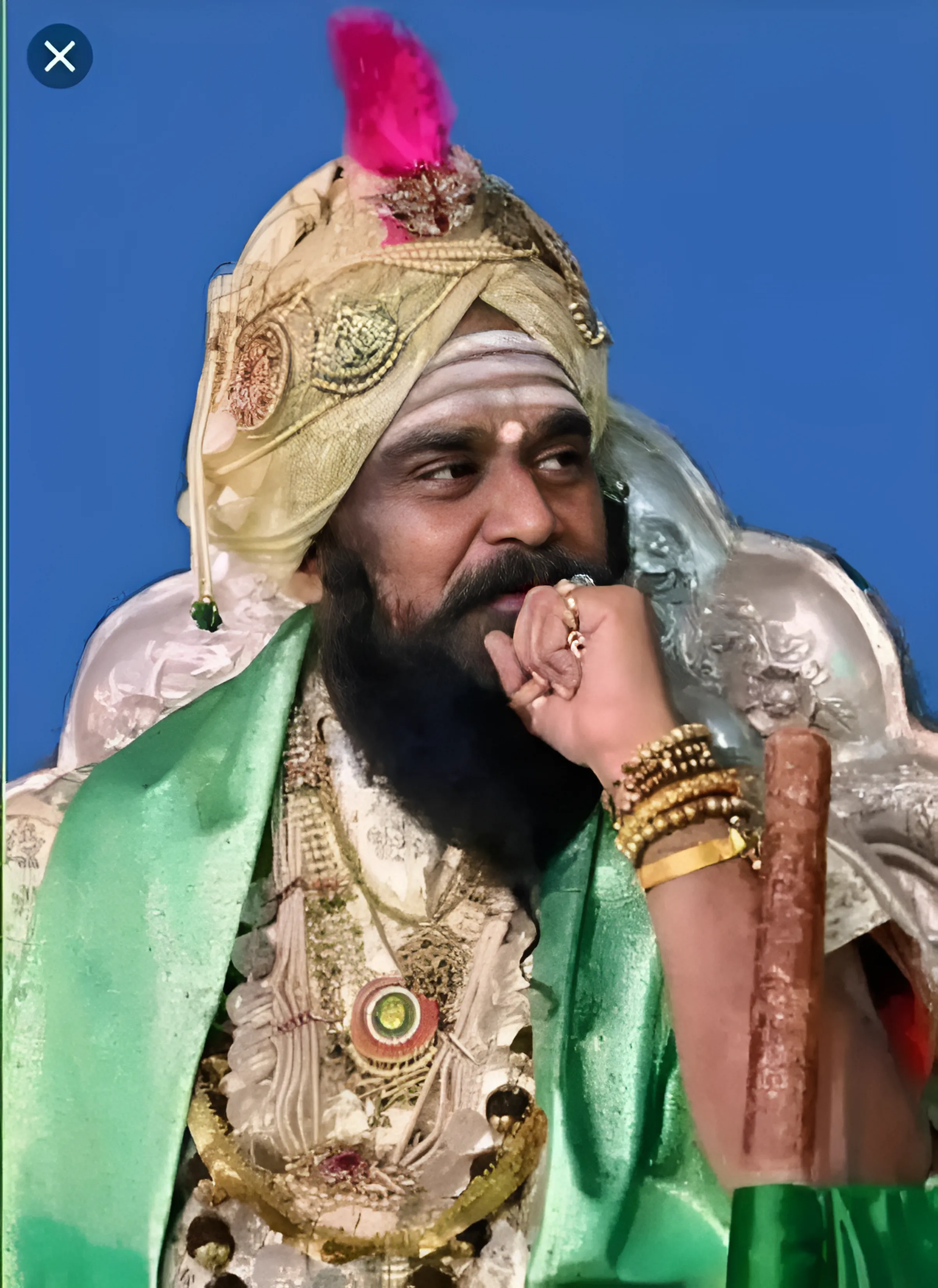
Head of Rambapuri Peetha

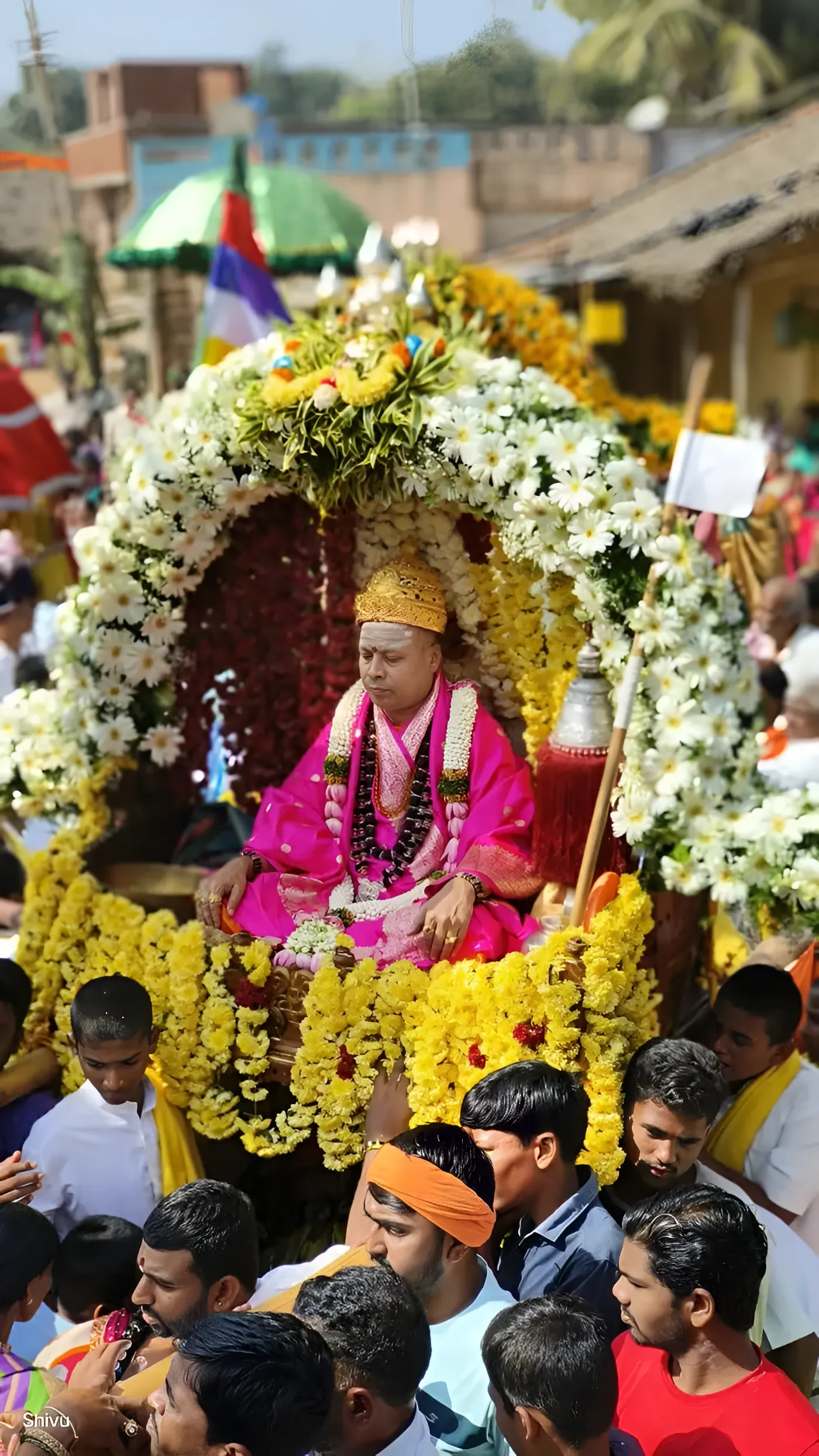
Pallakki utsav

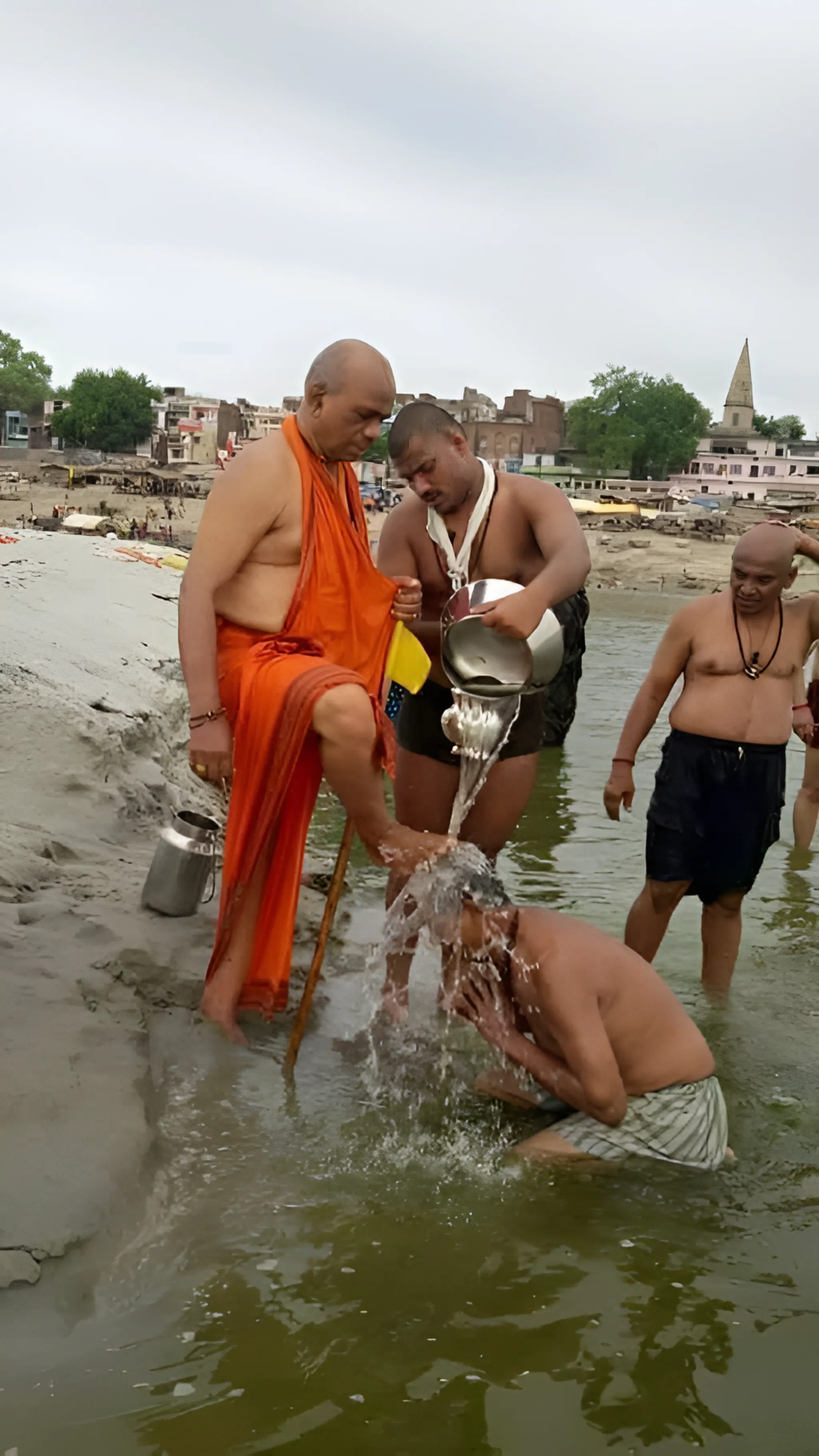
Padapuje on head of the devotee
