= Ujjini =

Ujjini Ujjayani
- village
- Location in Karnataka, India Ujjini (India)
- Coordinates: 14.91°N 76.40°E
- Country: India
- State: Karnataka
- District: vijaynagar
- Talukas: kottur

Population (2001)
  - Total: 8,231

Languages
  - Official: Kannada
- Time zone: UTC+5:30 (IST)
- PIN: 583136
- Telephone code: 08391
- Vehicle registration: KA35
- Nearest city: Hospet, Kotturu, Jagaluru
- Lok Sabha constituency: Bellary
- Vidhan Sabha constituency: Kudligi

Ujjini is a village in the southern state of Karnataka, India. It is located in the Kottur taluk of Vijayanagar district in Karnataka.

== Marulasiddeswara Temple ==
Ujjini is renowned for the ancient Marulasiddheshwar Temple, also called Saddharma Simhasana Peetha (Marulasiddha Math), one of the Pancha Peethas, and commonly known as Ujjini Math. Constructed during the Kalyana Chalukya (Western Chalukya Empire) period, the temple was later expanded through donations received under the rule of the Devagiri Yadavas, Vijayanagara Kings, and the Palayagaras. There is a proverb used in this region "Ujjini olage nodu, Hampi horage nodu" ("It's wonderful to watch the Sculptures inside the temple of Ujjini and the same could be seen in and around the Hampi Temple").

There is a unique festivity celebrated in Ujjini called "Shikara Thailabhisheka" This occurs every year in April or May. The Chariot festival (Rathotsava) is celebrated a day before Thailabhisheka.

This is one of the panchapeetha, along with Kashi, Kedar, Srishaila and Baalehonnur. Shri Guru Kottureshwara Temple of Kottur is 14 km from Ujjini.

== Connection ==
Ujjini has good bus connectivity between Hospet, Chitradurga, Davanagere and Bellary.

== Demographics ==
As of 2001 India census, Ujjini had a population of 8231 with 4233 males and 3998 females.

== See also ==
- Bellary
- Districts of Karnataka
