= Shivappa Nayaka Palace, Shimoga =

Palace and museum in Karnataka state, India

Shivappa Nayaka Palace
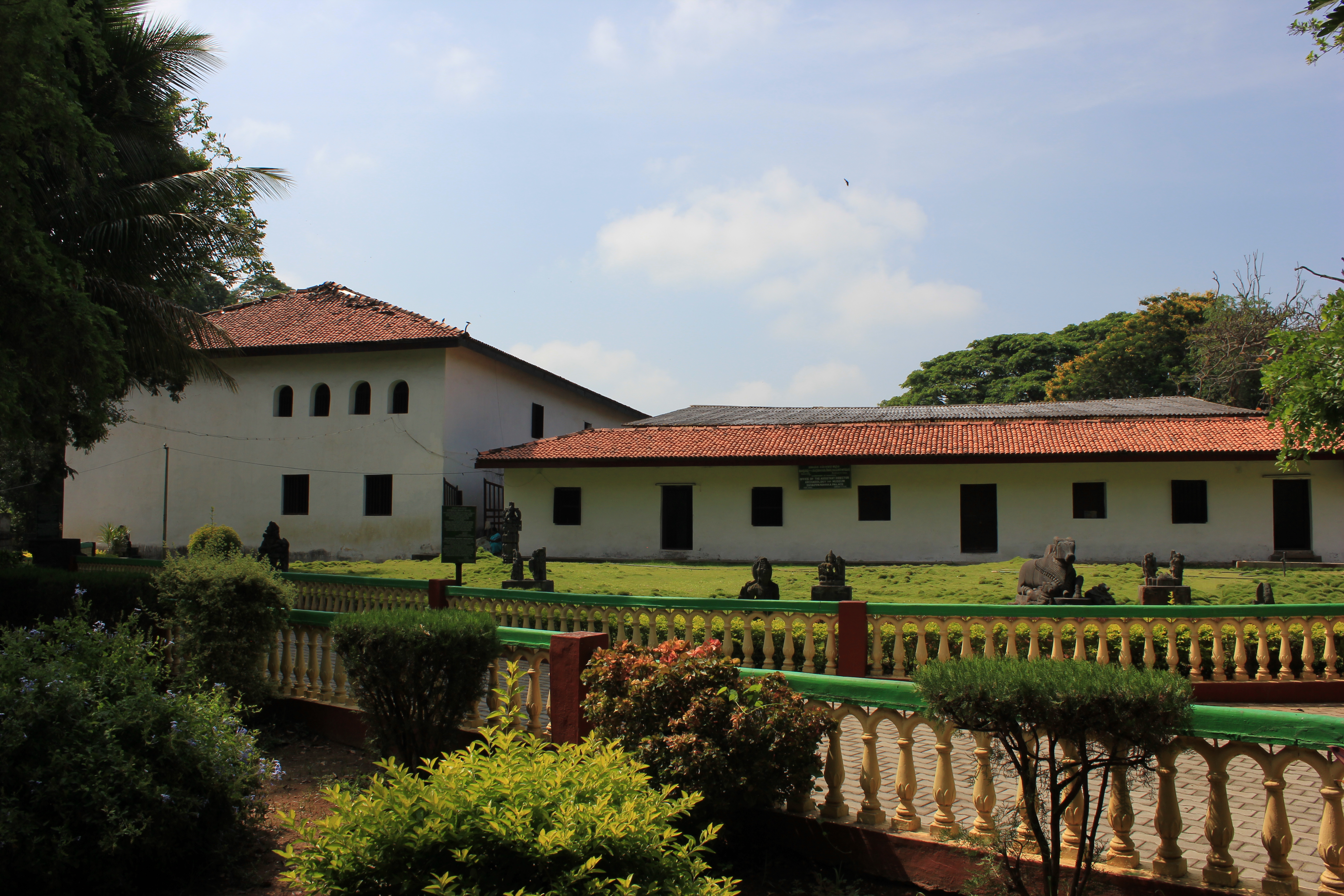
- Shivappa Nayaka Palace and garden

General information
- Location: Shivamogga, Karnataka, India
- Year built: 18th Century

The Shivappa Nayaka Palace named after the popular 17th-century king Shivappa Nayaka of the Keladi Nayaka dynasty is located in Shivamogga city (formerly known as Shimoga), the district headquarters of the Shivamogga district in Karnataka state, India. It is now the site of a government museum.

Though named after the Nayaka king, according to art historian George Michell, the palatial bungalow was actually built by the 18th century Mysore ruler Hyder Ali. The building is a protected monument under the Karnataka state division of the Archaeological Survey of India.

The two storied building comprises a Durbar hall ("nobel court") with massive wooden pillars and lobed arched panels. The living chambers on the sides are at the upper level and have balconies and look down into the hall.

Numerous antiquities collected from near by temples and archeological sites, such as sculptures, inscriptions and hero stones from the Hoysala era and later periods are on display at the palace grounds.

== Gallery ==
=== The Building ===
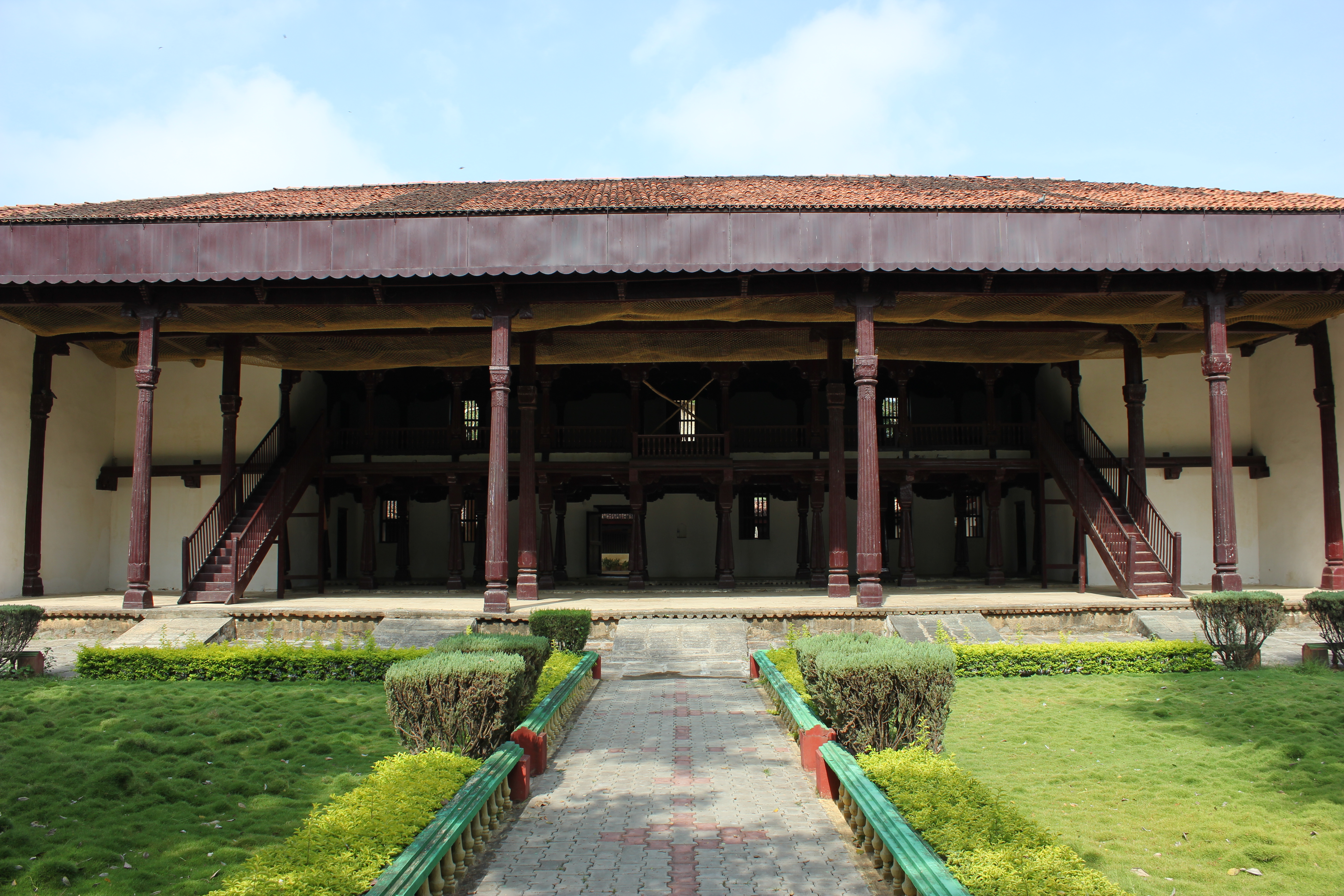
Darbar hall in the Shivappa Nayaka Palace.

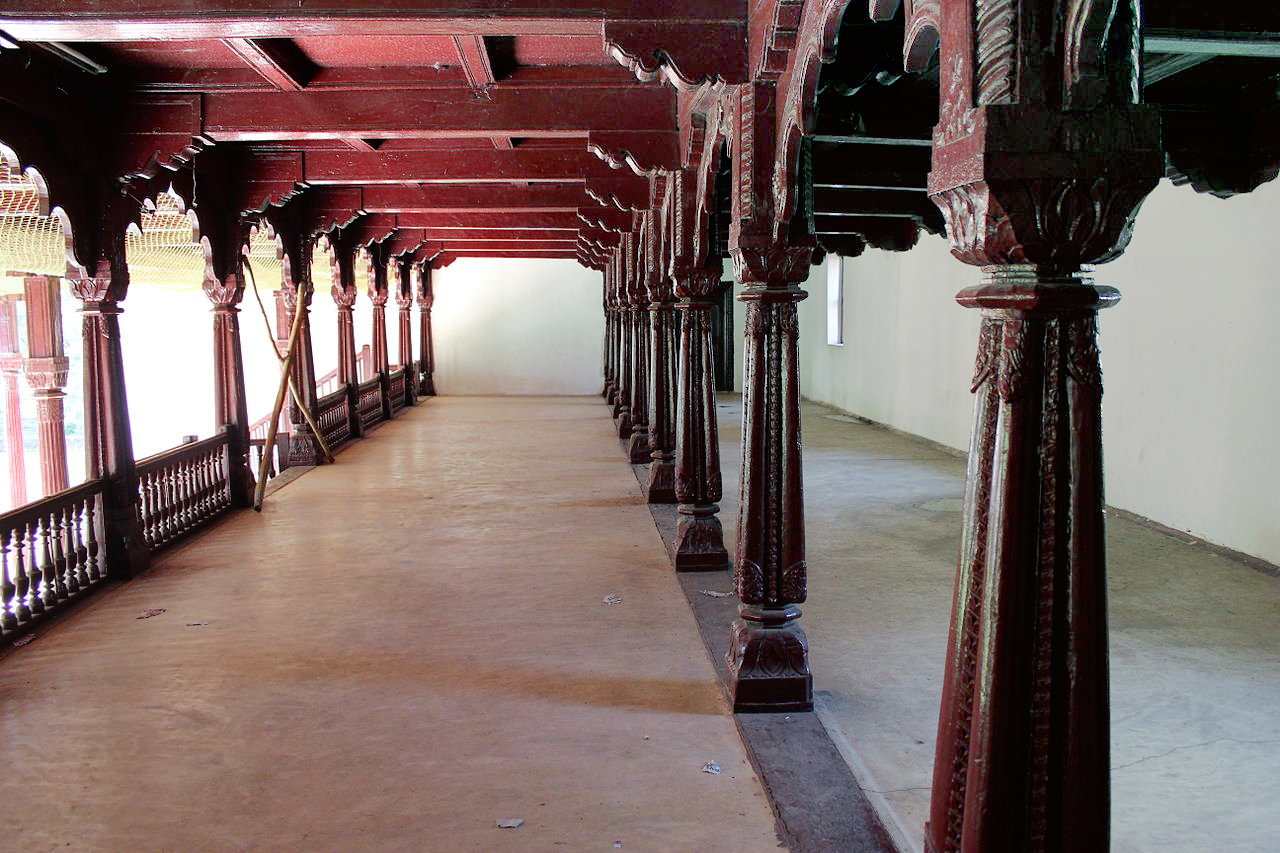
The Interior

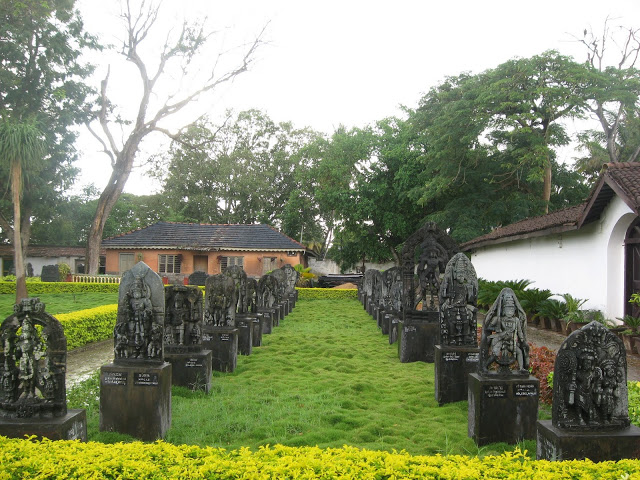
Sculptures in the courtyard of the Palace.

=== 12th century Hindu Sculptures ===
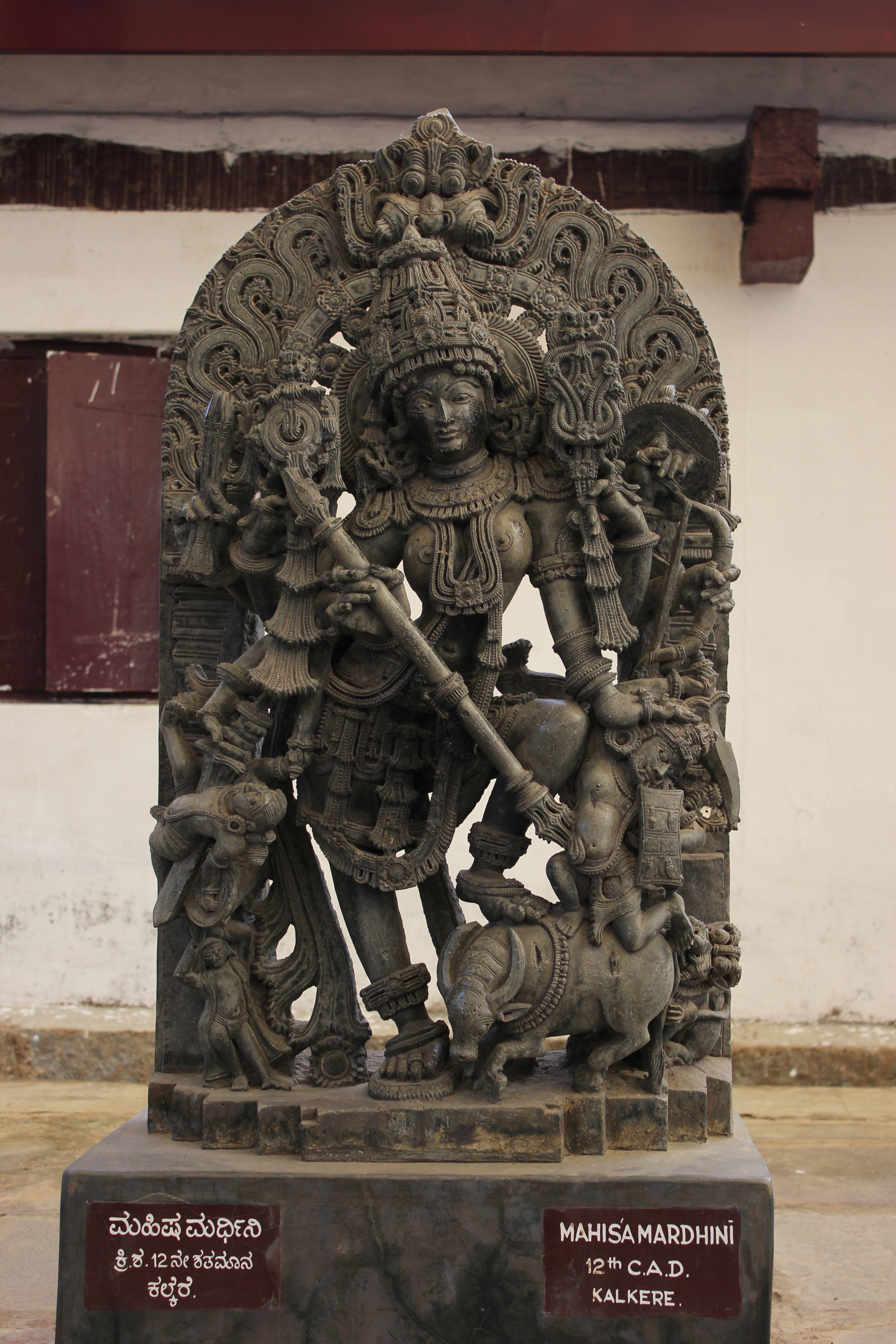
Sculpture of Mahishasura Mardhini dated to the 12th century.

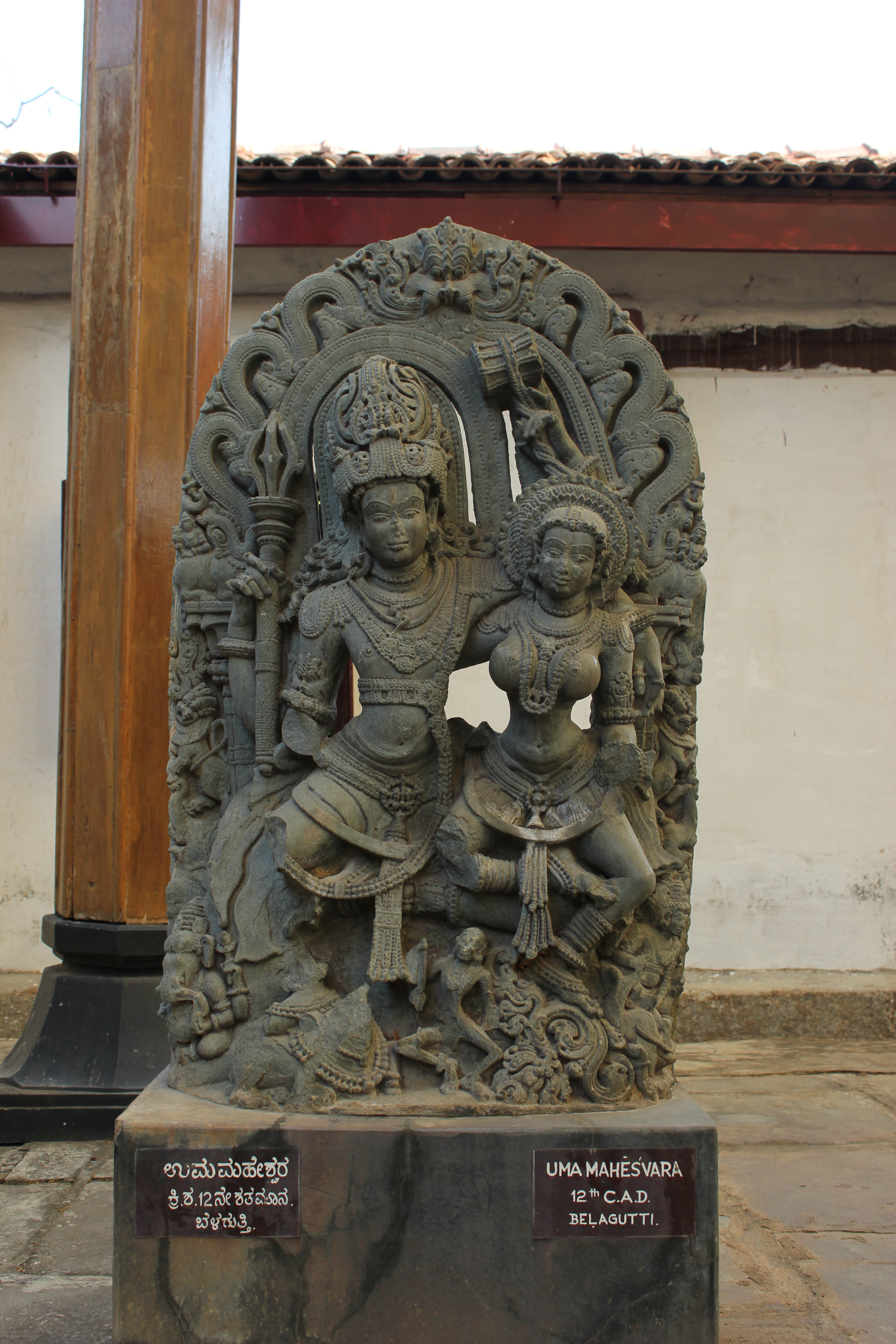
Sculpture of Uma-Maheshvara dated to the 12th century from Belagutti.

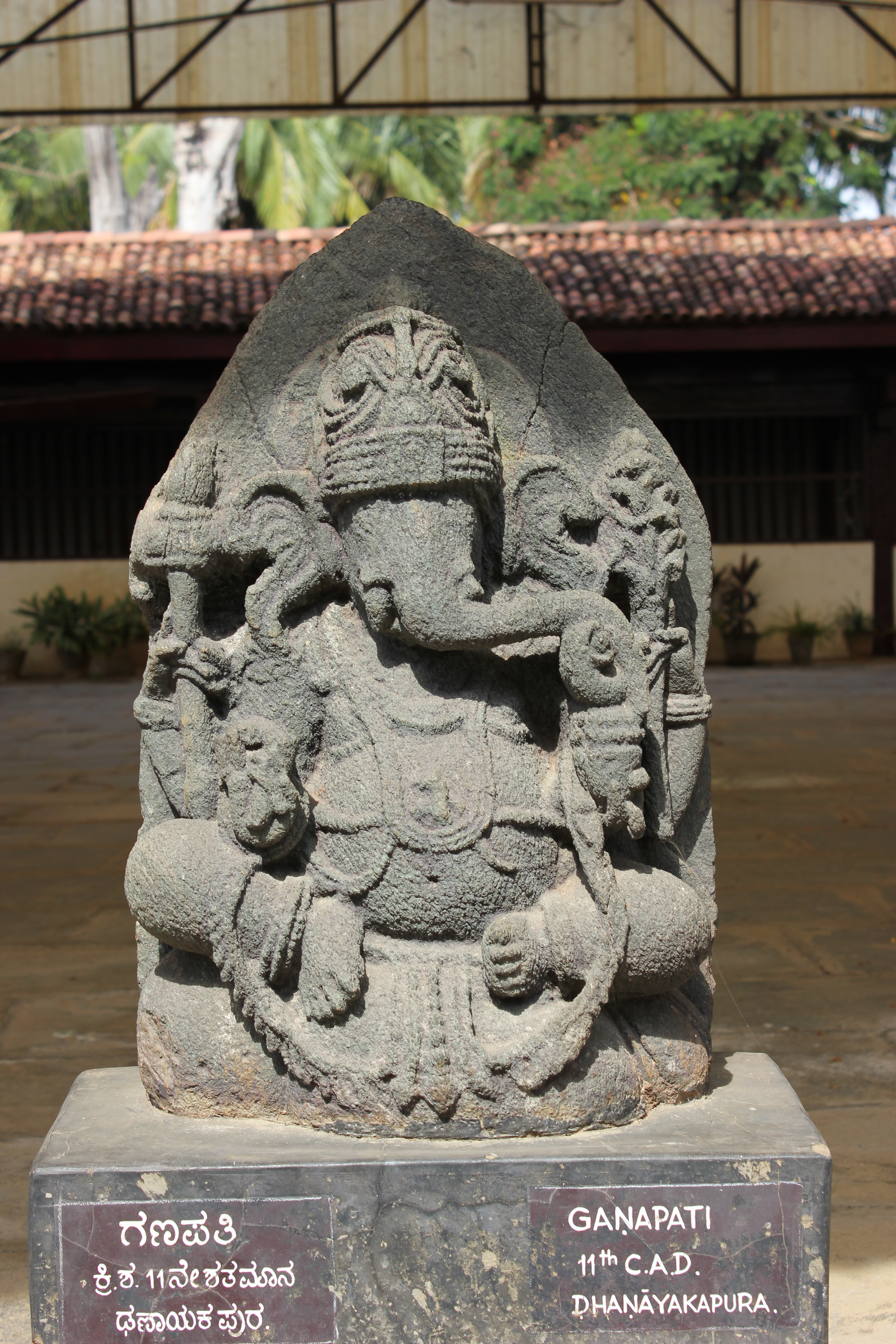
Sculpture of Ganapati dated to the 11th century from Danayakapura.

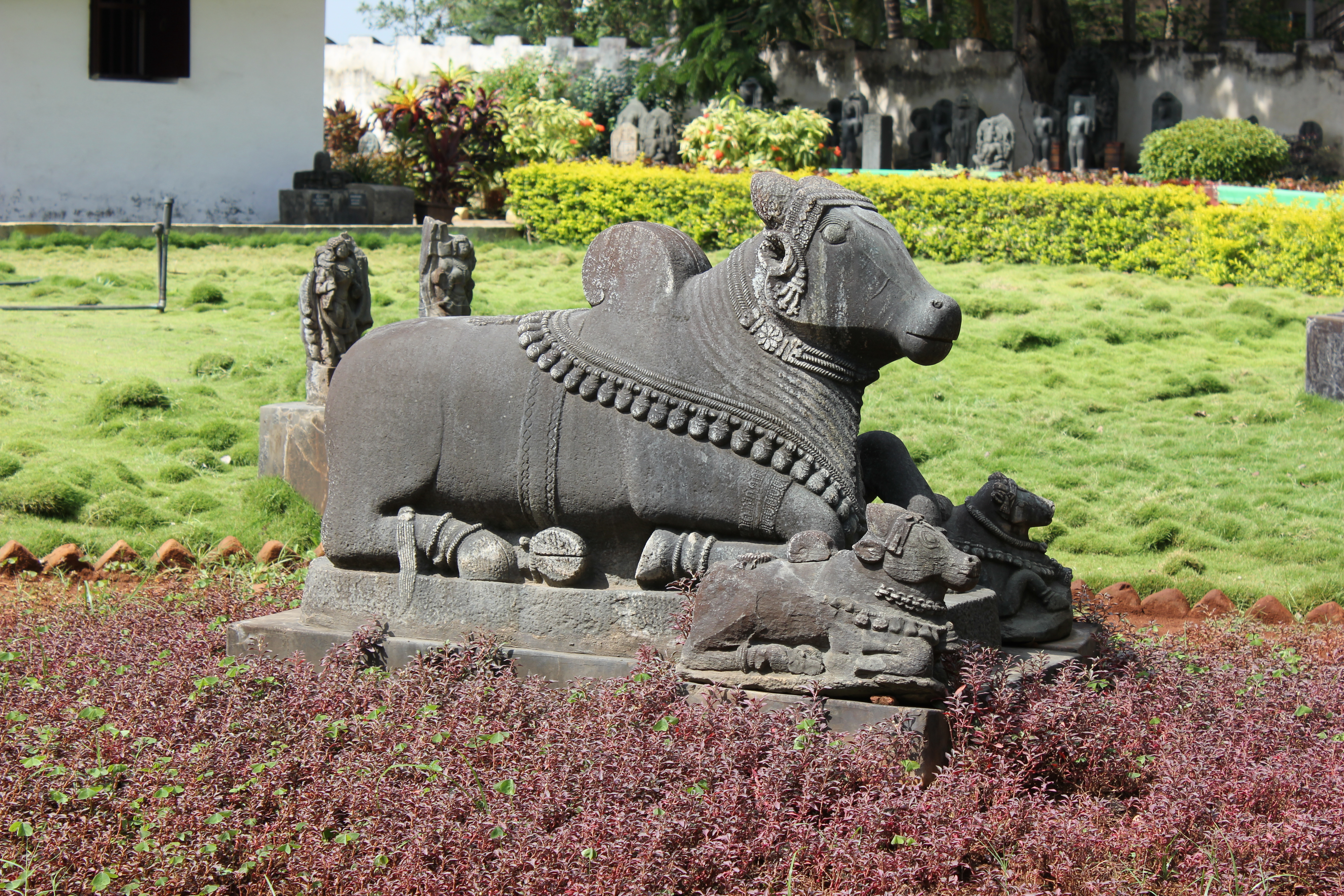
Sculpture of Nandi the bull.

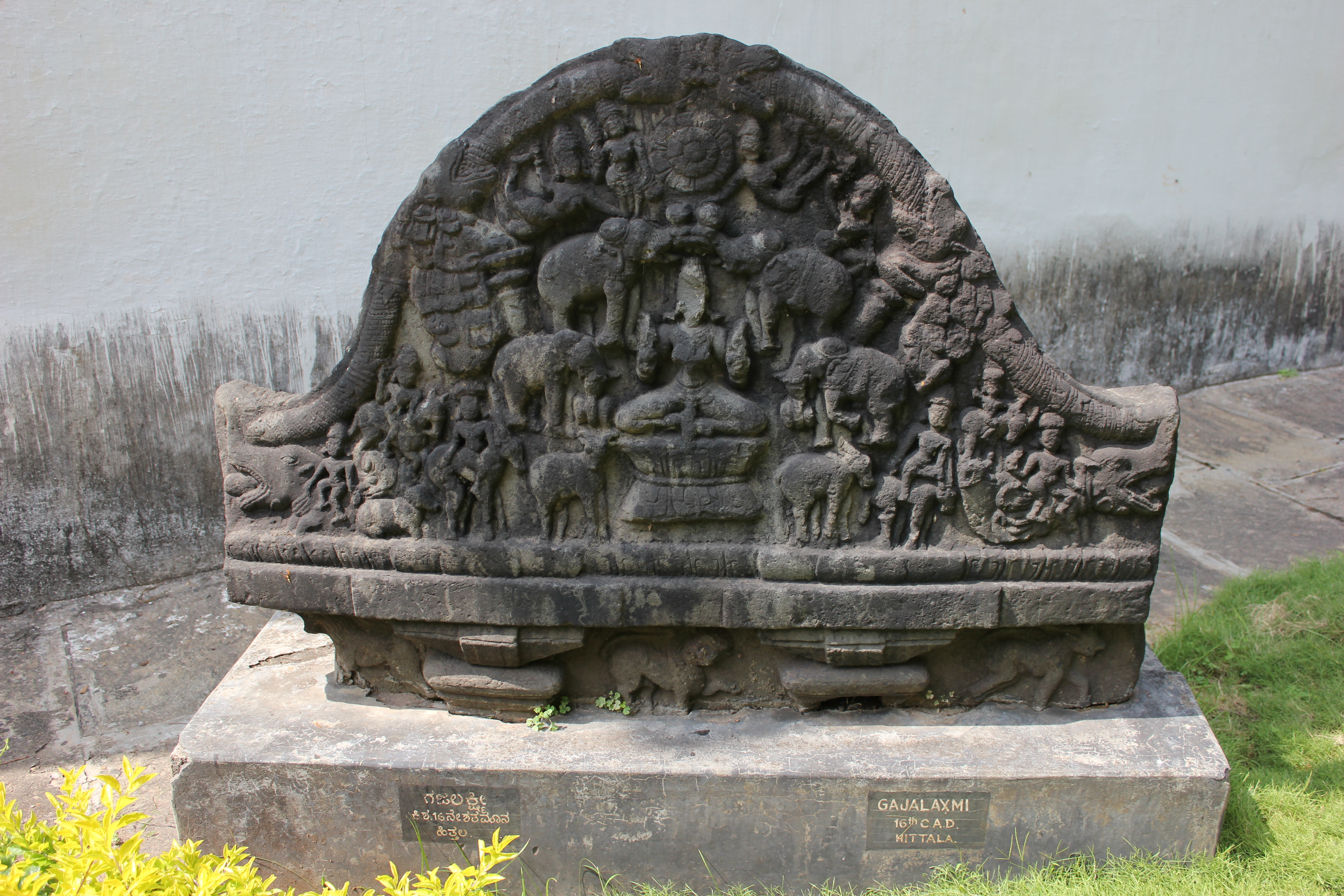
Relief sculpture of Gajalakshmi dated to the 16th century from Hittala.

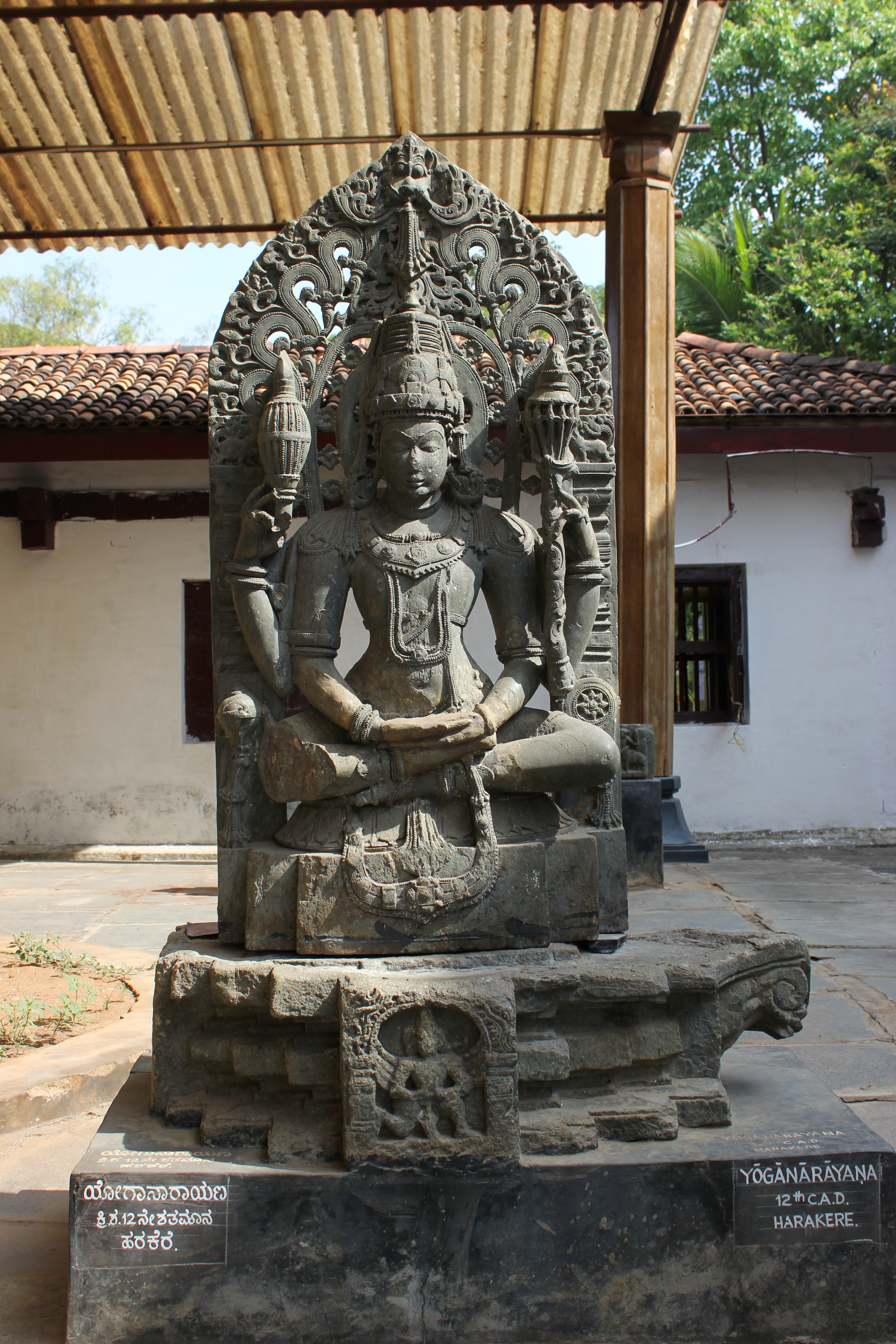
Yoga Narasimha sculpture from the 12th century from Harakere.

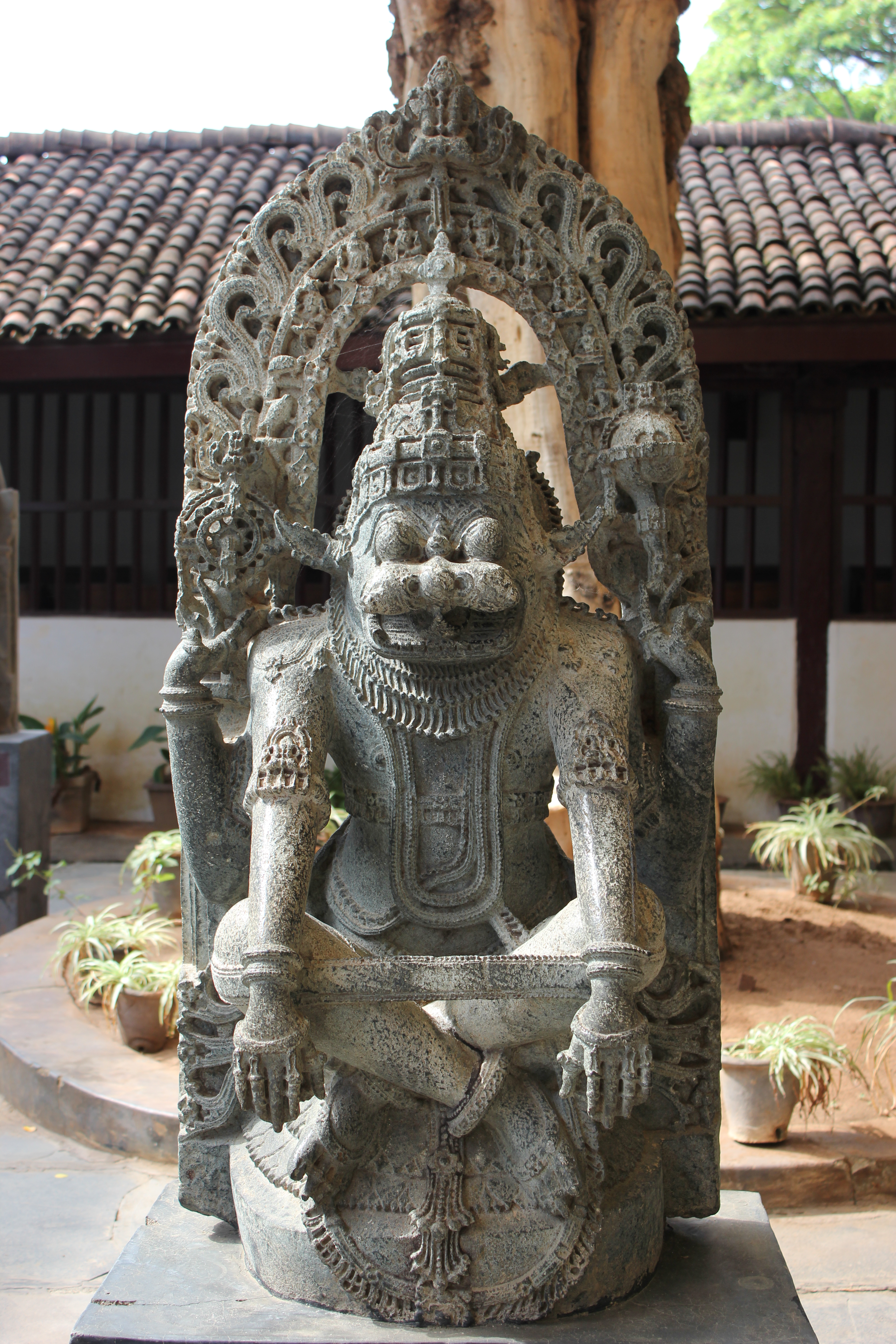
Ugra-Narasimha sculpture.

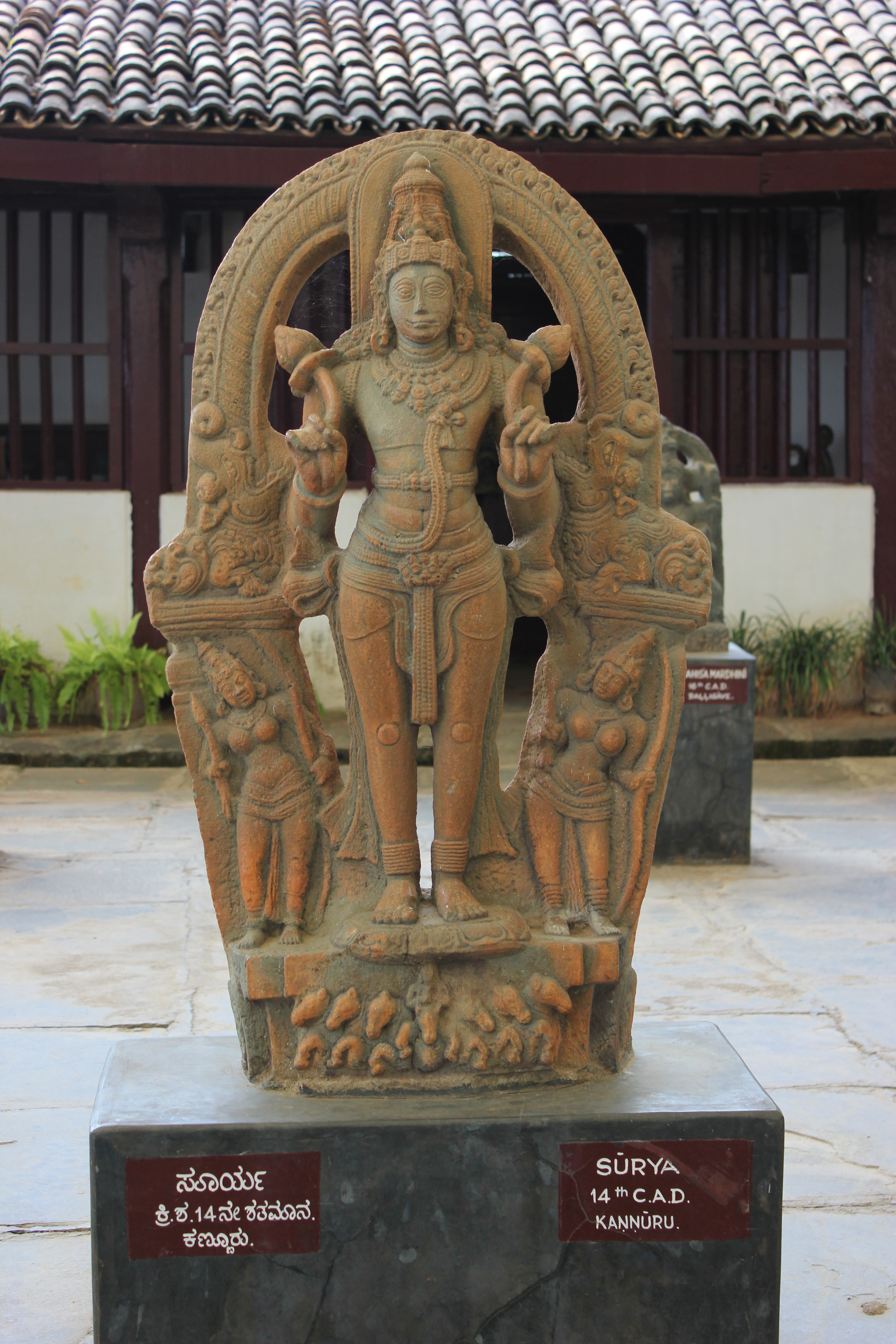
Sculpture of Surya the sun god dated to the 14th century from Kannuru.

=== Jain Sculptures ===
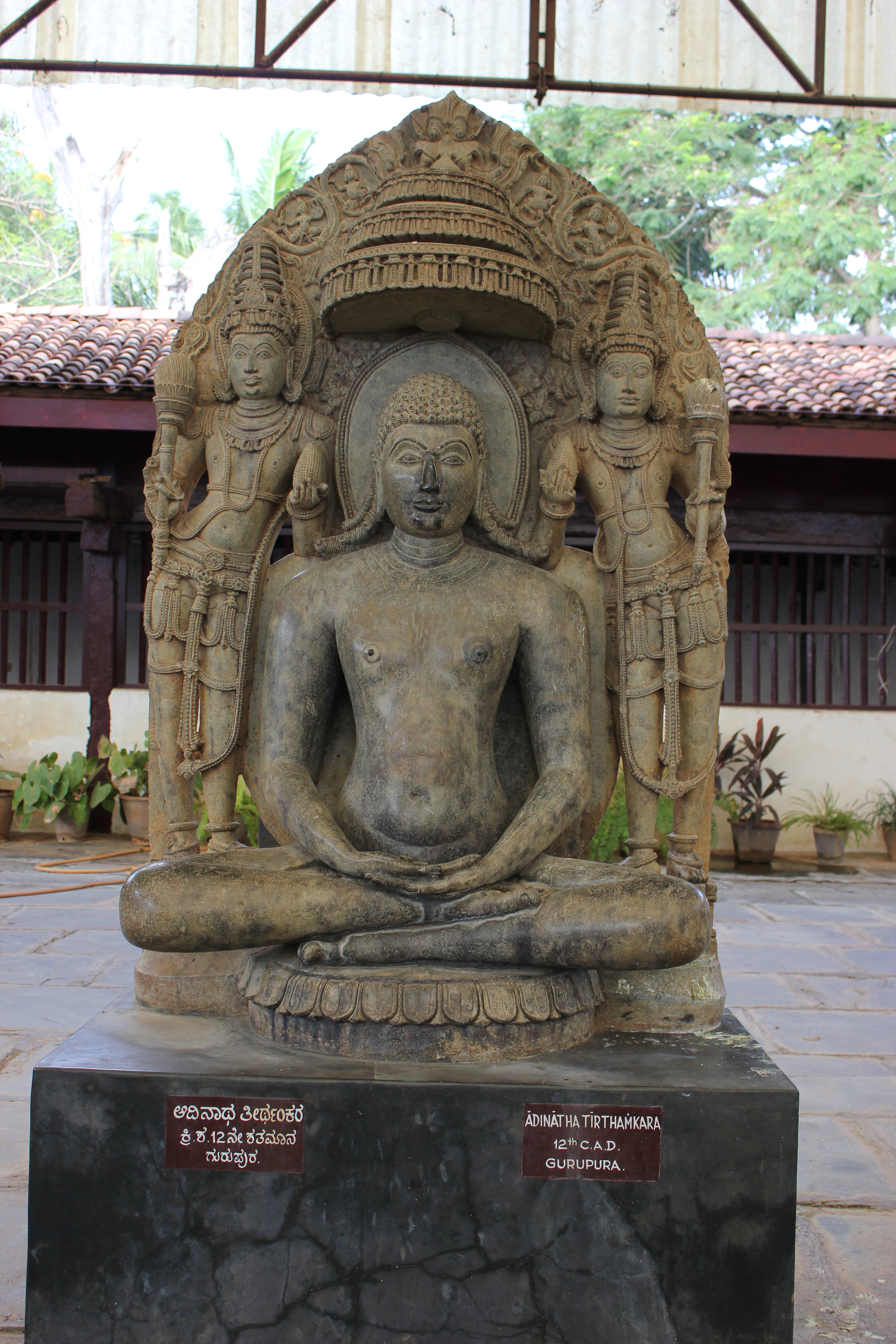
Sculpture dated 12th century of Adinath Tirtankar from Gurupura in the Shivappa Nayaka Palace in Shivamogga

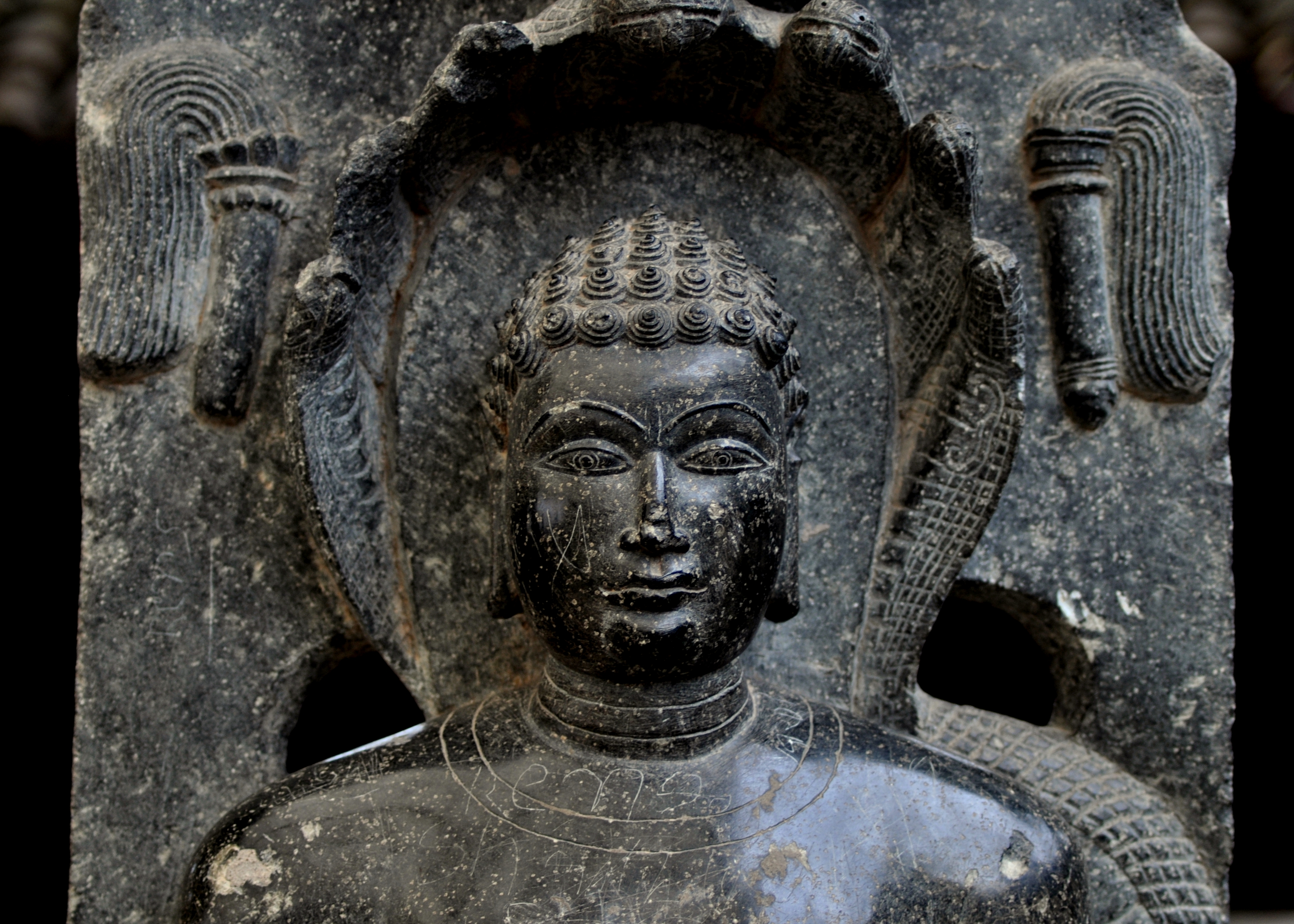
Sculpture of Parshvanatha

=== Hero Stones ===
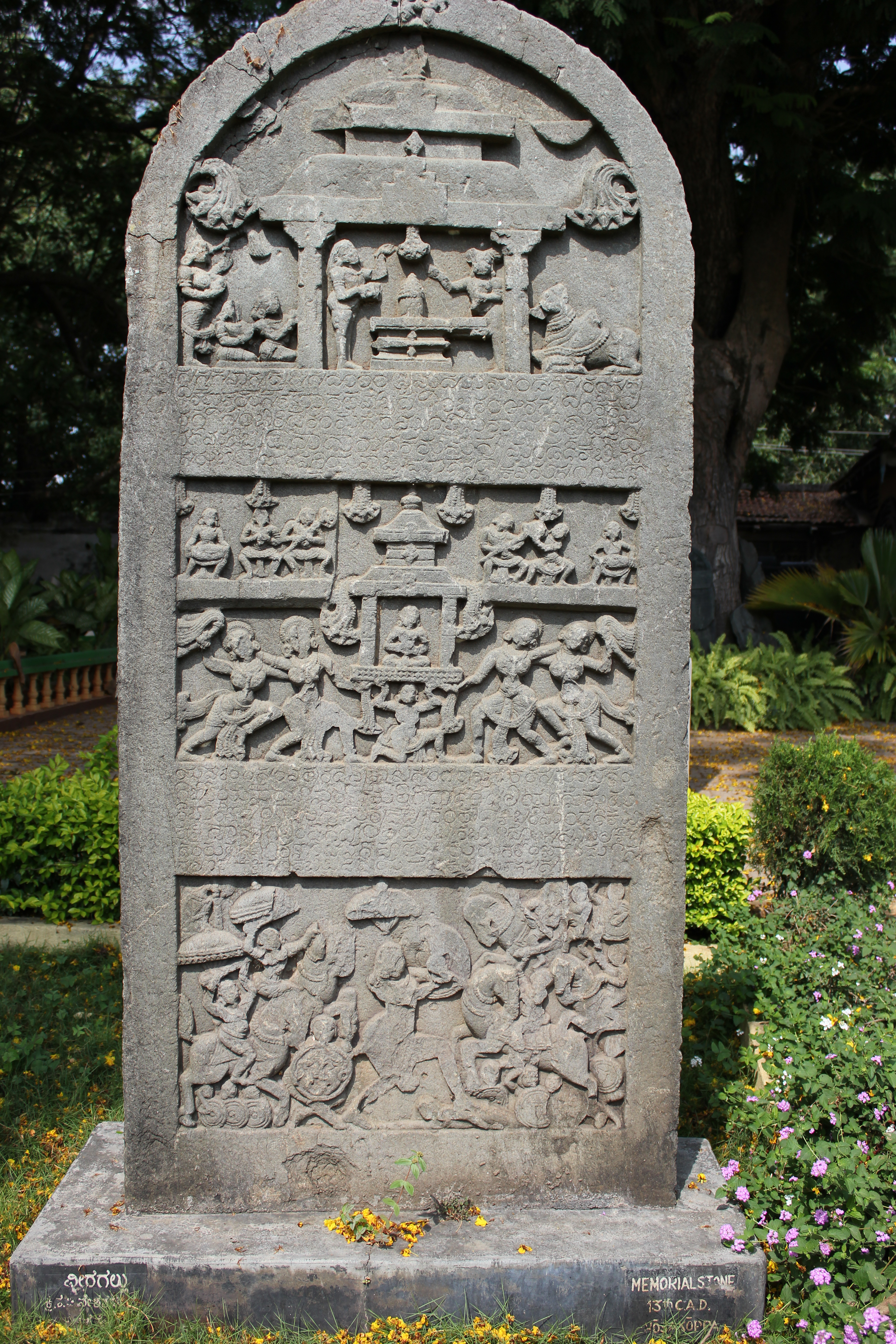
Hero stone with 13th century old Kannada inscription at the Shivappa Nayaka Palace grounds

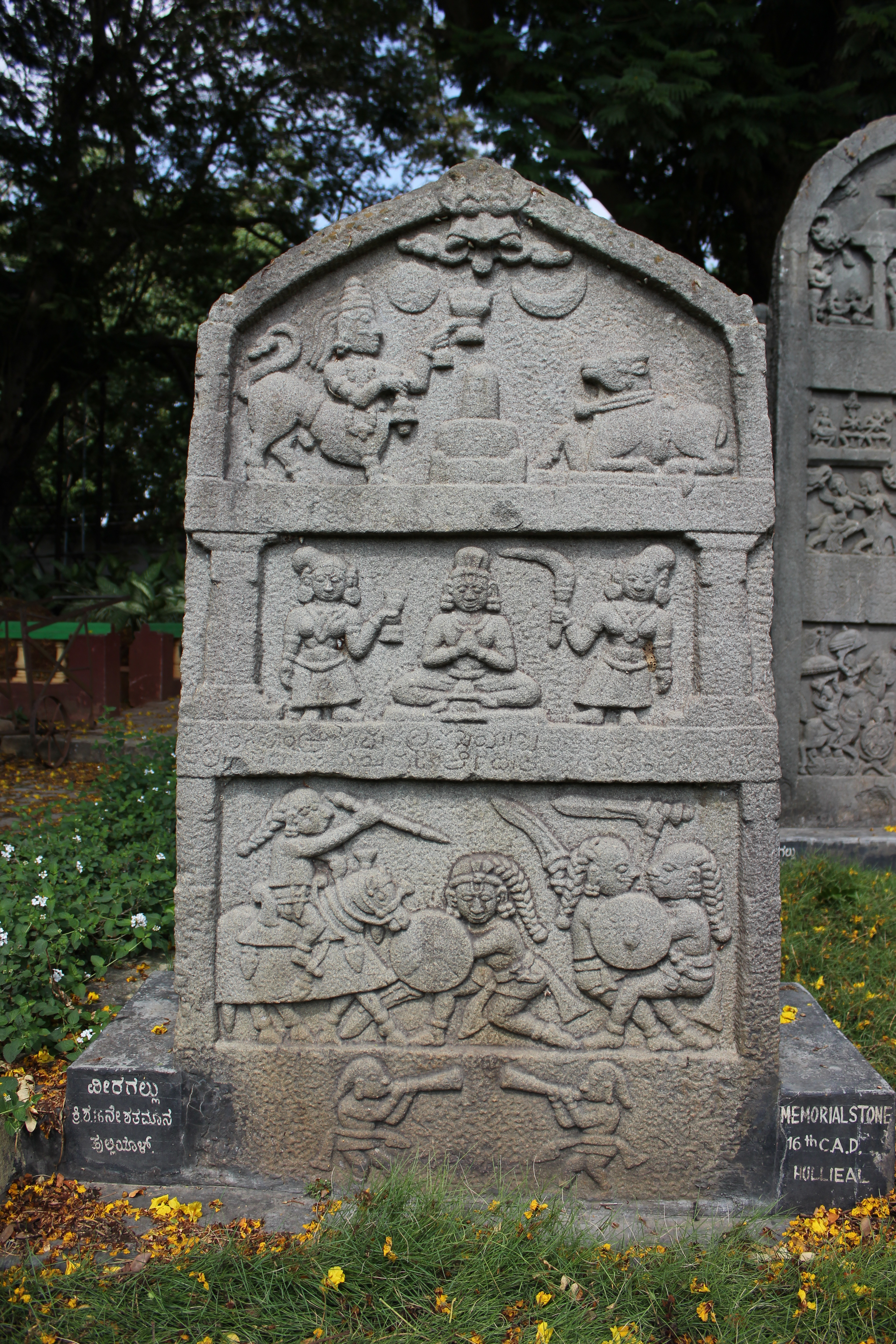
Hero stone with 16th century Kannada inscription at the Shivappa Nayaka Palace grounds

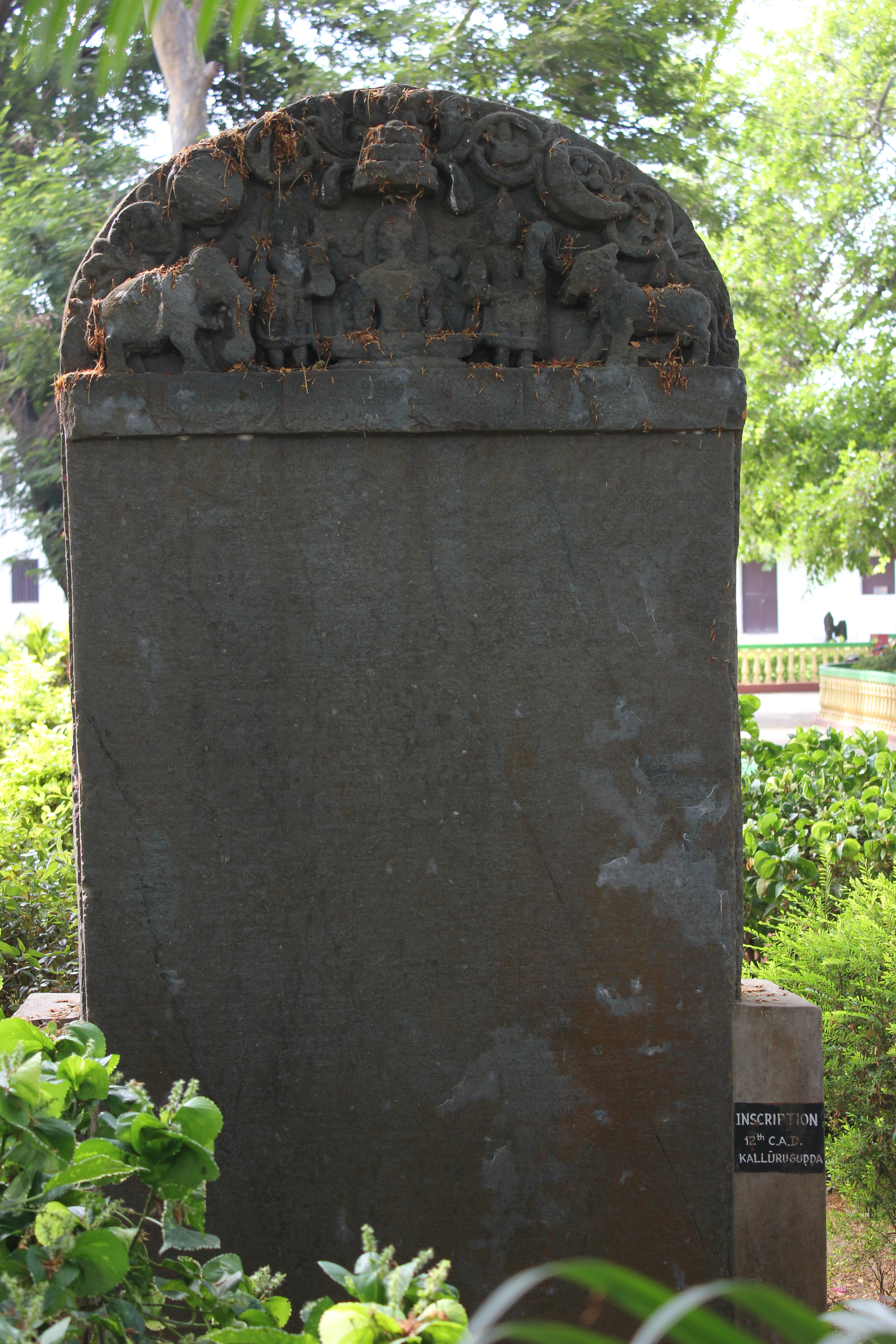
Old Kannada inscription of the 12th century from Kallurugudda on display at the Shivappa Nayaka Palace grounds
