= Kotturu, Karnataka =

Town in Karnataka, India

Kotturu Shikhapura
- Town
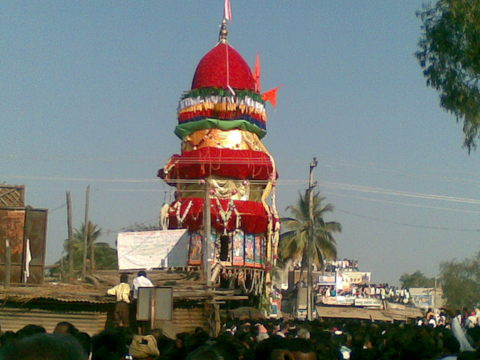
- Kottur Rathotsava festival
- Nickname: Shikhapura
- Location in Karnataka, India
- Coordinates: 14.817°N 76.217°E
- Country: India
- State: Karnataka
- District: Vijayanagara

Government
  - Body: Town Panchayath

Area
  - Total: 35.26 km^{2} (13.61 sq mi)
- Elevation: 586 m (1,923 ft)

Population (2011)
  - Total: 26,289
  - Density: 745.6/km^{2} (1,931/sq mi)

Languages
  - Official: Kannada
- Time zone: UTC+5:30 (IST)
- PIN: 583 134
- Telephone code: 08391

Kotturu is a town and taluk located in the Vijayanagara district of Karnataka, India. It is known as the home of Guru Kottureshwara, a 15th-century Shaivite saint. Every year, more than 200,000 devotees gather to participate in the car festival (Rathotsava) held in February.

Kotturu is known for a popular dish called mandakki-menasinakayi, a combination of puffed rice mixed with savouries, served with chili pepper fritters. The chillies are slit lengthwise, stuffed with a mixture of salt and crushed cumin, dipped in lentil batter, and deep-fried.

Historically, Kotturu was known for its cotton ginning industry and as the terminus of a railway line from Hospet. In 2019, this railway line was extended to Harihara and upgraded to broad gauge.

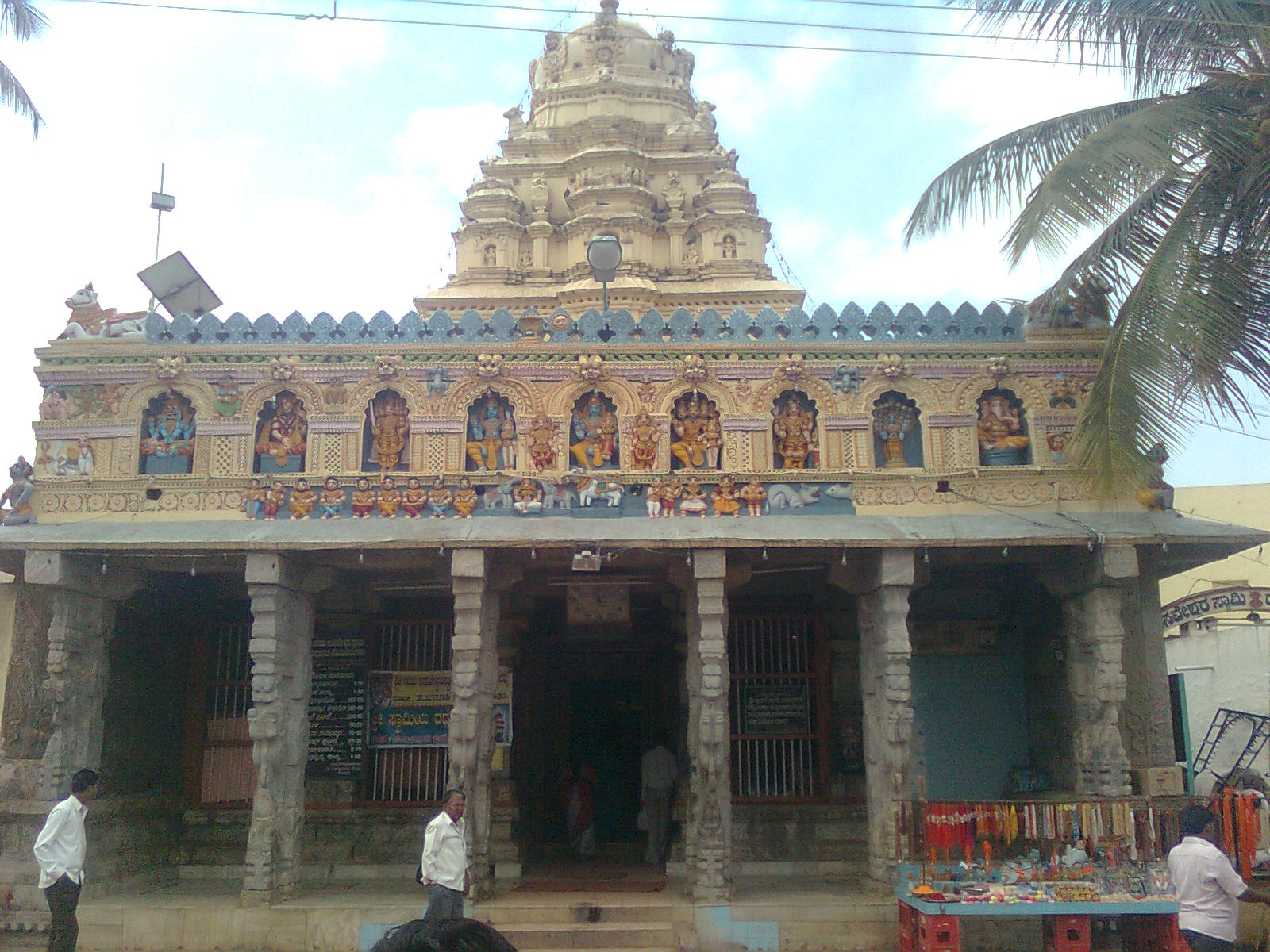
A temple in Kotturu

== History ==
Kotturu is named after Saint Kottureshwara, and its history is closely tied to the life and teachings of Guru Kottureshwara. According to legend, when the Lingayath Dharma began leaning towards the Vedic Sanatana style, Lord Kottureshwara dedicated his life to refining the faith and spreading awareness about Basavadi Pranitha Sharana Dharma. He aimed to educate people about Shatsthala and Ashtavarana. For this reason, devotees refer to him as Ashtavarana Tatvopadeshi Guru. It is believed that he embraced everyone in his heart and resolved their problems.

The Virasaiva religion was introduced by Lord Basavanna in the 12th century, and Lord Kottureshwara continued the sharana parampara (spiritual lineage) established by Basavanna and the sharanas. The name "Kottureshwara" is derived from the Kannada words Kottu or Kodu (meaning "give") and Eshwar (meaning "God"), forming Kottureshwara (Kodu + Eshwar = Kottureshwara).

Little is known about the birth and childhood of Lord Kottureshwara, but it is said that he arrived in Shikhapura at a young age and traveled extensively, from North Kashmir to Kanyakumari.

During the reign of Emperor Akbar in Delhi, a miraculous incident is believed to have occurred. Lord Kottureshwara is said to have appeared in the bedroom of Akbar’s wife as an old saint and blessed her. Hearing about the presence of the old man, a guard informed the emperor. Enraged, Akbar rushed to the queen’s bedroom and found a middle-aged man sleeping on the queen’s bed. While the queen perceived Kottureshwara as a saint, Akbar saw him as an ordinary man.

In his anger, Akbar attacked Kottureshwara with his sword, but to his amazement, the sword turned into a garland of flowers. Realising his mistake, Akbar surrendered to Lord Kottureshwara, who then blessed both Akbar and the Rajput queen. As a gesture of reverence, Akbar gifted his sword and the cot on which Lord Kottureshwara had been resting. This cot is still preserved at the Gachchina Mutt in Kotturu. Additionally, Akbar granted Lord Kottureshwara the independent territory of Sarsipura or Shikhapura, which was under his rule.

Lord Kottureshwara's temples in Kottur are divided into four shrines:

1. Murkalmutt (3 stone shrine)
2. Thotalmutt (shrine with cradle)
3. Darbarmutt or Doddamutt (king’s assembly shrine or big shrine)
4. Gachina mutt (shrine where the saint meditates to return to Kailasa)

The first mutt is where Lord Kottureshwara first appeared in the land of Kotturu. The second mutt is where the Lord blessed a child. The third mutt is where he used to give sadare (preaching on religion) and solve the problems of the people. The fourth mutt is where Guru Kottureshwara entered Ikya Stala, the final stage of Shudstala (Yoga Samadhi).

There is another story related to the Gachhina Mutt. Earlier, it was a temple dedicated to Lord Veerabhadra. As people began visiting Lord Kottureshwara to seek blessings, the worship of Lord Veerabhadra started to decline. Lord Veerabhadra complained about this to Lord Kottureshwara. In response, the Guru advised him to occupy another place called Kodathgudda, where the temple of Lord Veerabhadra is situated today. This is also a well-known and equally revered temple in the region.

Lord Kottureshwara once visited a village near Mysuru and noticed the devotion of a priest at the Karilingeswara temple. He asked the priest to accompany him and become his disciple, as well as the priest of the temple in Kotturu. There is also a saying that Lord Kottureshwara instructed that only children from the priest's family should serve as priests for future generations. To support the priest’s family, a piece of land was given in a nearby village called K. Ayyanahalli, where a temple dedicated to Karilingeswara stands. Some of the priest's descendants continue to perform worship at the Hiremath and reside in this village.

In memory of Lord Kottureshwara, devotees often name their sons as Kotresh and their daughters as Kotturamma. These names are commonly found in and around Kotturu.

An annual fair is held just before Maha Shivaratri, attracting devotees from all over to witness the fair and the car festival. Some devotees even walk to Kotturu from their native places. Additionally, Karthikotsava is celebrated in the month of December.

There is a temple dedicated to Kotturamma (Parvathi) on the outskirts of Kotturu. Kotturamma is not the wife or related to Lord Kottureshwara but is a form of Goddess Parvathi. An annual festival is held in August, during which lakhs of people attend. Bhadrashhetty Sanna Rudrappa, Gorali Sharanappa, and Dr. Alabur Nanjappa are a few of the freedom fighters from this region.

== Geography ==
Kotturu is located at 14.82°N 76.22°E. It has an average elevation of 587 metres (1,925 feet).

== Demographics ==
As of 2001 Indian census, Kotturu had a population of 22,667. Males constitute 52% of the population, while females make up 48%. Kotturu has an average literacy rate of 69%, which is higher than the national average of 59.5%. The male literacy rate is 76%, and the female literacy rate is 61%. In Kotturu, 12% of the population is under the age of 6.

== Transport ==
Currently, Several trains passing through Kotturu, which connects

•Bellary to Davanagere,

•Mysore to Ajmer Weekly Express,

•Hospete Arasikere Special Demu Passenger,

•Hospete Harihara Demu and another one express train running daily from •Vijayapura to Yeshwanthpur via Hosapete, Kotturu, Harapanahalli, and Davanagere.

It's connect to Kalyana Karnataka and Uttara Karnataka Both.
