= Shivappa Nayaka =

Indian monarch (1618–1663)

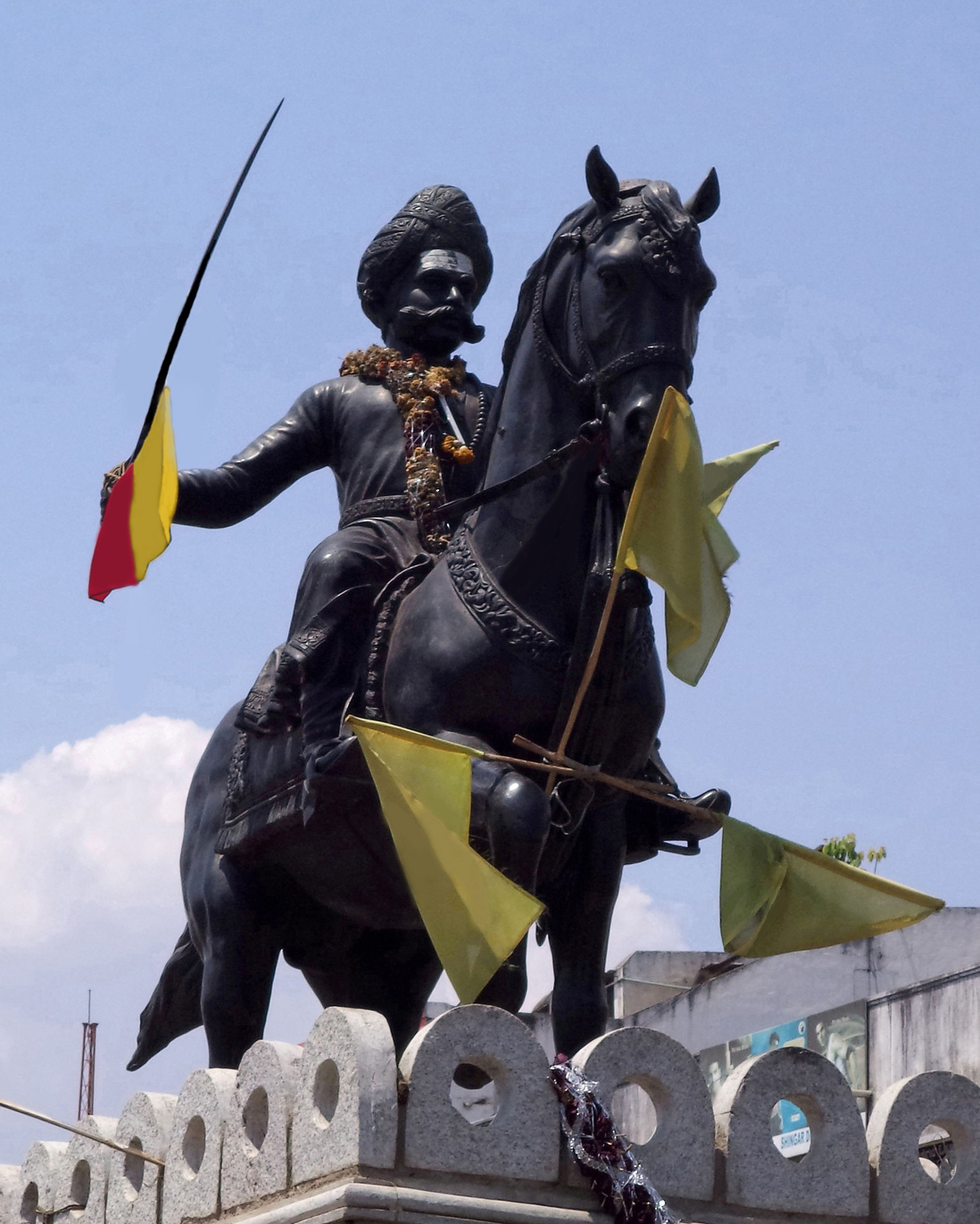
- Statue of Keladi Shivappa Nayaka at Shivamogga
- Reign: 1645–1660
- Predecessor: Virabhadra Nayaka
- Successor: Chikka Venkatappa Nayaka
- Died: 25 September 1660
- Religion: Hinduism

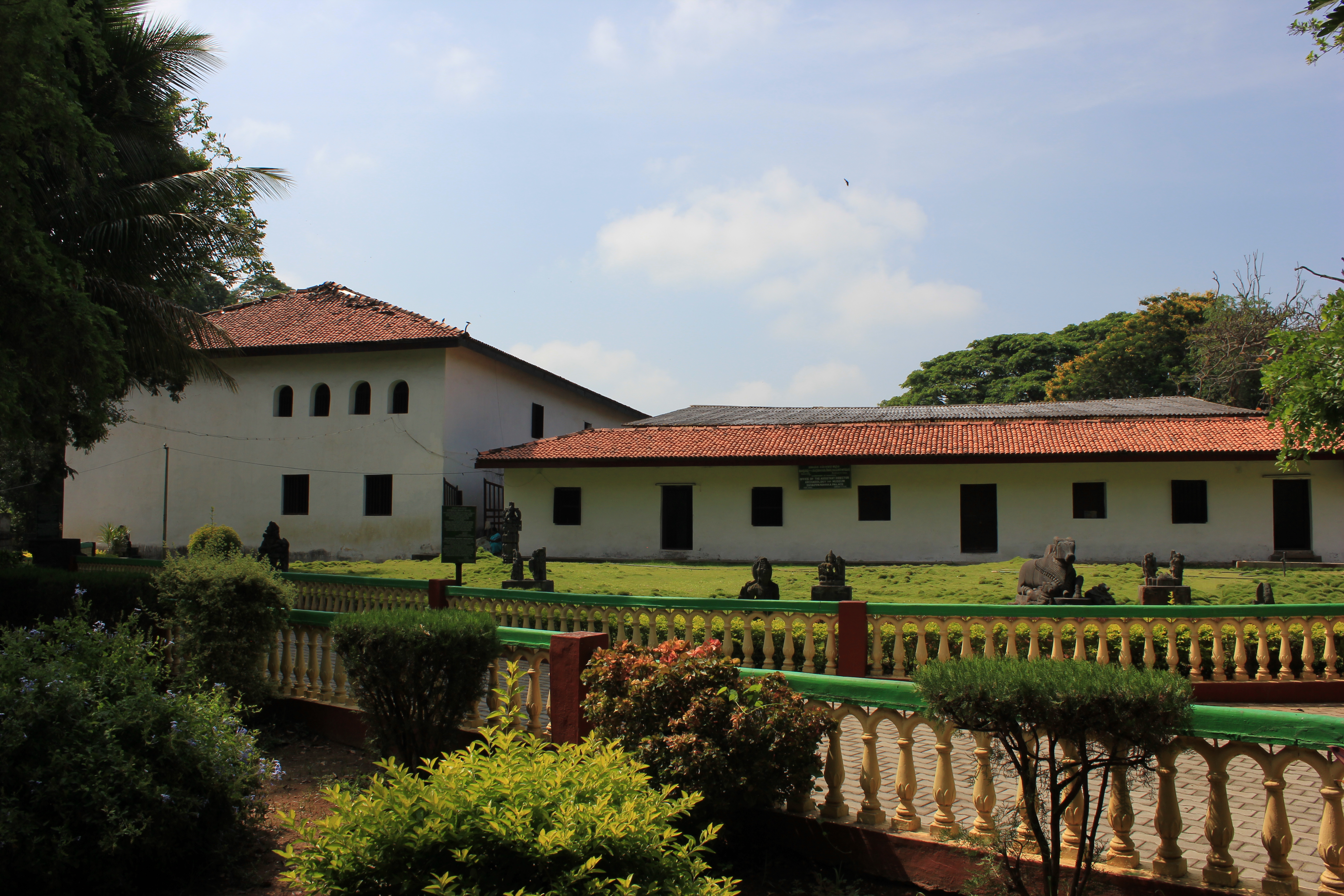
Shivappa Nayaka's palace, Shivamogga, Karnataka

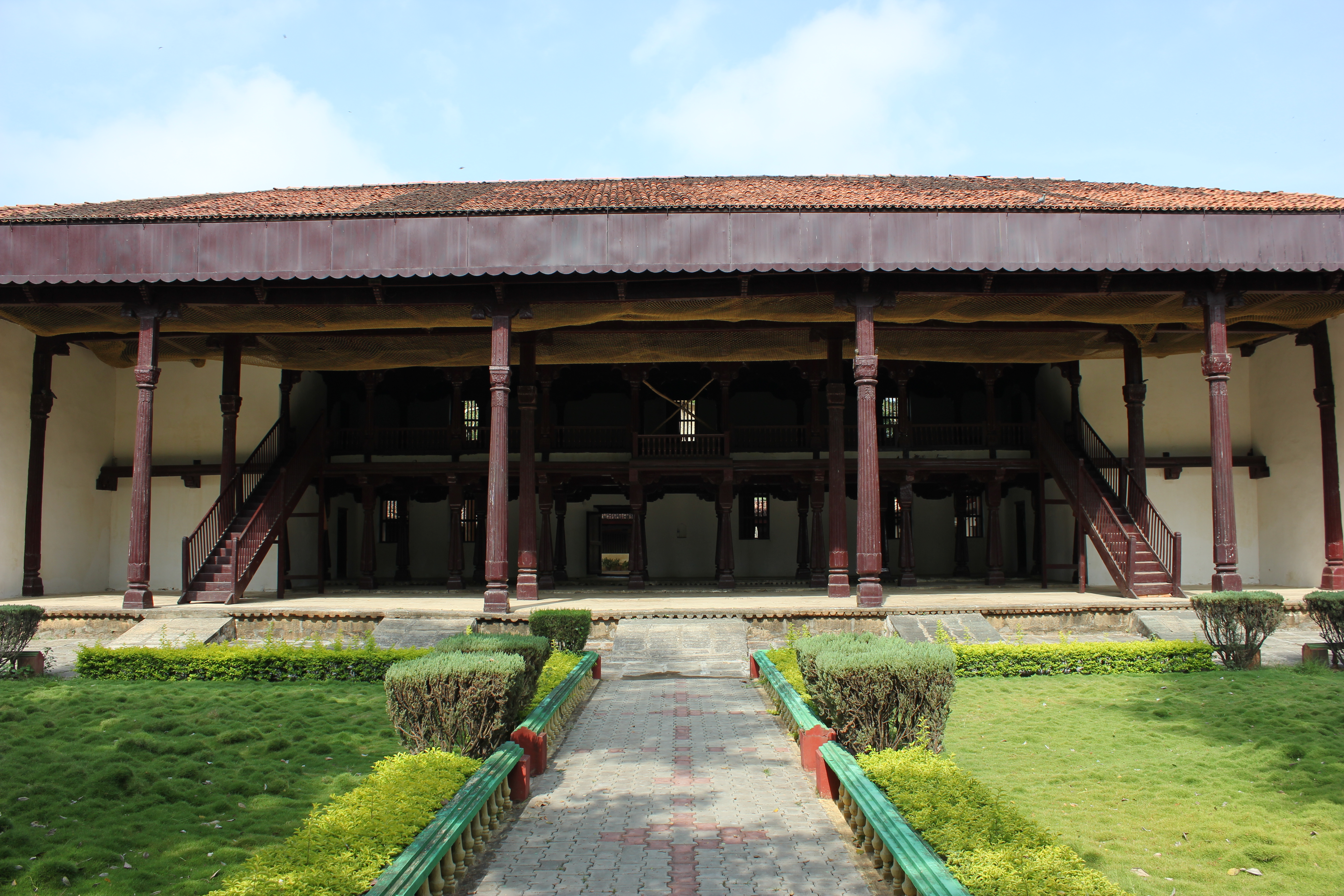
Front view of the Shivappa Nayaka palace

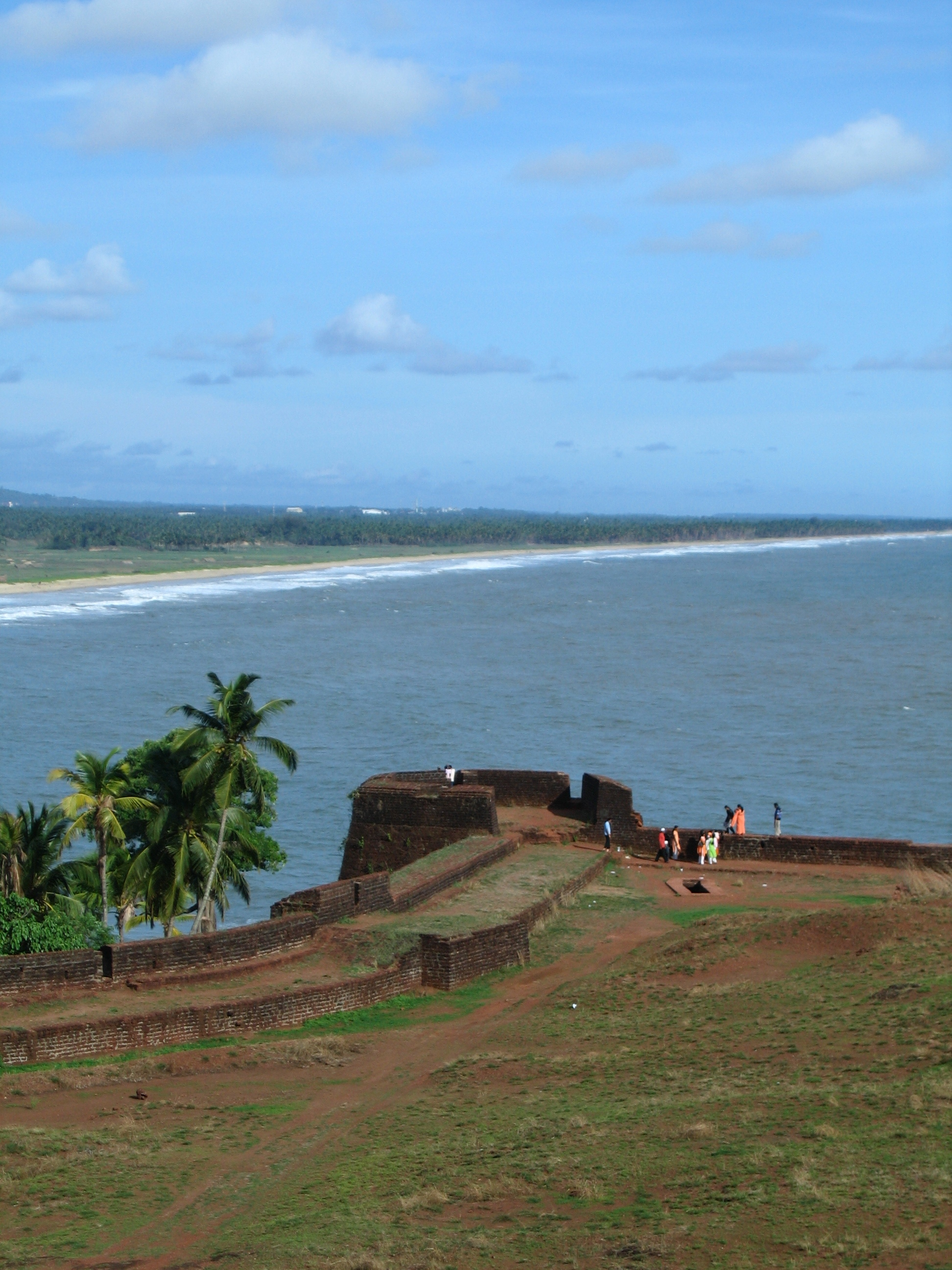
The famous Bekal Fort at Kasargod in Malabar, was built by Shivappa Nayaka

Shivappa Nayaka (Kannada: ಶಿವಪ್ಪ ನಾಯಕ, 1618 – 25 September 1660), popularly known as Keladi Shivappa Nayaka, was an Indian king and ruler of the Keladi Nayaka Kingdom. The Keladi Nayakas were successors of the Vijayanagara Empire in the coastal and Malnad (hill) districts of Karnataka, India, in the late 16th century. He was known as Sistina Shivappa Nayaka because he introduced a tax system called Sist.

== Conquests ==
Shivappa Nayaka is remembered as an able administrator and soldier. He ascended the throne in 1645. During this time, the last ruler of the diminished Vijayanagara Empire ruling from Vellore, Shriranga Raya III was defeated by the Bijapur Sultanate and sought refuge with Shivappa. Shivappa not only gave him refuge, but gave him charge of Belur and Sakrepatna.

The growing threat of the Portuguese was eliminated by 1653 and the ports of Mangalore, Kundapura and Honnavar were brought under Keladi control. Having conquered the Kanara coast, he marched down to Kasargod region of modern Kerala and installed a pillar of victory at Neeleeswaram. The forts of Chandragiri, Bekal, Adka Fort, Arikady Fort and Mangalore were built by Shivappa Nayaka.

After securing the coastal regions, in 1654 he invaded north of the Tungabhadra river and captured territory in the modern Dharwad district from the Bijapur Sultanate. In 1659, he invaded the south and laid siege to Srirangapatna in modern Mysore district, however an epidemic broke out in his army forcing him to withdraw. In the south, he destroyed the Portuguese political power in the Kanara region by capturing all the Portuguese forts of the coastal region.

The kingdom of the Nayakas of Keladi reached its peak during the rule of Shivappa Nayaka, comprising the coastal, hill and some interior districts (Bayaluseeme) of modern Karnataka.

== Administrator ==
Shivappa Nayaka introduced a revenue settlement scheme called Sist, a policy that has found favourable comparison to revenue schemes formulated by the Mogul emperor Akbar. According to this scheme, agricultural lands were divided into five types depending on the type of soil and available irrigational facilities. A unit of sowing capacity called Khanduga was developed and every irrigable land was taxed in varying amounts based on this unit. The rate of taxation depended on the yield in each one of these five types of land, the rate varying from village to village and amounting to a third of the total yield. Shivappa Nayaka gave importance to agriculture which resulted in an expanding agrarian economy.

Ujjaini peeta was Rajaguru to Keladi dynasty. A religious and tolerant man, Shivappa Nayaka performed padapooja of Jangams and built many Veerashaiva maths and also Vedic sacrifices and rituals and patronised the Hindu Advaita order of Sringeri. He was tolerant towards Christians and gave them land to cultivate. He encouraged the mercantile communities of South India such as the Komatis and Konkanis to settle down and establish businesses in his kingdom.

An interesting episode from the time of Shivappa Nayaka's rule goes as follows. A poor Brahmin named Ganesh Mallya came to Keladi, the capital city, with the intention of finding a job. Having no money, he carried a bag full of home-grown coconuts. Before entering the city, every traveller had to pass through eight toll gates, each of which collected a tax. Because he carried no cash, Ganesh Mallya had to part with two coconuts at each toll gate, one as tax and the other as a gift to the official. He also paid with two coconuts at the city entrance. Frustrated with all the tolls, Mallya boldly set up his own toll gate (the ninth toll gate) and collected a toll after registering full details of travellers into the city in his own register. In return for the toll, Ganesh Mallya handed out a receipt with a note new custom station for eighteen coconuts, signature of Ganeshayya Raja of Kumta. This went on unnoticed for eighteen months before King Shivappa Nayaka heard of it. When summoned by the king, Ganesh Mallya admitted he had collected an illegal toll to make a livelihood. Impressed by his honesty and business acumen, Shivappa Nayaka took Ganesh Mallya into his service.

Shivappa Nayaka died in 1663–64. His son and successor Soma Shekhar was murdered by his Brahmins and his grandson Basava was set up on the throne under the regency of his mother.
