= Chakkala Nair =

Intermediate Nair sub-caste

Chakkala Nair, also known as Vattakkat Nair, and Vaniya Nair one of the intermediate subcastes of the Nair community. They are distributed throughout Kerala. In Travancore, they are known as Chakkala, while in Cochin and Malabar they are Vattakattu and In the extreme north of Malabar they are called Vaniya.

The Chakkala Nairs traditionally engaged in the hereditary occupations of oil trading, oil mongers for temples and illoms and village teaching. In addition to these roles, they were also trained as soldiers, and when conflict arose, they were duty-bound to abandon their usual occupations, arm themselves, and serve their respective kings in battle.

Vattakattu Nairs is a Forward caste and are now part of the mainstream Nair caste, while vaniya nairs and chakkala nairs were recently added to the central OBC category and get a minimal reservation of 3% sharing with 70 other castes on a rotational basis.

It was the duty of Peru Vaniyan Nambiar section among Vaniya nairs in Kurumbranad to present the Kurumbranad Raja with oil on the occasion of his formal installation. Vaniya Nairs also held Achan title For example, Kunjikannan Ezhuthachan, a Vaniya Nair, was conferred the title "Nambrath Achan," by the kolathiri where Nambram refers to a place.

Vattakkat Nairs were the hereditary Velichappadu of traditional Nambudiri-led Bhagavathi Temples in Kerala and even held priesthood roles in some temples, such as the famous Kadakkal Devi Temple, where a Chakkala Nair with the title Nettur Kurup serves as the head priest.

Muchilot Bhagavthi is the patron deity of Vaniya Nairs and the community serve as the Uralars (custodian) of 108 Muchilot Bhagavathi temples spread across North Malabar from Tulu Nadu to Kozhikode resembling the 108 Shiva Temples mentioned in the Shivalaya Stothram. It is believed that Bhagavathi first manifested herself to Muchilot PadaNair, a chieftain of Mushika dynasty from the Vaniya nair sect.

According to eminent scholars Thunchaththu Ezhuthachan was born in a Chakkala Nair family of Thrikkandiyoor Amsam in Vettathunadu. The Nair family descendants of Ezhuthachan continue to reside in Amakavu, situated in the Palakkad district.

Historically, the Chakkala Nair community fostered inter-religious harmony by engaging with various groups, including the Jacobite Syrian Church. A notable example of this is during the Saint Baselios Yeldo festival day, when a Chakkala Nair youth would carry the church's traditional lamp, leading the 'Rassa'—the customary church procession—to the church, symbolizing unity and mutual respect.

== See also ==
- chettiar
- Pallicchan Nair
- Swaroopathil Nair
- Nambiar (Nair subcaste)
- Padamangalam Nair
- Veluthedath Nair
