= Pallicchan Nair =

Intermediate sub-caste

Pallichan Nair is an intermediate Nair subcaste seen predominantly in Malabar and Cochin areas. They are found in Travancore in very low numbers. They are the palanquin / pallak bearers for the ruling dynasties, at some places for the Jenmi Namboothiris and Nair chieftains. Today, two sub-castes among the Nairs, Pallichan and Maniyani, are theyyam worshippers, and they have their own shrines for their theyyams.

Pallichan and Vattakad were treated as an intermediate class.
