= Maniyani =

Yadava community of Kerala, India

Maniyani Nair മണിയാണി നായർ
- Classification: Lunar dynasty
- Religions: Hinduism India
- Populated states: Kerala • Puduchery
- Related groups: Nair • Nambiar

The Maniyani Nair (also known as Kolaya, Kolari, Ayar, Konar, Urali Nair in different areas) is a Malayalam speaking community, and Nair sub-caste native to Kerala state of South India. They are mainly distributed in Kannur and Kasaragod districts. They are a pastoral community and their traditional occupation is tending cattle and cultivation. They are sometimes also referred as Itasseri Nairs. They are classified as OBC or Other backward Class by Kerala government

== Origin ==
The Maniyanis believe themselves to have descended from the ancient Yadava clan. It is believed that from Gokarnam, a group of those who set out for various parts of India, reached the Kolat land and the Tulu land via Mangalore.

== Social life ==
The majority of the Maniyanis are concentrated in the districts of Kannur and Kasaragod. Today, two sub-castes among the Nairs, namely Pallichan and Maniyani, are theyyam worshippers, and they have their own shrines for their theyyams.
