= Gingee Venkataramana Temple =

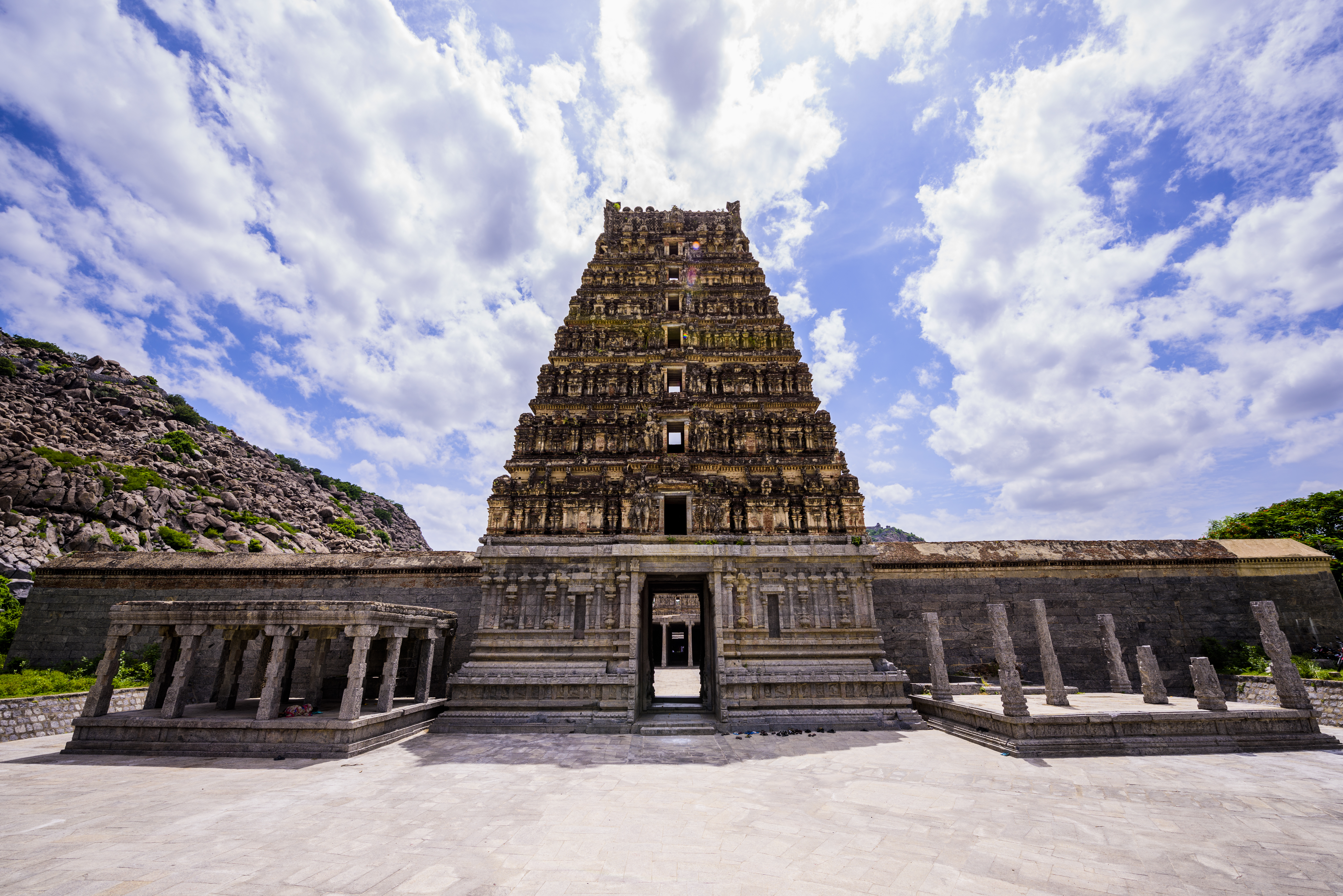

- Location in Tamil Nadu

Religion
- Affiliation: Hinduism
- District: Viluppuram
- Deity: Venkataramana (Venkateswara)

Location
- State: Tamil Nadu
- Country: India
- Coordinates: 12°14′50″N 79°24′12″E

Architecture
- Style: Vijayanagara architecture
- Creator: Muthyala Nayaka
- Established: 16th Century

The Gingee Venkataramana Temple, built in the 16th century is the largest temple in Gingee, in the Viluppuram district of Tamil Nadu. It was built by Muthyala Nayaka (Muthialu Nayakan) (1540 - 1550 CE) of Nayaks of Gingee and dedicated to Venkateshwara.

== History ==
The ruins of the Venkataramana temple is located in the outer lower fort inside the Gingee Fort complex. Parts of the temple were dismantled by different personages. In 1761 CE, when Gingee fell to French occupation, many tall graceful monolithic ornamental pillars were dismantled from this temple and taken to Pondicherry to be set around the base of the statue of Governor Dupleix. Later, in 1860 CE, a Jain official in the Madras Provincial Services, Sri Baliah, facilitated the dismantling of several stone-pieces including the great stone elephants from the Gingee Venkataramana temple, to make edifices in the Sittamur Jain temple. The successor of Muthialu Nayaka, named Venkatappa Nayaka, had permitted a Jain merchant to build the Sittamur shrine.

== Architecture ==
The temple is a large, well-planned structure of mostly a single phase of construction. The temples's most admirable carvings are found in the panels located on either side of the entrance gateway depicting Ramayana scenes, Vishnu's incarnations and the puranic legend of samudra manthan. To its west lies the Anaikulam tank used for bathing elephants, further west to which are the famous tanks of Chakrakulam and the Chettikulam, fed by perennial springs which do not dry even in summer—a key feature of Senji being its water works with dams and canals constructed by Krishnappa Nayaka and his immediate successors.

The Chettikulam was built either in the 17th century by Rama Chetti or in the 18th century by Rama Shetty under the Maratha Kingdom. The Chakrakulam was constructed by Muthyala Nayaka, who also constructed a mandapa beside the Venkataramana temple on a road leading to the VarahaNadi and a temple of Chakraperumal on its bank. Raja Design's cremation site is near the Chettikulam. Near the Chakrakulam is a big natural boulder with a hollow which served as the prisoner's well into which the condemned were thrown.

To the east of the temple is the Kalyanamahal, an architectural treasure piece; which according to the MacKenzie manuscripts were built by one Krishnappa Nayaka, who was possibly Tubaki Krishnappa Nayaka. The attractive monument, built in the Vijayanagara style, is made up of a square court surrounded by rooms with verandahs on arches with stairways, in the middle of which is an 8-storey square tower with a pyramidal roof. The temple contains a number of inscriptions in Tamil which also refer to several structures built elsewhere in the Tamil country by other nayaks.

Shrines of Goddesses are placed in the western corners of the temple, each with a small mandapa with a pier having multiple colonettes while another shrine with Narasimha and Krishna carvings is placed away from the middle of the western wall.

== Other structures ==
The Venugopalaswami shrine is tucked away in one of the gateways of the inner fort, in a state of ruin and disrepair. Only a stone slab cut out on the side of a rock exists. It is a remarkable piece of sculpture in bold relief in which is carved a panel of Krishna, Rukmani and Satyabhama and two other female figures. The Jesuit traveller, Father Pimenta, who visited Gingee in 1599 AD mentions it in his accounts. The Pattabhirama shrine, (aka Pattabhiramaswami temple) situated at the foot of the Chakkali Durgam hill, also has several carvings of interest.

== In popular culture ==
The climax and a few action sequences of Akhanda, a 2021 Telugu-language film were shot here.

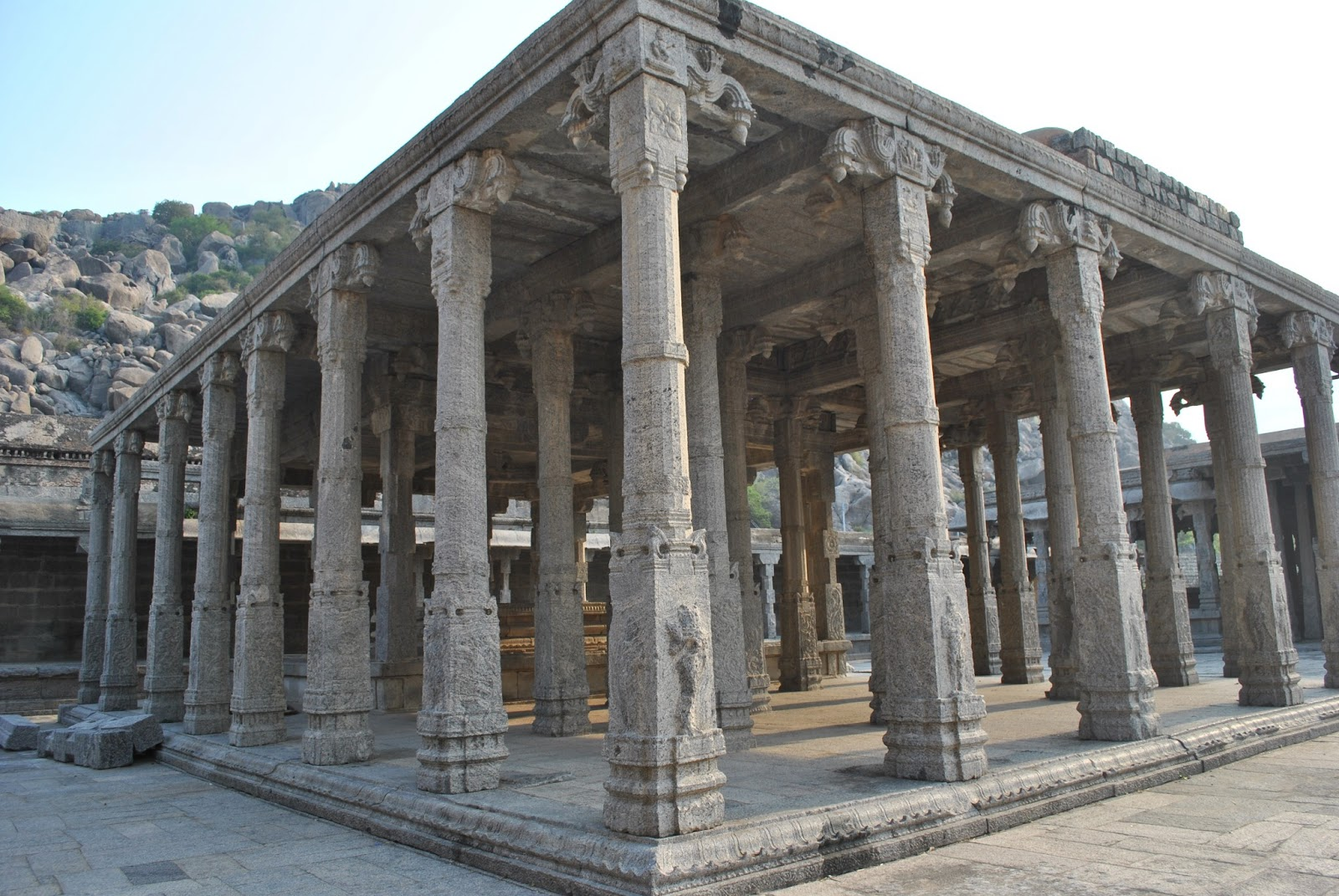
100 pilar mandapam of the temple

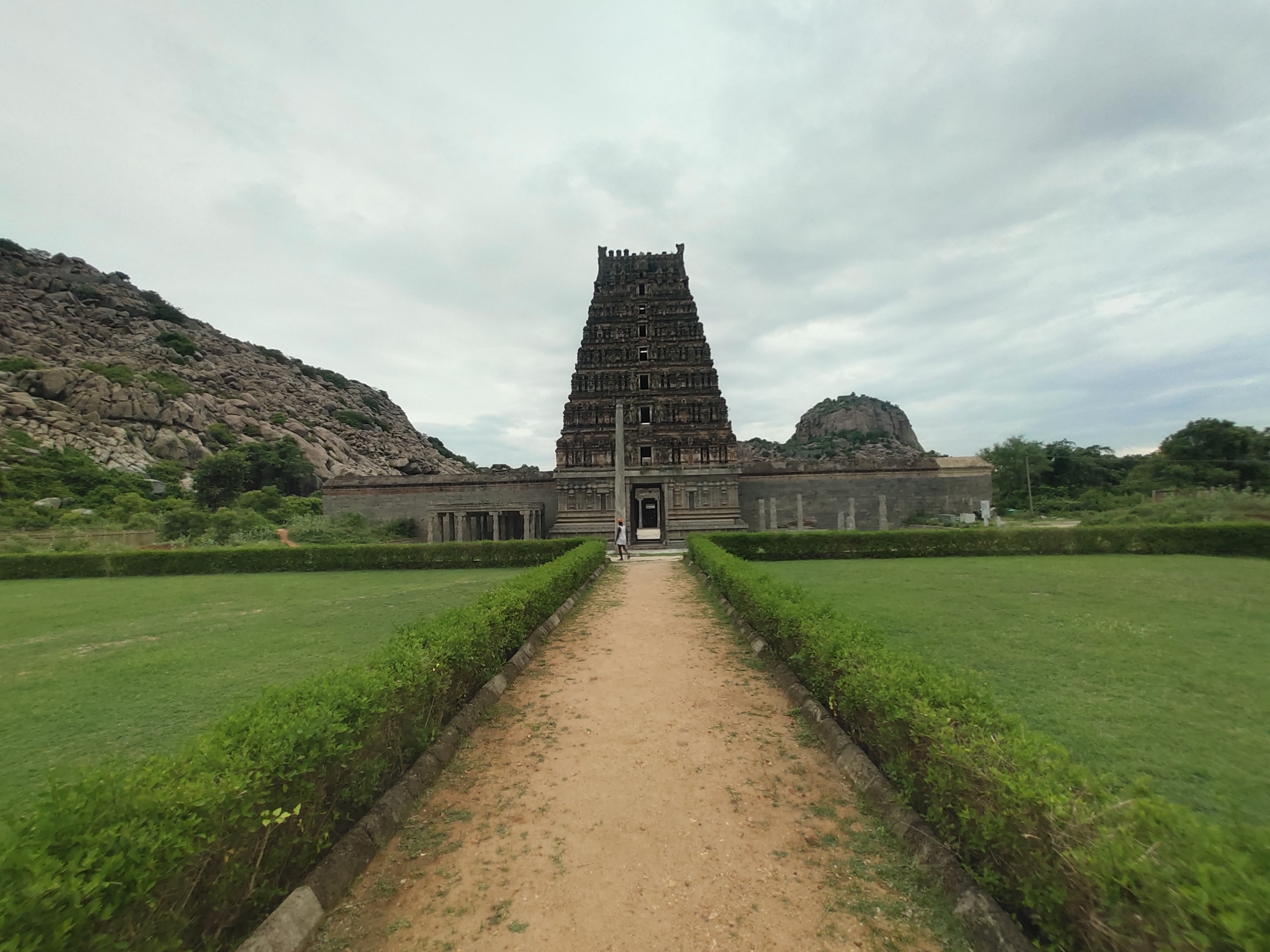
View of the gopuram

== See also ==
- Gingee Fort
- Chenjiamman
- Senji Singavaram Ranganatha Temple
