= Gingee Fort =

Fort in Tamil Nadu, India

- Part of Tamil Nadu
- Villupuram District, Tamil Nadu, India
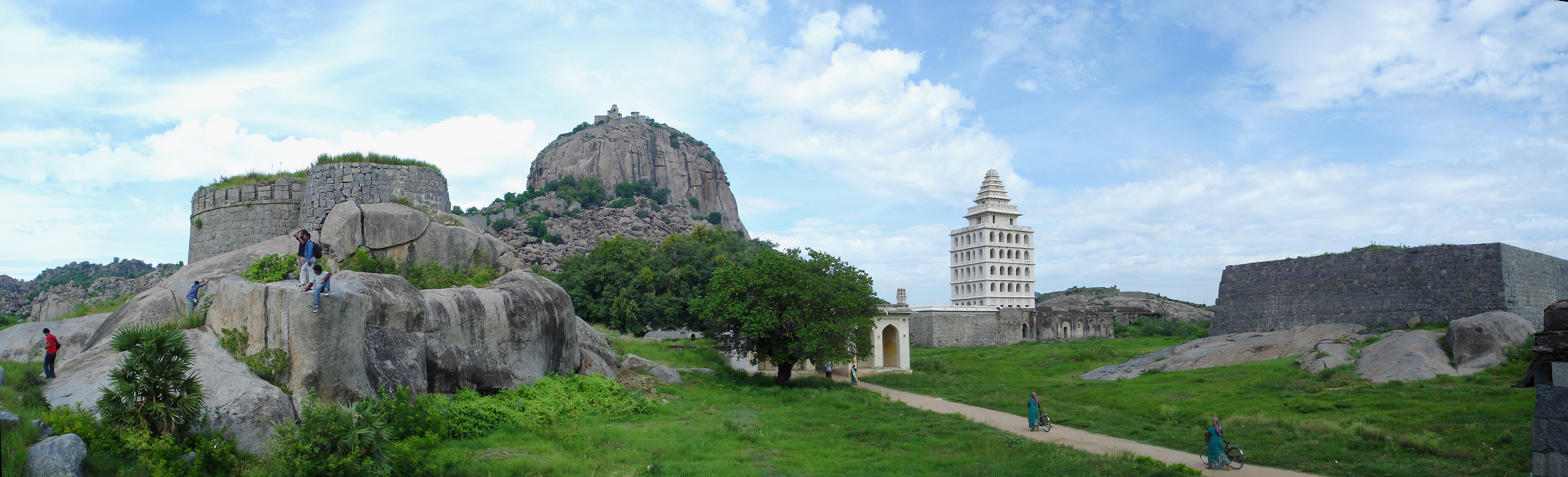
- A panorama of the Senji fort with the Kalyana Mahal visible just right of centre

Site information
- Type: Forts
- Owner: Government of India
- Controlled by: Chola Empire (9th century); Kon and Kadava dynasties (1130–13th century); Vijayanagara Empire (1345–1565); Gingee Nayaks (1509–1649); Bijapur Sultanate (1649–1677); Maratha Empire (1677–1698); Mughal Empire(1698–1750); French Empire (1750–1761); United Kingdom: East India Company (1761–1857); British Raj (1857–1947); India (1947–)
- Open to the public: Yes
- Condition: Ruins

Location
- Location within Tamil Nadu
- Coordinates: 12.2501°N 79.3948°E

Site history
- Built: 1st century
- Built by: The Gingee Fort was originally built by Ananda Kon around 1200 AD. area also ruled by Kadavan Saenjiyarkon of Kadava dynasty and later Chola dynasty, Vijayanagara Empire
- Materials: Granite Stones and lime mortar
- Events: National Monument (1921)

UNESCO World Heritage Site
- Part of: Maratha Military Landscapes of India
- Criteria: Cultural: iv, vi
- Reference: 1739-012
- Inscription: 2025 (47th Session)

Gingee Fort or Senji Fort (also known as Chenji, Chanchi, Jinji or Senchi) in Tamil Nadu, India is one of the surviving forts in Tamil Nadu, India. It is popularly known as Great Wall of South India. It lies in Villupuram District, 160 kilometres (99 mi) from the state capital, Chennai, and is close to the Union Territory of Puducherry. It is ranked as the "most impregnable fortress in India", and was called the "Troy of the East" by the British.

Originally mentioned as the territory of a Kadava chieftain titled Senjiyar Kon in Ottakoothar's Moovarula around 1123 AD. The fort was originally built by Ananda kon around 11th century AD. The fort was built as a strategic place of fending off any invading armies. As per one account, the fort was further fortified during the 15–16th century. The fort was won for Swarajya by Subedar Harji Rajemahadik for the Marathas under the leadership of Shivaji in 1677 AD. It was then conquered by the Bijapur sultans, the Moghuls, the Carnatic Nawabs, the French and finally the British in 1761. The fort is closely associated with Raja Tej Singh, who unsuccessfully revolted against the Nawab of Arcot and eventually lost his life in a battle.

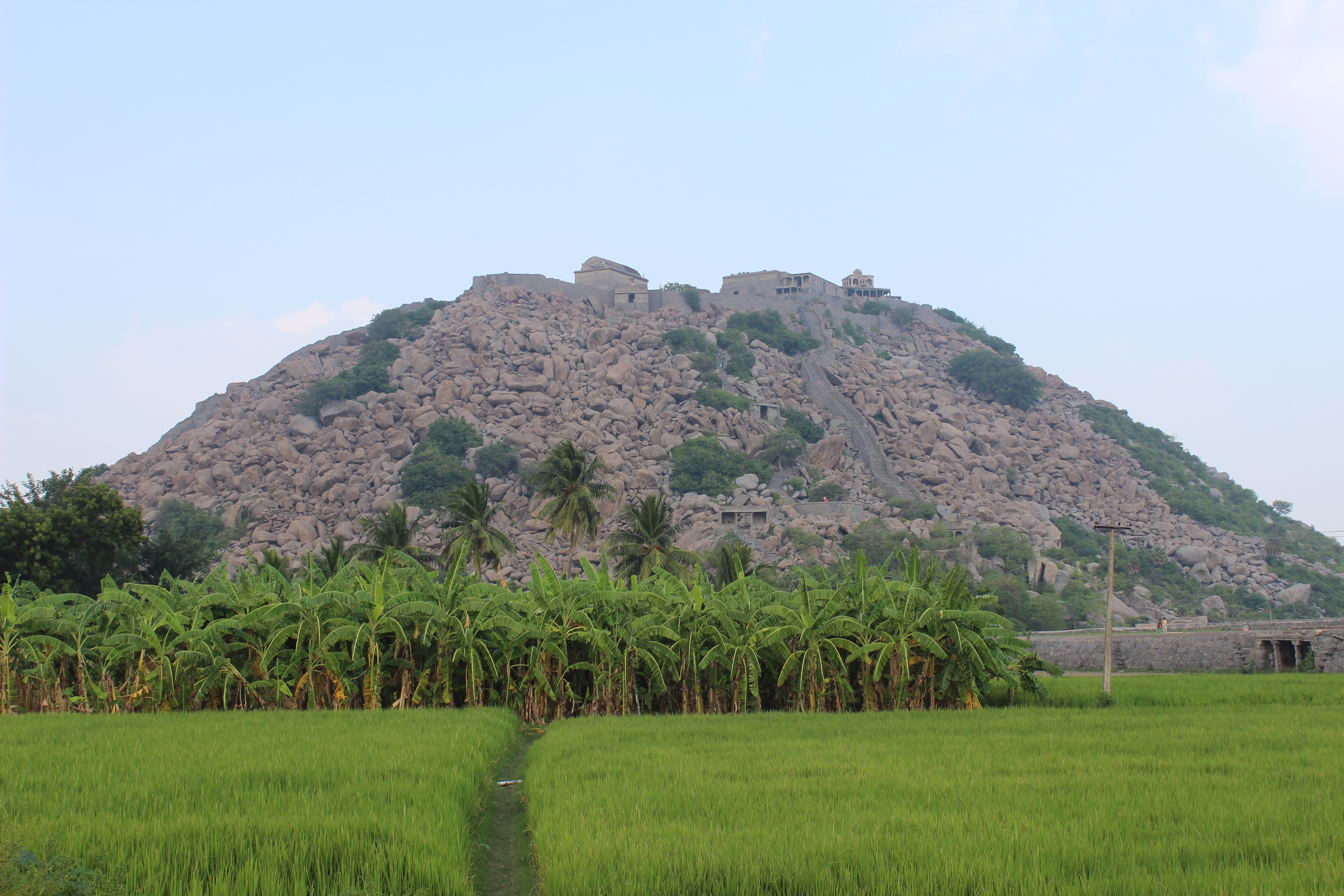
Gingee Fort Hill view from road

The Gingee Fort complex is on three hillocks: Krishnagiri to the north, Rajagiri or Anandagiri to the west and Chakilidurg to the southeast. The three hills together constitute a fort complex, each having a separate and self-contained citadel. The fort walls are 13 km (8.1 mi) and the three hills are connected by walls enclosing an area of 11 square kilometres (4.2 mi^{2}). It was built at a height of 800 feet (240 m) and protected by an 80 feet (24 m) wide moat. The complex has a seven-storeyed Kalyana Mahal(marriage hall)which has a pyramidical shikhara or summit on top, granaries, prison cells, and a temple dedicated to its presiding goddess called Chenjiamman. The fortifications contain a sacred pond known as Aanaikulam. On the top of the hillock, there are minor fortifications. The fort, in modern times, is maintained and administered by the Archaeological Survey of India. The fort is one of the prominent tourist destinations in Villupuram district.

== Legend and etymology ==
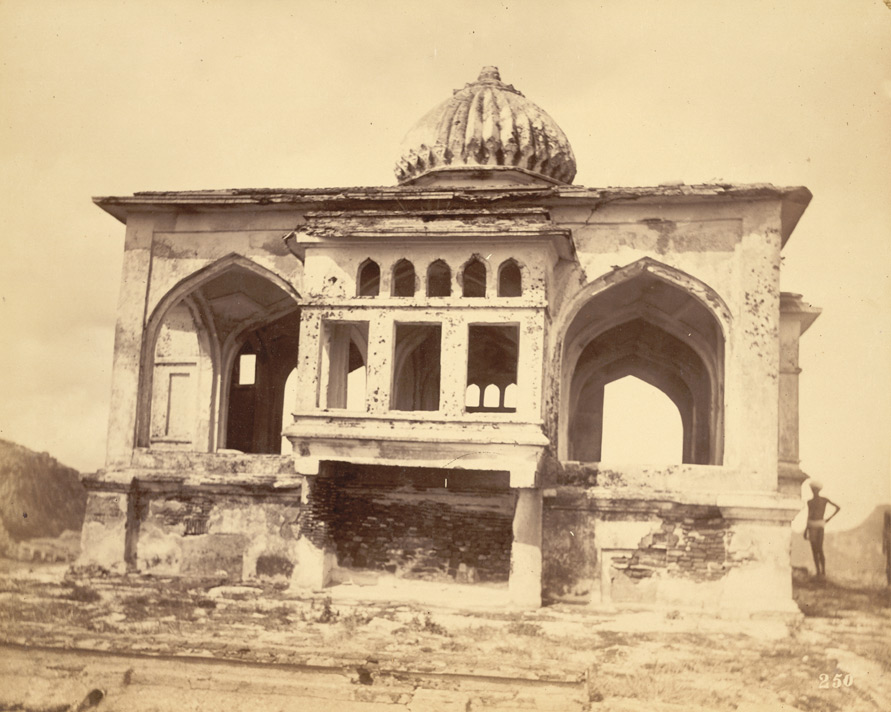
Throne on the Krishnagiri

The Bijapur Nawabs who held the fort from about 1660 to 1677 AD called it Badshabad, while the Marathas who succeeded them called it Chandry or Chindy. The Mughals, on their capture of the fort in 1698 A.D., named it Nusratgadh in honour of Nawab Zulfiqar Khan Nusrat Jung, the commander-in-chief of the besieging army. Later, the English and the French called it Gingee or Jinji. The early Madras records of the English give the spelling Chingee or Chengey.

As per Tamil legend, the tragic tale of Raja Tej Singh, popularly known in Tamil as Thesingu Raasan, is associated with the fort. The true life story of Tej Singh and his general, Mehboob Khan (aka Maavuthukaran), who were friends, has inspired many poems, street plays, and countless other stories. He was the son of Swarup Singh and revolted against the Nawab of Arcot, and was defeated and killed in the war that followed. Though Gingee became a part of the Nawab's territory in 1714, the young and courageous Tej Singh became a legend and his life, love and brave but tragic end were eulogised in various ballads.

== History ==
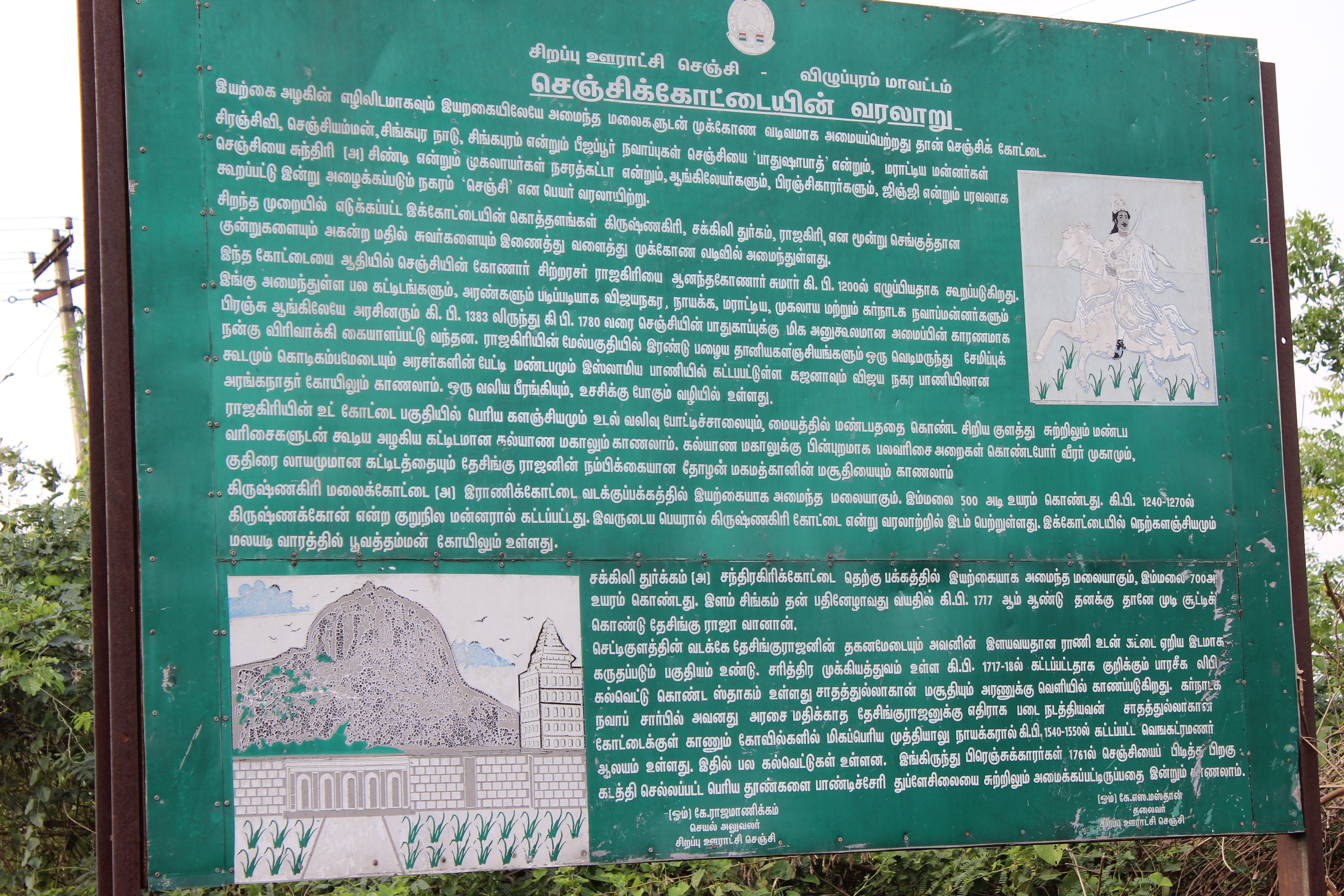
Gingee Fort History Board

=== Early history ===
The main source for the first two hundred years of the history of the place is the "Complete History of the Carnatic Kings" among the Mackenzie manuscripts(an archive built by Colin Mackenzie, a high-ranking official of the British East India Company in Madras). According to historian Narayan, a small village called Melacerri, located 3 mi (4.8 km) away from Gingee is called "Old Gingee" has traces of fortifications from about 1200 AD. The earliest mention of the hill fort of Gingee is found in an Inscription of Vikrama Chola (1120–63) dated in his 10th Year and a feudatory of the Kadava, calls himself the Lord of Senjiyar of the strong embattled fort. Gingee came into the hands of various ruling dynasties of South India, starting from the Cholas.

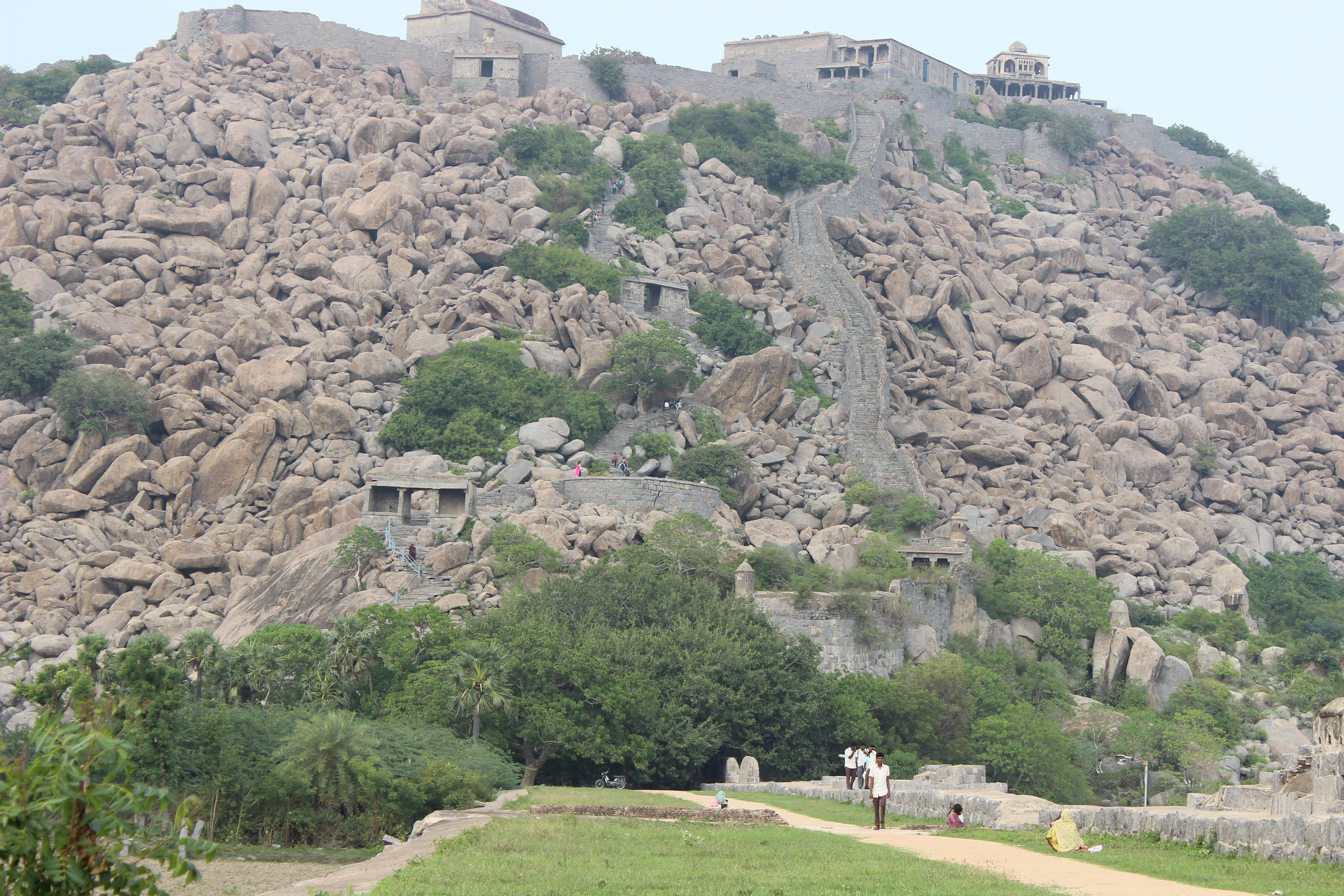
Throne in Gingee Fort Hill

Originally the site of a small fort built by the Chola dynasty during the 9th century AD, Gingee Fort was modified and developed by Kadava kings (12th century) and again by the Vijayanagar empire during the 14th century.

=== Gingee Nayaks ===
In the early 16th century, the Vijayanagara Emperors appointed Gingee Nayaks (Governors) to rule Gingee.As per one account, the fort was built by them in the 15–16th century. After the defeat of the Vijayanagara Empire in the Battle of Talikota, they became independent kings.

=== Bijapur Sultanate ===
Their rule lasted till the 1640s, then the Adil Shahi Sultanate of Bijapur and the Qutb Shahi Sultanate of Golconda launched a coordinated invasion of the Carnatic and captured the fort in 1649. It remained under Bijapur governors for nearly 30 years.

=== Maratha rule ===
In July 1677, Shivaji captured Gingee during his 'Dakshin Digvijay'. Shivaji famously called it the "most impregnable fortress in India" and ordered its mud walls replaced with granite.

During Aurangzeb's campaign in the Deccan, after Shivaji's successor Sambhaji was killed by the Mughals, his second son who had assumed the throne, Rajaram I, escaped to Jinji (Gingee) and continued the fight with Moghuls from Ginjee. The fort was the seat of the Maratha Empire for a few months.

In 1691, it was besieged by Moghul generals Zul Fikar Khan, Asad Khan and Kam Baksha but was successfully defended by Santaji Ghorpade. The Moghuls captured the fort after laying siege for seven years in 1698, but not before Rajaram escaped.

=== Mughals ===
In 1700, Aurangzeb assigned the fort as an "Imperial Reward" to Raja Swarup Singh Bundela, a trusted Rajput commander, as a Mansabdar (feudatory chief), because Swarup Singh had provided significant military service, allowing him to rule with a high degree of autonomy. When Swarup Singh died in 1714, a conflict arose between his son, Tej Singh (Raja Desingh), and the Nawab of Arcot, Saadatullah Khan I. In the ensuing battle, Tej Singh was killed and the fort was captured by Saadatullah, effectively bringing in under the rule of Carnatic Nawabs.

=== Colonial rule ===
During the Second Carnatic War, the French saw Gingee as a strategic key to dominating Southern India, and a small group led by Marquis de Bussy-Castelnau captured it in 1750. The French held it for 11 years, but lost it to the British in 1761, after fall of French power in India.

Hyder Ali captured it for a brief period, after which the British eventually regained the fort after the defeat of Mysore, maintaining it as a military station until the 19th century.

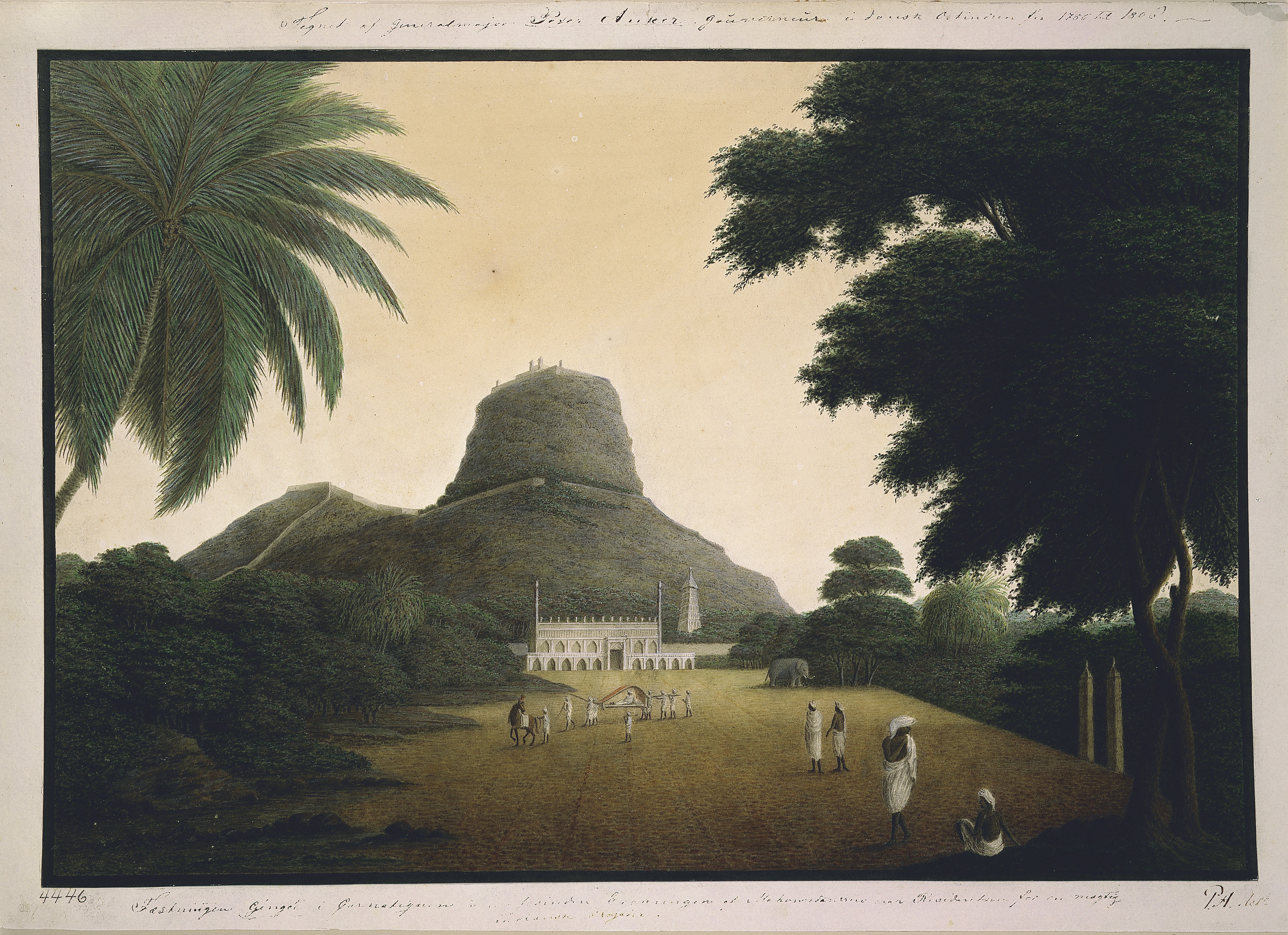
Fort Gingee, Karnatik - Peter Anker (1744–1832)

== Architecture ==
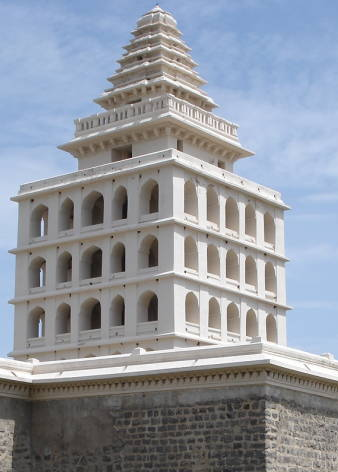
Kalyana Mahal at Gingee fort

The Gingee Fort complex is on three hillocks: Krishnagiri to the north, Rajagiri to the west and Chandrayandurg to the southeast. The three hills together constitute a fort complex, yet each hill contains a separate and self-contained citadel. Connecting them – forming an enormous triangle, a mile from north to south, punctuated by bastions and gateways giving access to the protected zones at the heart of the complex. The fort walls are 13 km (8.1 mi) and the three hills are connected by walls enclosing an area of 11 square kilometres (4.2 mi^{2}). It was built at a height of 800 feet (240 m) and protected by an 80 feet (24 m) wide moat. It has a seven-storeyed Kalyana Mahal (marriage hall), granaries, prison cells, and a temple dedicated to its presiding Hindu goddess called Chenjiamman. The fortifications contain a sacred pond known as Aanaikulam. The walls of the fort are a mixture of the natural hilly terrain comprising the Krishnagiri, Chakkilidrug and Rajagiri hills, while the gaps were sealed with the main wall that measures 20 metres (66 ft) in thickness. On the top of the hillock, there are minor fortifications.

Water resources are usually sparse in South Indian forts, while it was well managed in the Citadel. There are two sweet water sources on the summit and below it there are three reservoirs for storage of rain water. Water for Kalyana Mahal was brought through earthenware pipes from reservoir located 500 m (1,600 ft) from it.

=== Rajagiri ===
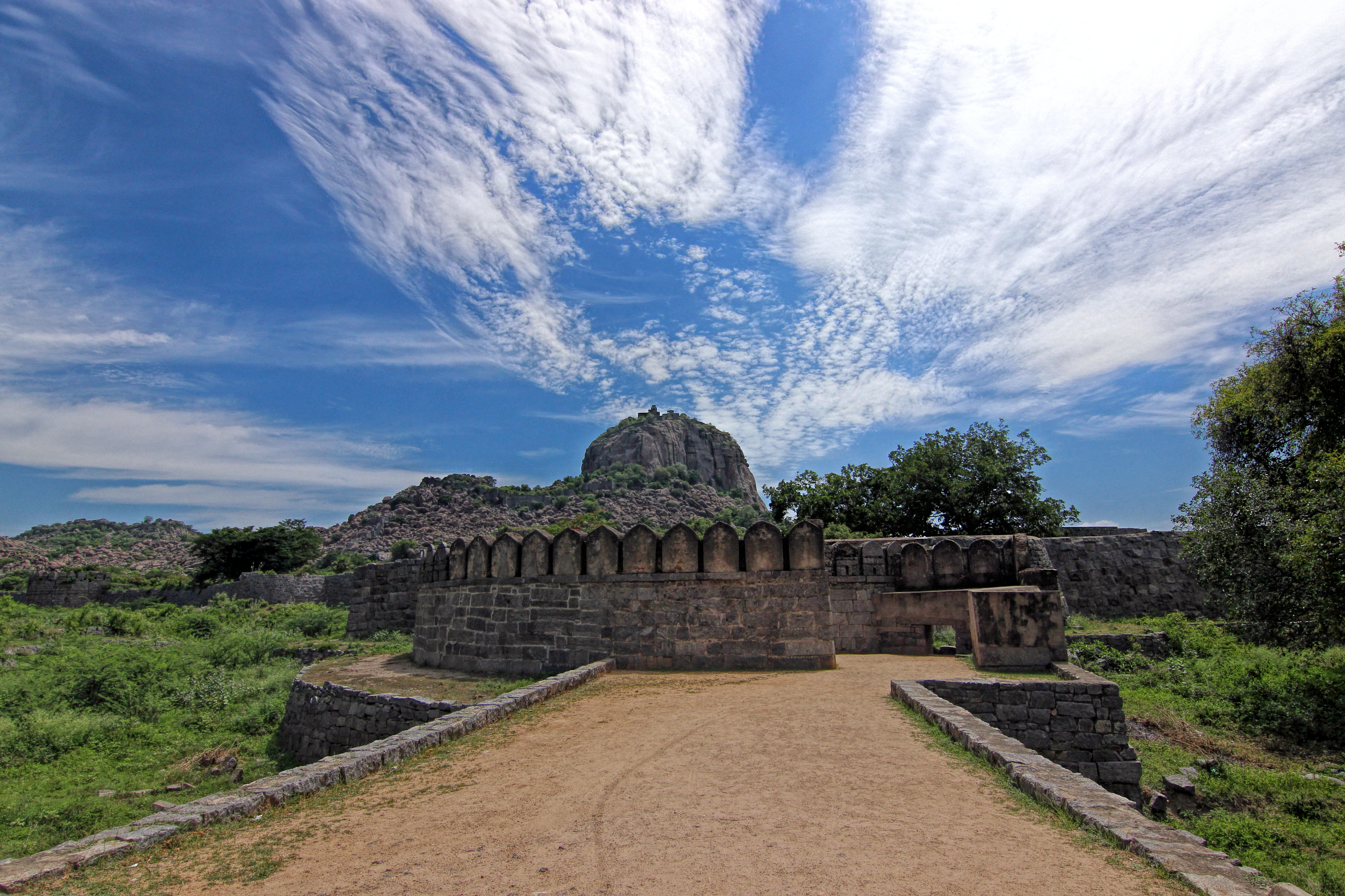
Gingee fort as seen from the entrance

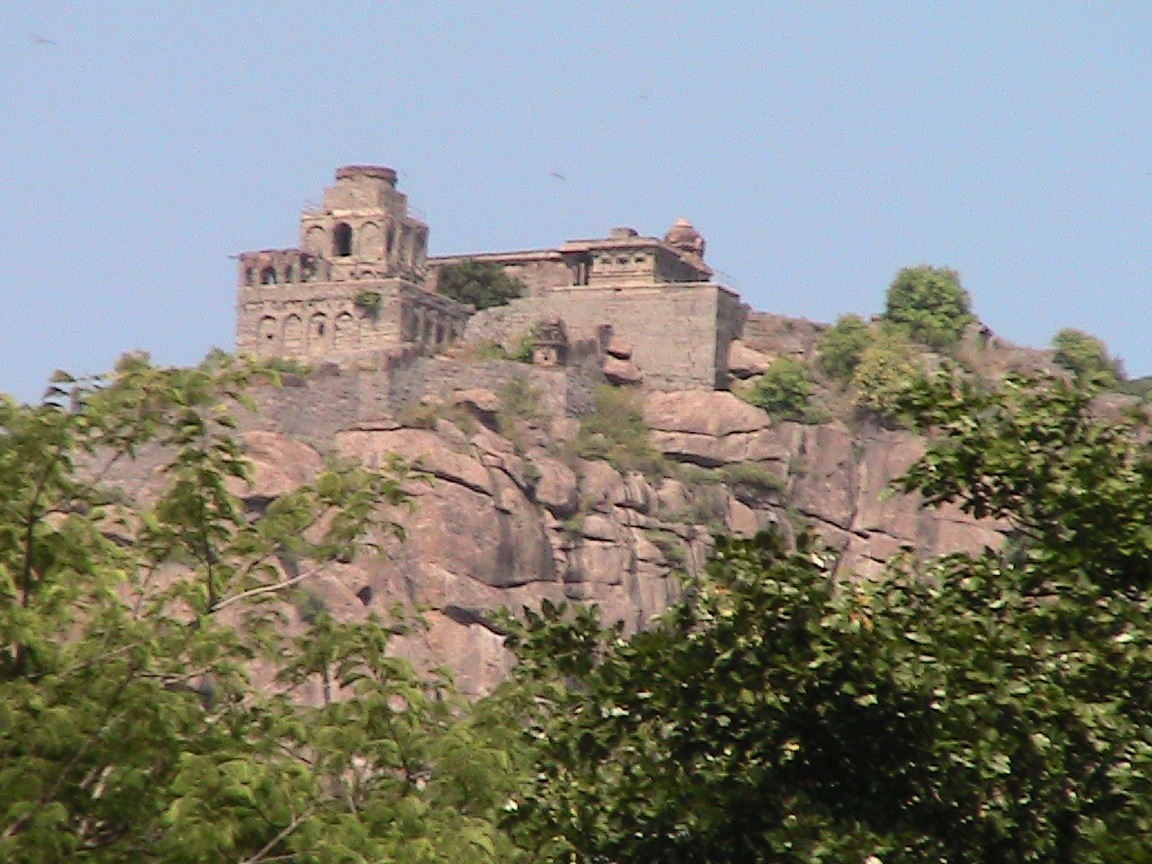
Rajagiri Fort

The first hill, where the main fort is, is called Rajagiri. Originally it was known as Kamalagiri as well as Anandagiri. The fort was historically considered the most impregnable. It is about 800 feet (240 m) in height. Its summit is cut off from communication and is surrounded by a deep, natural chasm that is about 10 yards (9.1 m) wide and 20 yards (18 m) deep. To gain entry into the citadel one had to cross the chasm with the help of a small wooden draw bridge. The naturally strong rock where the fortress is located is further strengthened by constructing embrasure walls and gateways along all possible shelves and steep edges. The citadel is reached by traversing through seven gates. This citadel contains important buildings apart from the living quarters of the royalty, like the stables, granaries, and meeting halls for the public, temples, mosques, shrines and pavilions. Kamalakanni Amman temple is present atop the Rajagiri hills. As per Hindu legend, the presiding deity, Kamalakanni, is believed to be the widow of demon king Acalamaccuran. Draupadi, a Hindu goddess, beheaded a hundred heads of the demon and Kamalakanni is believed to have protested that she would become a widow. Draupadi explains her similarities in that she has no sexual relations, though married. This resulted in the ambiguous kanni suffix. Ranganathar Temple, bell tower, watch tower, cannon and draw bridge are located atop the hill.

The lower fort consists of Arcot Gate, Pondicherry Gate, which the French probably improved during their occupation (1751–1761), the Prison on top of Pondicherry Gate, Royal Battery, Venkataramanaswami Temple, Pattabhi Ramaswami Temple, Sadatulla Khan's mosque, Chettikulam and Chakrakulam tanks, platform where Raja Desingh was killed in a war, large stone image of Hanuman, prisoner's well, where the prisoners condemned to death were thrown and left to die of starvation. The inner fort consists of the Kalyana Mahal, the royal stables, the ruined royal palace, the Anaikulam tank, granaries, a magazine and the shrine of Venugopalaswami. There is a site museum at the entrance of the fort set up by the Archaeological Survey of India (ASI) containing sculptures about periods and many dynasties that ruled Gingee. There are also guns and cannonballs made of stone, strewn about the fort.

It was built in 1200 AD and is located in Rajagiri, which means Kings Hill. It is 1 km from Gingee Market. It is made up of saffron and black rock. Currently, the fort includes a magazine, gymnasium, palace site, audience hall, stable, clock tower, granary, treasury in Indo-Islamic style, store-house for grains and an elephant tank. In the West Entrance, Venu Gopalaswami Temple, Ranganath Temple of Vijayanagar Kings, Kalyan Mandap, Sadatulla Khan's Masjid (1717–18), Mahabbat Khan's masjid. Bath tubs with continuous supply of water, a huge cannon, belong to the temple on the top of the fort near Chakrakulam-Kunda (reservoir).

=== Krishnagiri ===
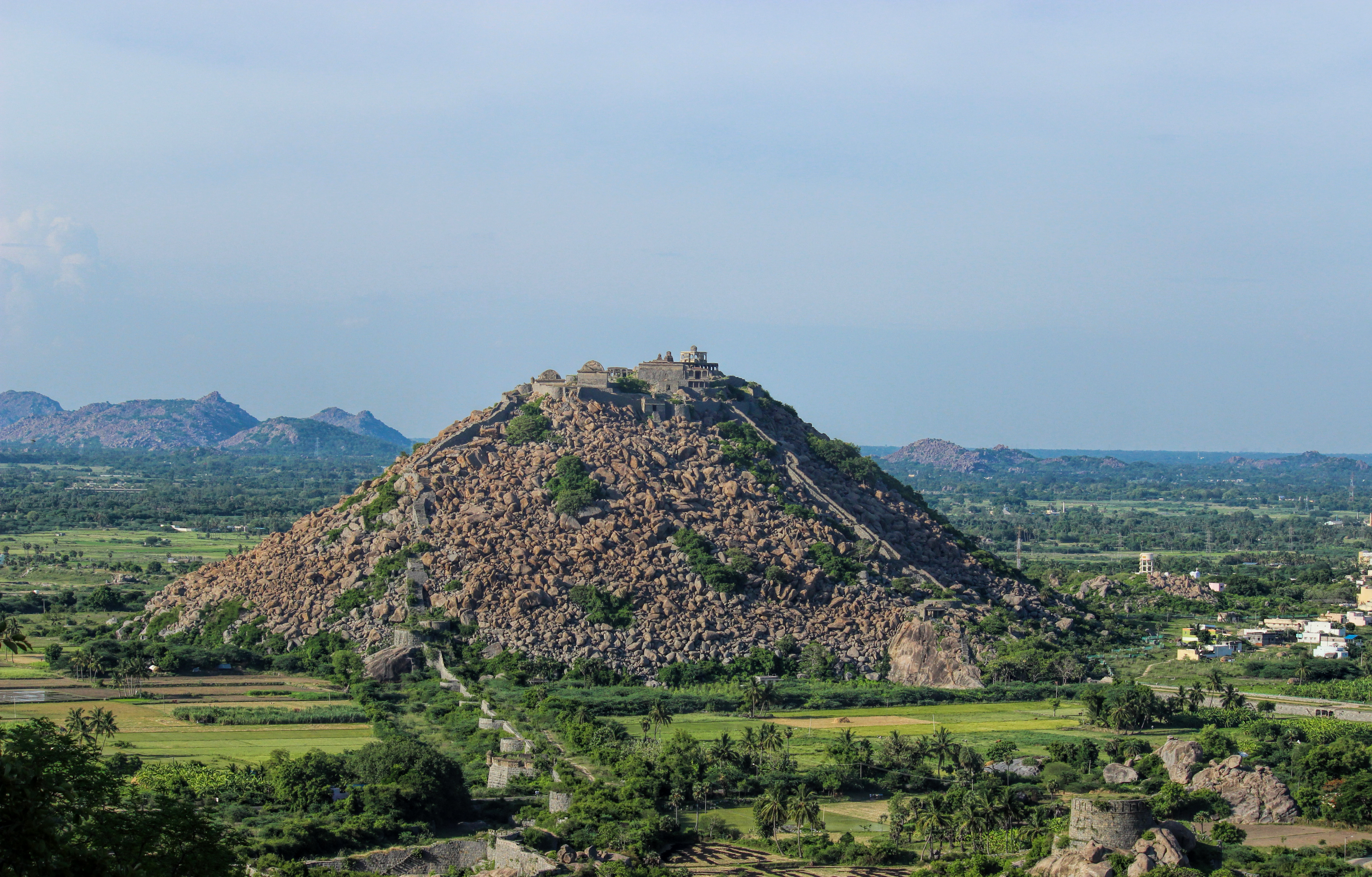
Queen fort as seen from Rajagiri

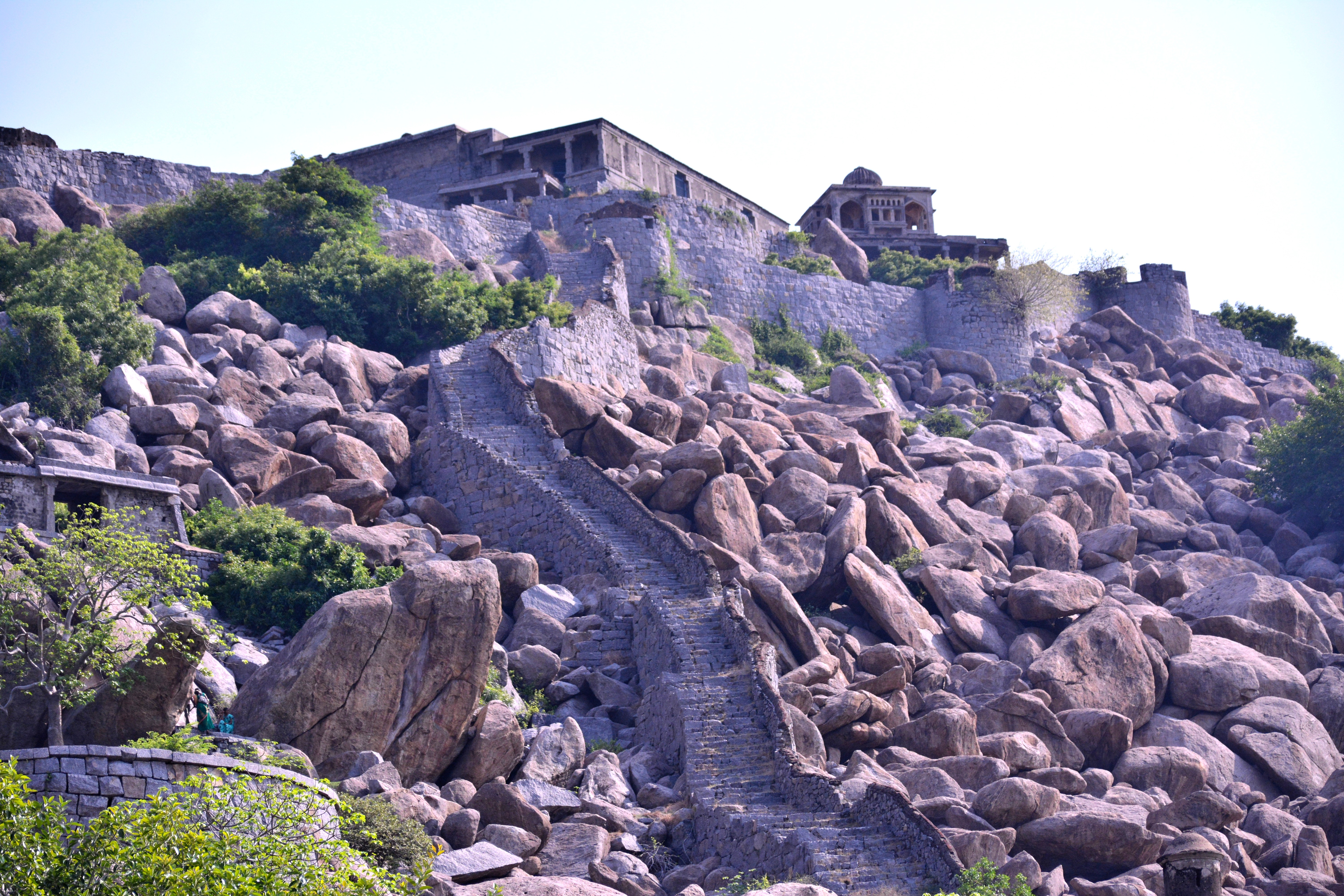
Krishnagiri Fort

The second important hill with an impressive citadel is called Krishnagiri fort, also known as the English Mountain, perhaps because of the British residents who occupied the fort here for some time. While the greater complex is potentially significantly older, the Krishnagiri Fort was built sometime in the 13th century at the request of Kristhna Kón. It is situated in the Krishnagiri district. The Krishnagiri fort is situated to the north of Tiruvannamalai road and is smaller in size and height compared to the Rajagiri fort. A flight of granite stone steps leads to the top of the hill. Another fort, connected with Rajagiri by a low rocky ridge, is called Chandrayan Durg, Chandragiri or St. George's Mountain. Although the military and strategic value of this fort has been relatively less, it has some interesting buildings from a later period.

By the 1900s, the fort fell into disuse, although it was partially repaired after being damaged by a 1913 cyclone. Once India gained independence in 1947, Krishnagiri Fort came under the jurisdiction of the Indian government. It is preserved by the Archaeological Survey of India.

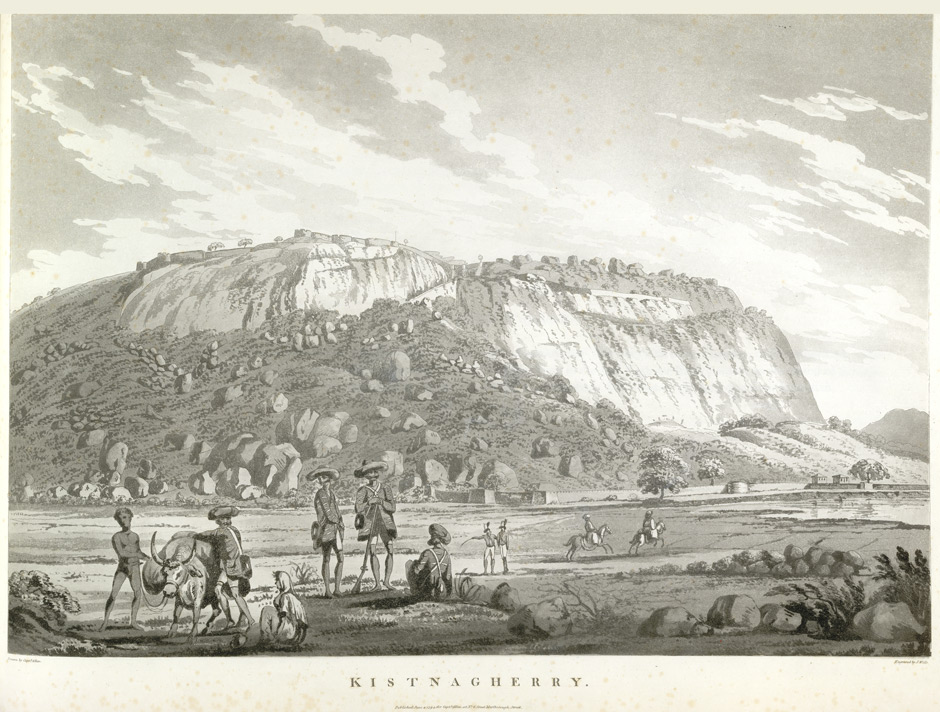
"Kistnagherry" fort painting by Sir Alexander allan

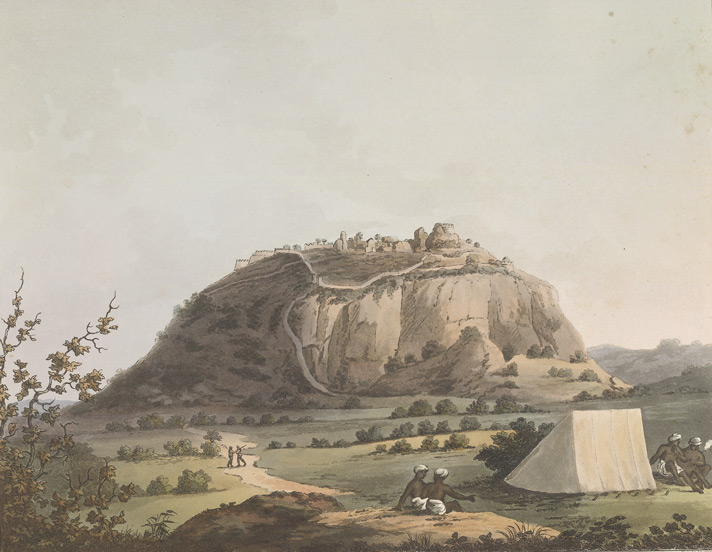
"Kistnaghurry" fort painting by James Hunter

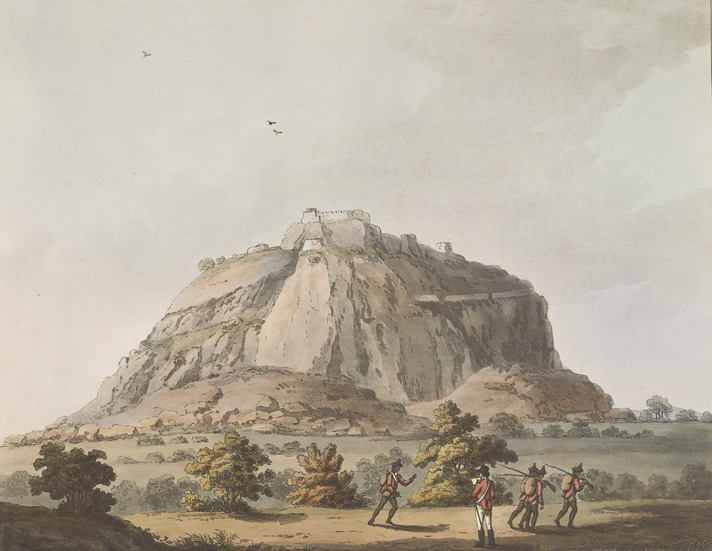
"East View Of Kistnaghurry" fort painting by James Hunter

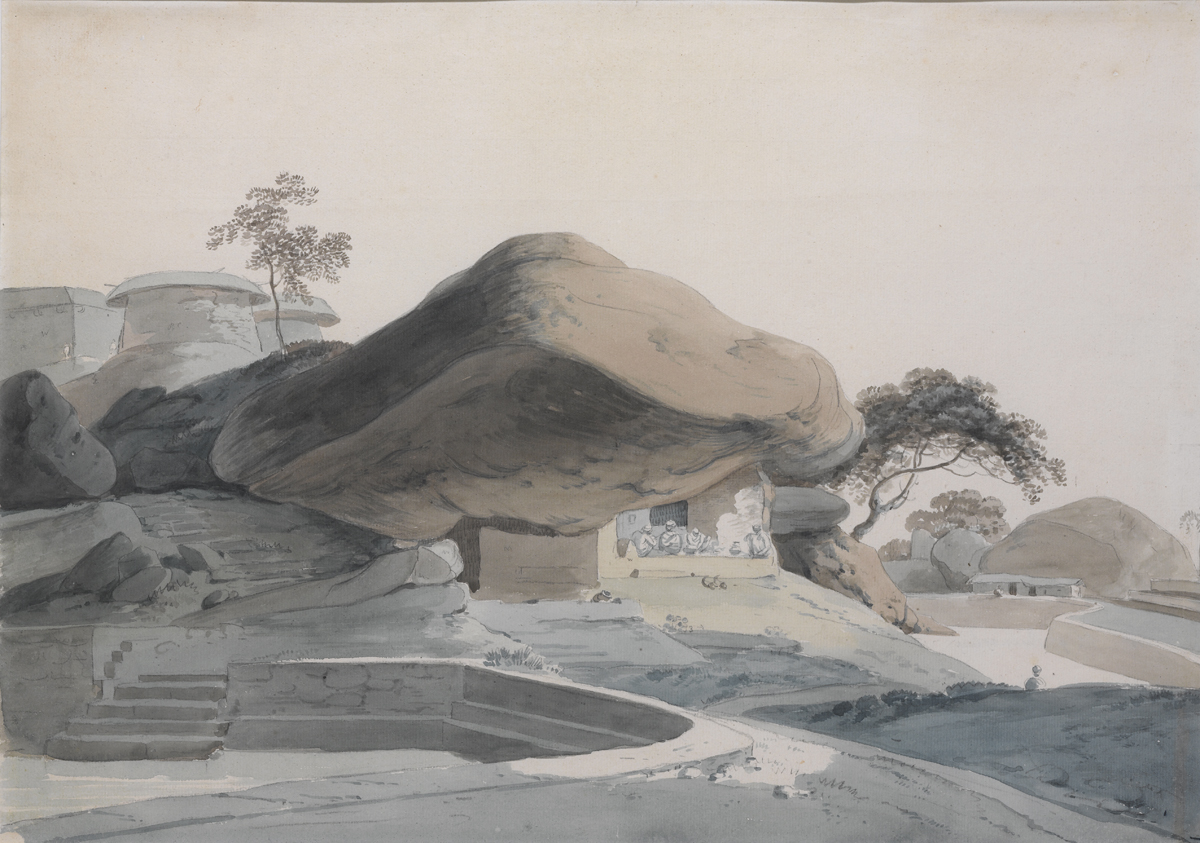
Fort of Krishnaghirry

=== Chakkiliya Durg ===
The third fort for some reason is called Chakkiliya Durg or Chamar Tikri – meaning the fort of the Chamars. It is not known why it had acquired the name. Probably the royal Chamar warriors used to stay here, as Gingee obviously was a military encampment. There is a smaller and less important fourth hill, the summit of which is also well fortified. There is nothing much left of Chandrayan Durg and Chakkilli Durg. Their flanks are now completely covered with thorny shrubs and stone pieces.

== Culture ==
After the fort passed into British hands, it did not see any further action. The fort at Gingee was declared a National Monument in 1921 and was under the Archaeological Department. The Tourism Department of India has tried to popularize this remote and oft-forgotten fort. Gingee today, with its ruined forts, temples and granaries, presents a different picture from the glorious splendor of its bygone days. But the remains of that glorious past speak volumes about the numerous invasions, warfare and bravery that it witnessed. The fort is maintained by the ASI. An entry charge of ₹20 is charged for Indian citizens and ₹250 for foreigners for all monuments inside Krishnagiri and Rajagiri forts. Tickets are sold outside of the fort

== Gallery ==
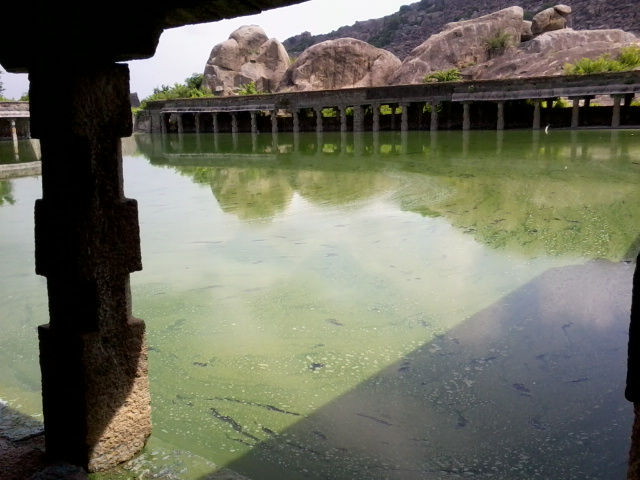
Tomb pillar at lower fort

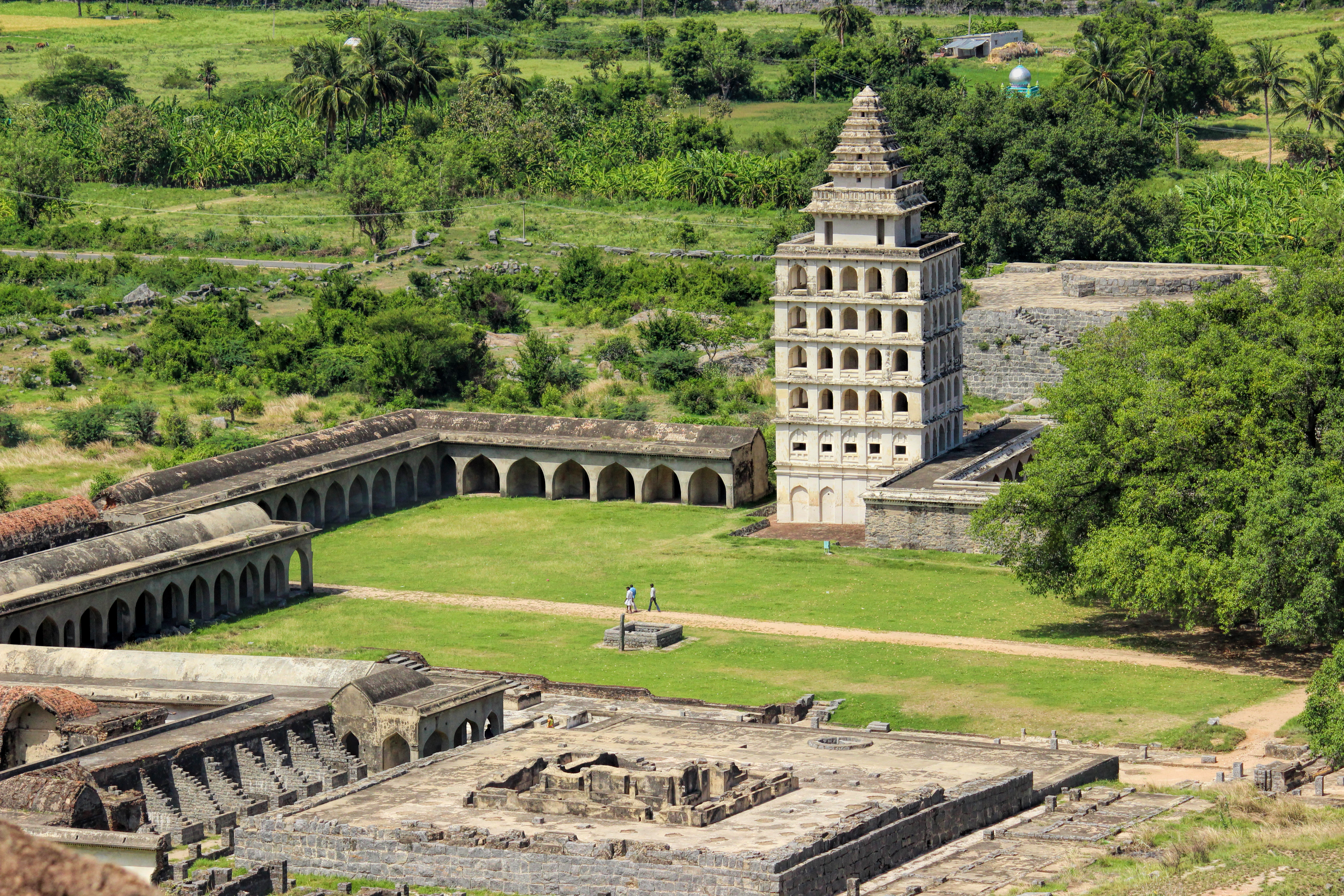
Kalyana Mahal as seen from Rajagiri

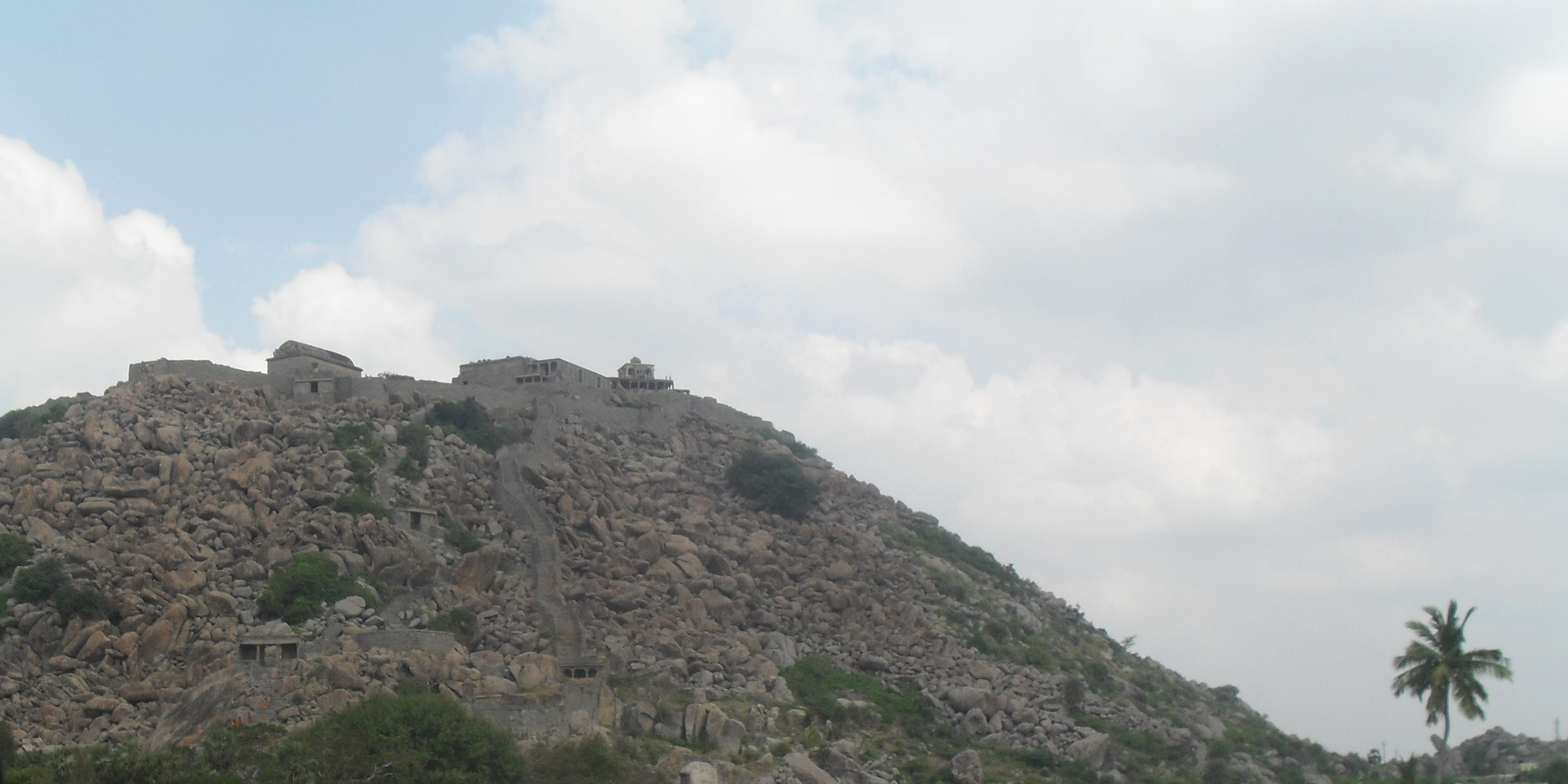
View of Gingee Fort(Queens) from the ground

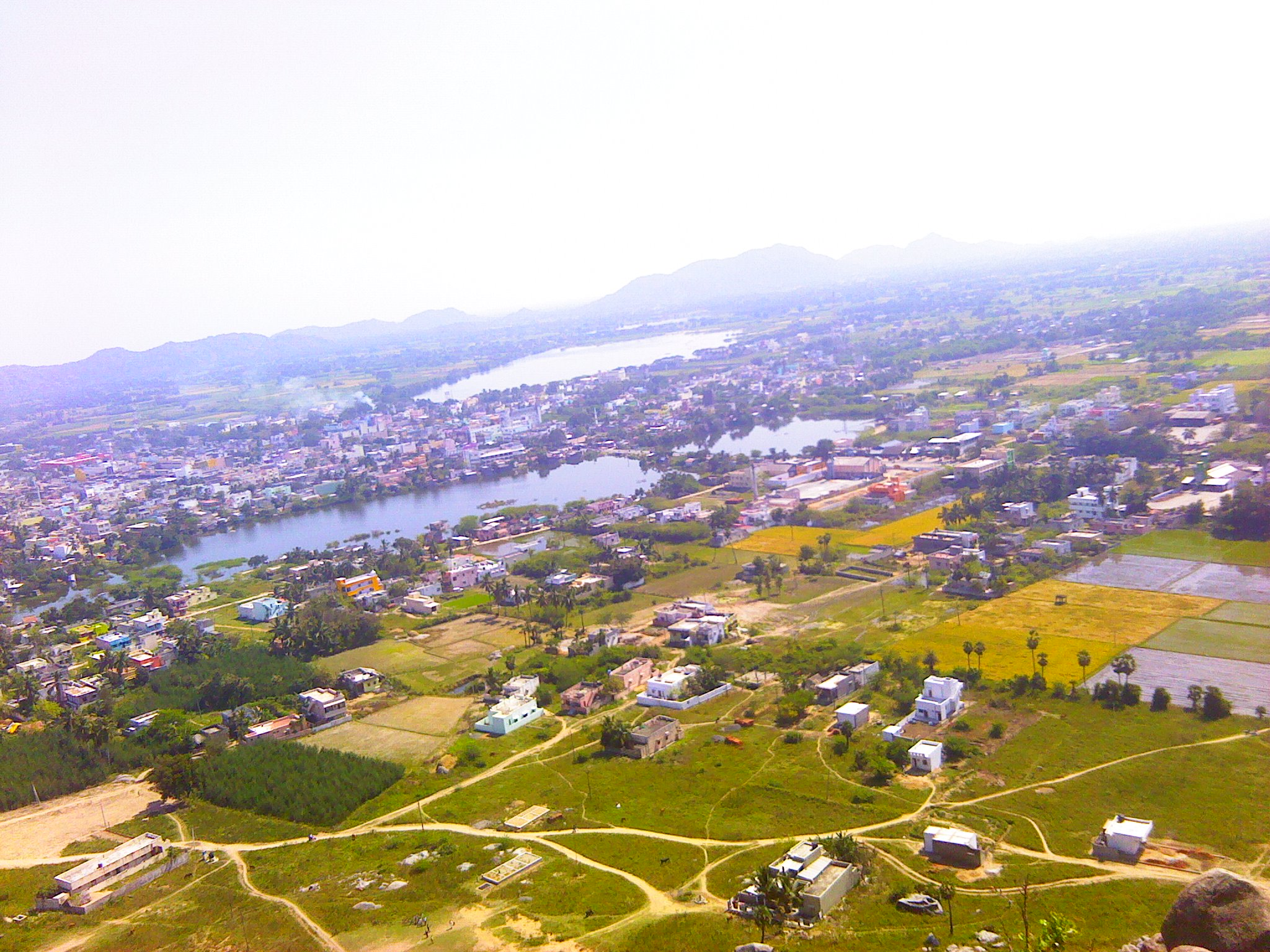
View from Queen's Fort Top – Gingee Town

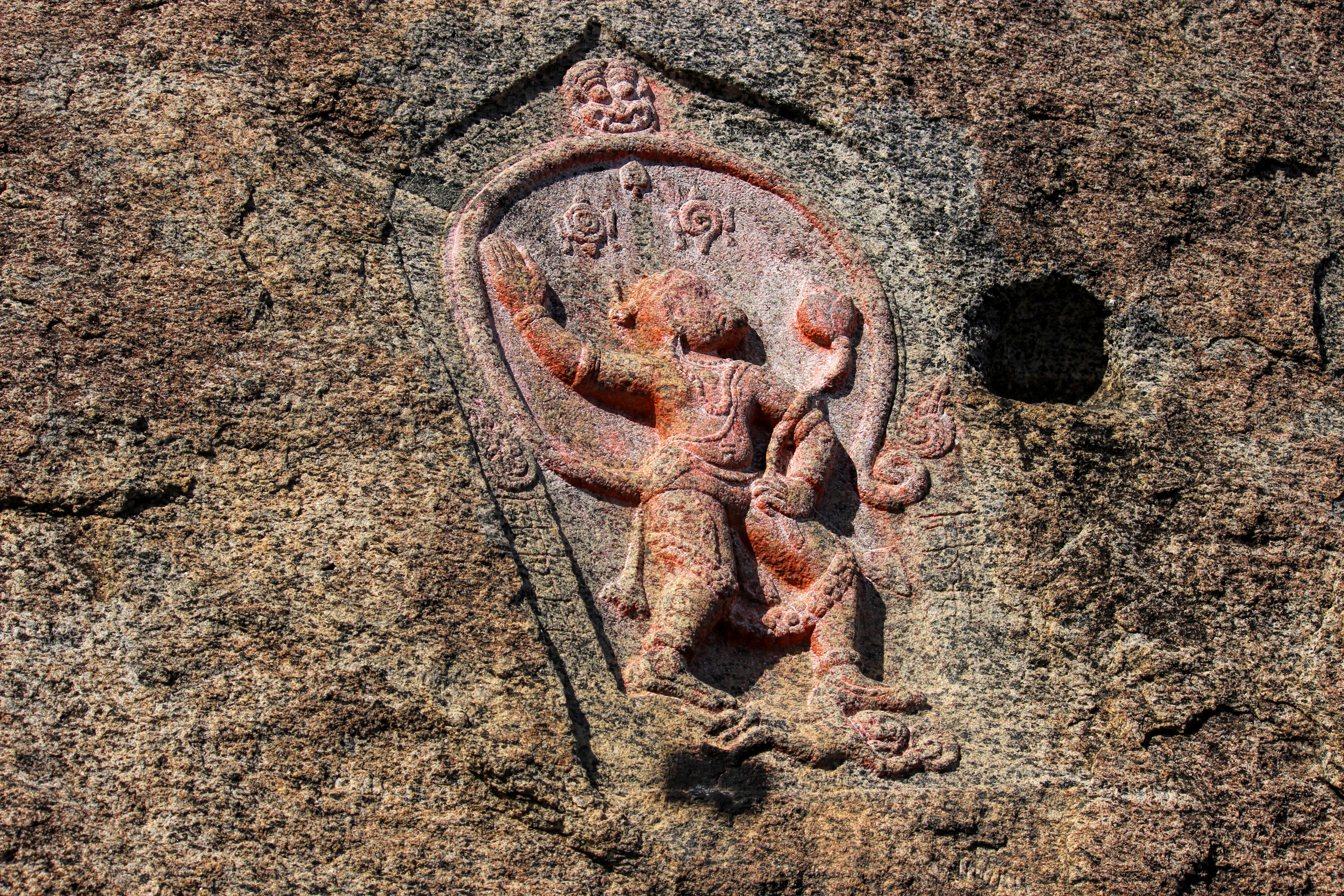
Large stone image of Hanuman

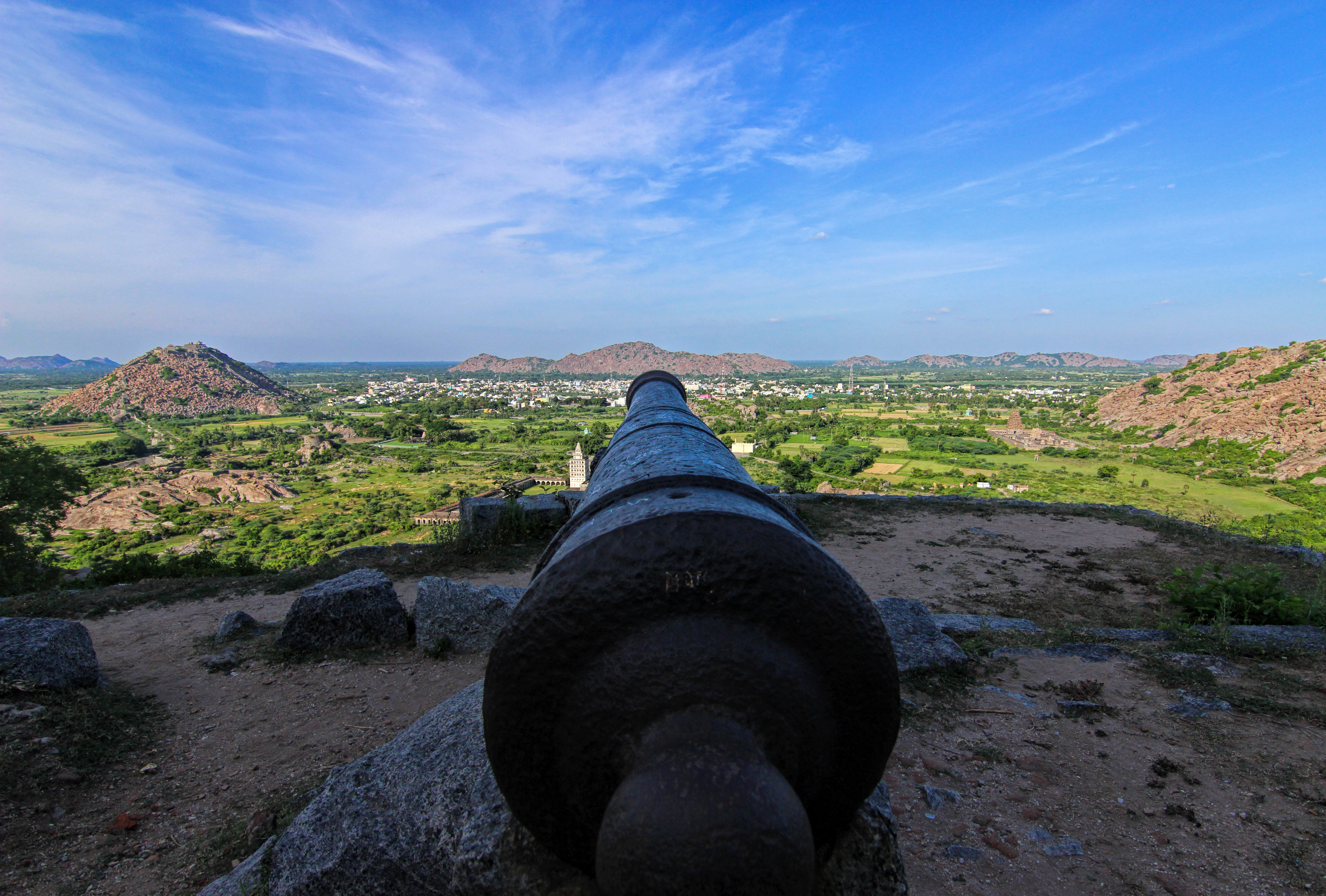
Cannon present in Gingee Fort

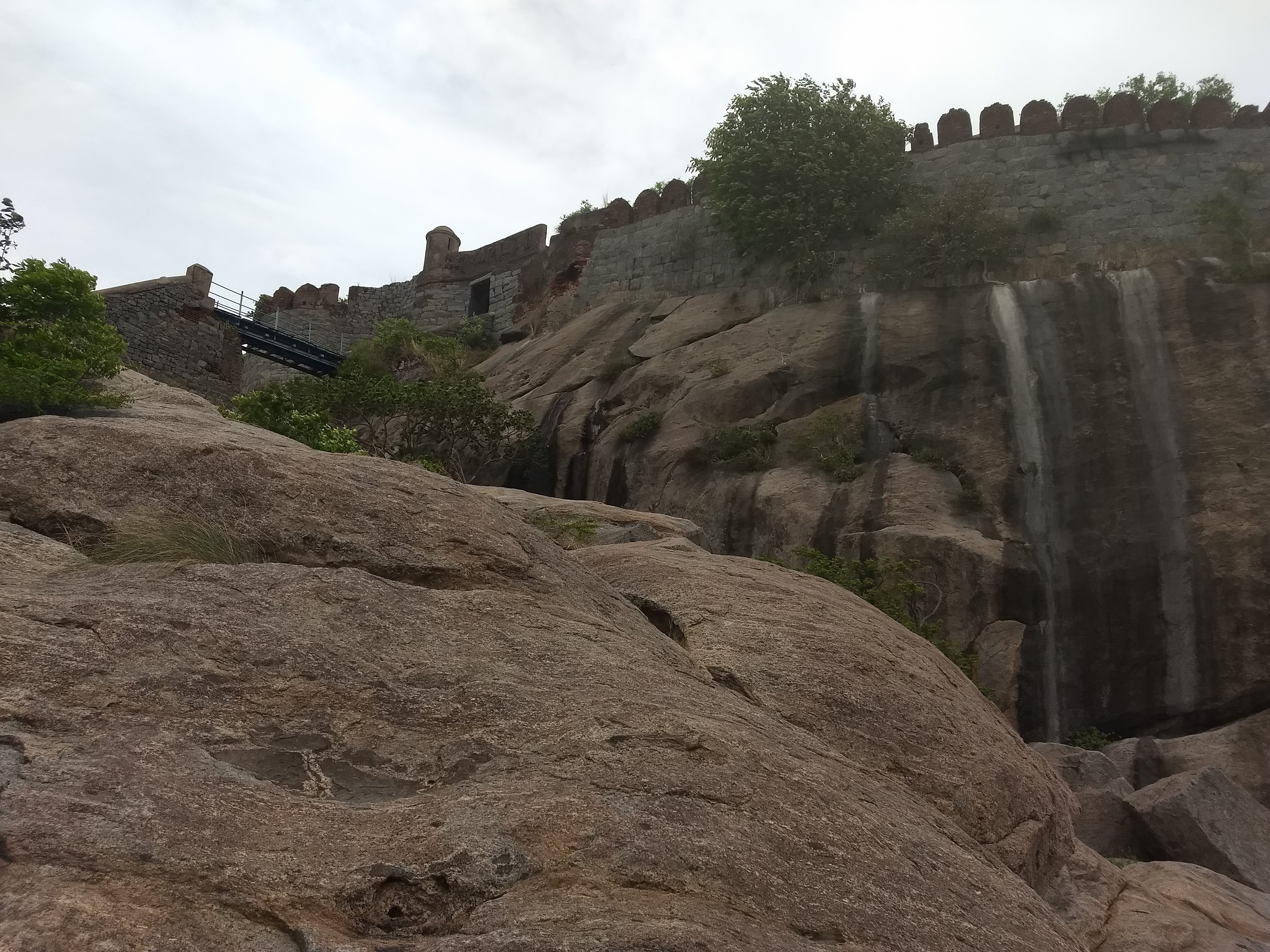
View of Wooden bridge at chasm Rajagiri fort

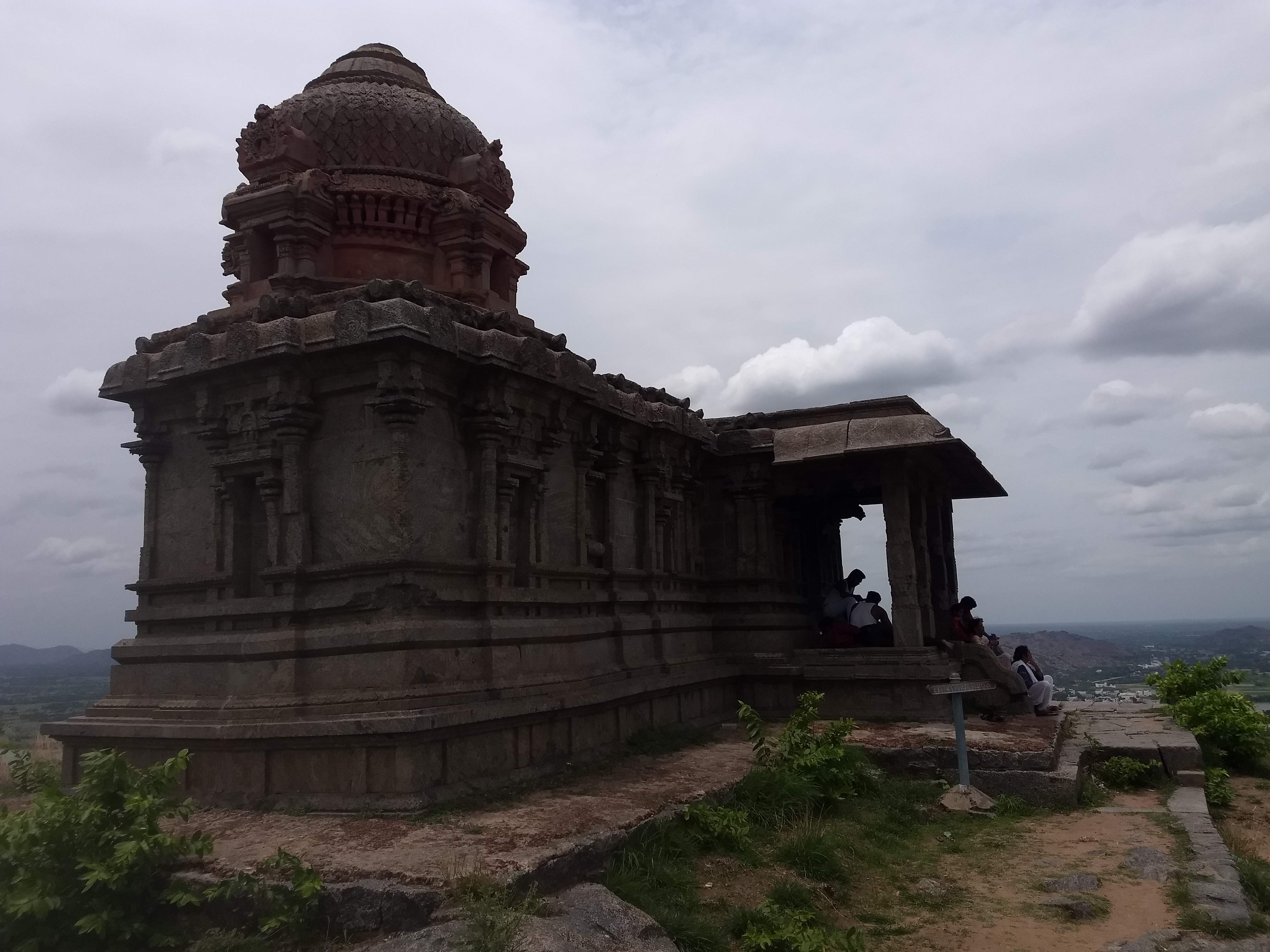
Ranganatha temple at Rajagiri Fort summit

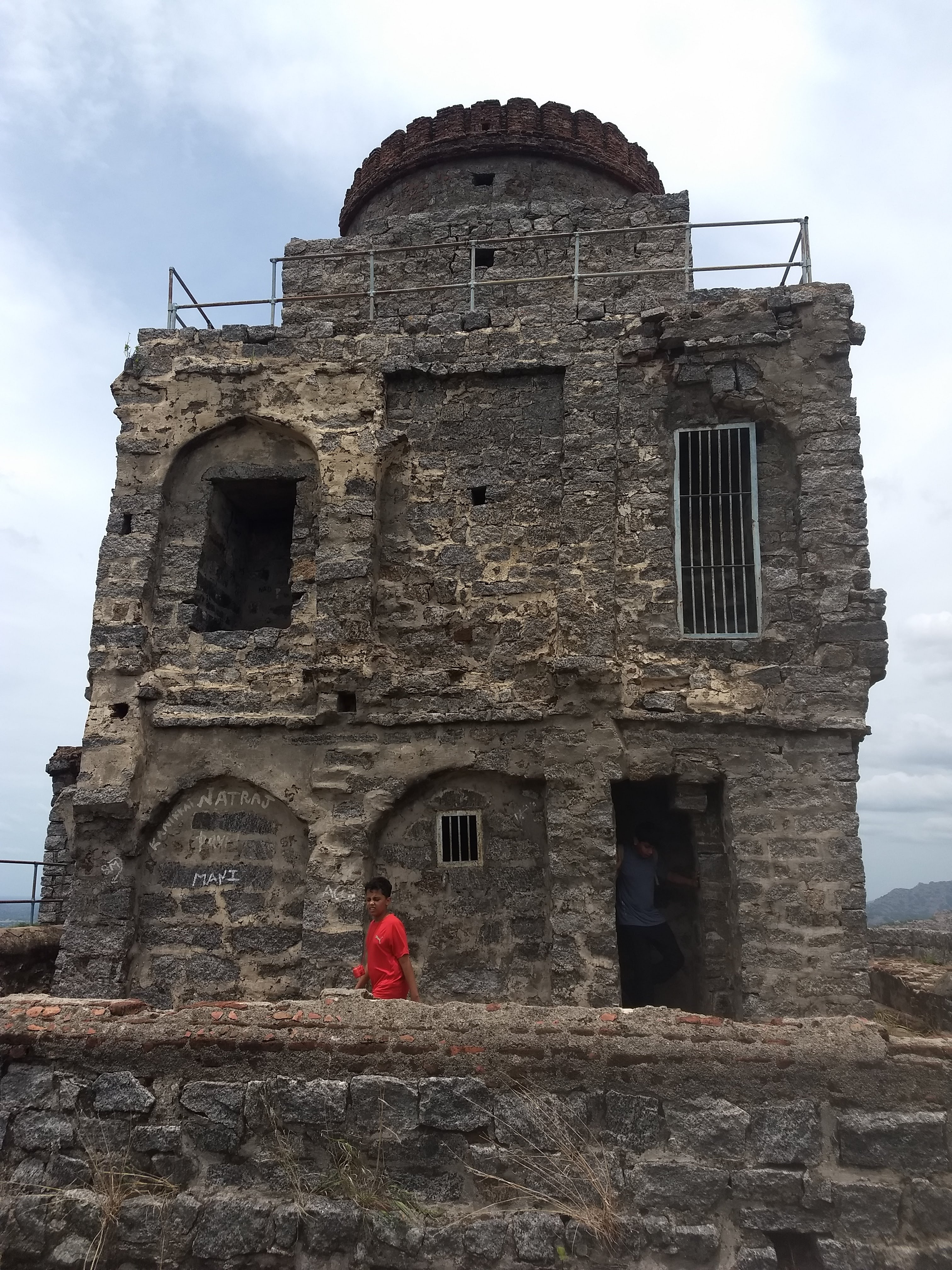
Rajagiri Fort

== See also ==
- Gingee Venkataramana Temple
- Chenjiamman
- Senji Singavaram Ranganatha Temple
- Military history of India
