= Senji Singavaram Ranganatha Temple =

Cave temple in Tamil Nadu, India

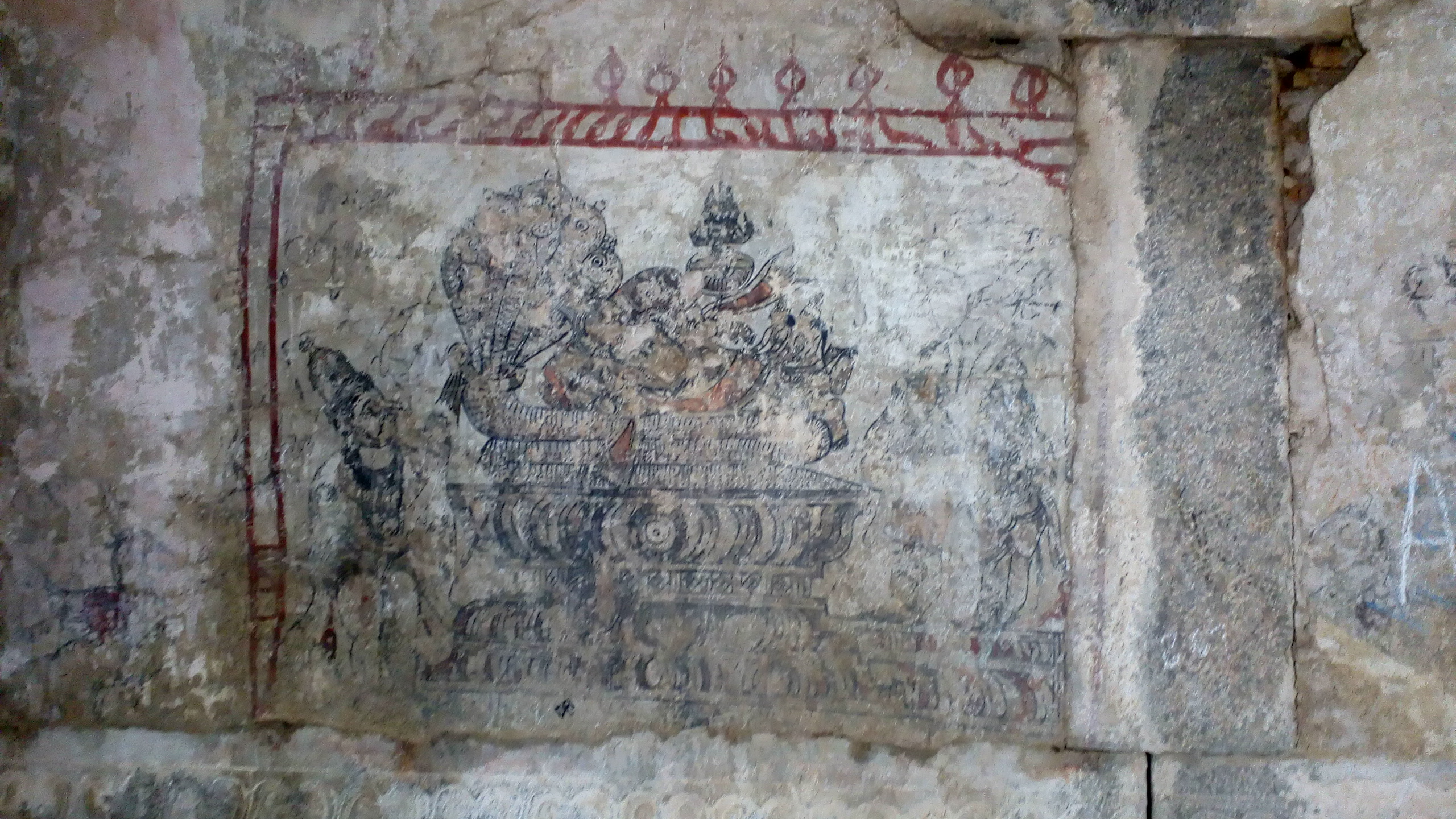
Wall drawings

The Senji Singavaram Ranganatha Temple (aka Singavaram Perumal Temple) is a cave-temple in India dedicated to the god Ranganatha and the goddess Ranganayaki Thayar. The temple is a Pallava period structure, and was reconstructed and patronized by Krishnapa Nayakkar of Senji Nayak dynasty.

== Description ==
The Singavaram Ranganatha temple is located about 4 miles (6 km) from the Gingee Fort, with the Queen's Fort linked by tunnels to this temple. The 24-foot (7.3 m) long idol of Ranganatha, carved from living rock, is in a reclining pose on the coils of the serpent Ananta. A panel in the rear wall depicts the Gandharvas and Brahma, in which Brahma is born from the navel of Vishnu. Besides Garuda, the demons Madhu and Kaitabha who were killed by Vishnu are depicted. The goddess Bhoomidevi graces the feet of the lord while Prahlada sits near his knee.

Pallava cave temples, cut from rock, dating to the time of Mahendravarman or Narisimhavarman (580-688 AD), exist in Melacceri as Maddileshvara temple and at Singavaram as Ranganatha temple. As per the Mandagapattu inscription, the Pallava king, Mahendravarman I established the tradition of the Ranganatha temple. Historian KR Srinivasan suggests Durga and Vishnu of this shrine are similar to some cave shrines of Mahabalipuram; and suggests the name "Singavaram" might be derived from another Pallava king, Mamalla who was either Narasimha or Simhavishnu. KR Srinivasan also notes the Dwarapalas in this temple follow Pallava iconography. Durga with 4 hands holding the Shankha, Chakra, and two arms resting on her thigh and waist, stands on the head of Mahishasura.

== Legend ==
The Sthalapurana of the temple associates it with the legend of Prahlada, born to the demon-king Hiranyakashipu.

An inscription of kōpperuñjinga (a Kadava chieftain) in the Singavaram temple mentions the deity is tiruppanrikkunru emperuman possibly meaning a shrine intended for Varaha Perumal.

In a later legend, Nayaks of Gingee Krishnappa Nayakkar kept a flower garden dedicated to Lord Varadaraja Perumal. But Perumal in the form of a boar (Varaha) destroys the garden. Krishnappa Nayakar chases the animal but could not kill it. The boar goes to Singavaram, bores himself into a cave, then reveals his propria persona to the nayak. Bewildered, the nayak invokes the blessings of the Singavaram god; who then directs him to build a temple with the help of an ascetic. The ascetic attempts to kill the nayak, but the nayak kills the ascetic instead and his dead body becomes gold, using which the temple of Ranganatha inside the Gingee fort was built, and the Singavaram temple was built (refurbished).

The Shashthipurti celebration in this temple is associated with a legend of Desingh Raja. This temple was his tutelary deity (Kuldev). As per local ballads on the legend, Raja Desingh sought the God's blessings before his battle against Sadatullah Khan, the Arcot Nawab, in 1714 AD. But the deity turned his head aside marking his disapproval. However, Raja Desigh in haste proceeded with his war plans and was killed. Dumont notes Raja Desingh had his own Muslim ally, while Sadatullah Khan had Hindu advisors. In the legend and ballads, God Ranganatha worried at the raja's plans to proceed with the battle, appears in front of Desingh's young wife who then seeks his permission for Sati. He tries to dissuade her at first but agrees at her insistence and blesses her and her deceased husband with boons.

== See also ==
- Gingee Fort
- Gingee Venkataramana Temple
- Chenjiamman
