= Achan (title) =

Keralite title of nobility

Achan is a title that was mainly in use by the eldest male members of a family in Kerala, India. It is a word for father in Malayalam Language. The Christian Priest is also called "Achan" in Kerala. They mainly belong to wealthy families from different communities.

There were many Achan families who were historically significant in Kerala.

● The Paliath Achans, who were cheftians of areas in Thrissur and North Paravur, were given rights as the hereditary prime ministers of the Maharajah of Cochin in the year 1632.

● The Mangat Achans of Calicut who were by tradition, prominent landlords and hereditary prime ministers under the Zamorin.

● The male members of the ruling family of Palakkad (Kombi Achan) also bore the title Achan.

● Meenachil Karthas who were members of a royal family, which ruled the kingdom of Meenachil from the 15th century AD until 1754 were given the title Njanachan by the cheraman perumals).

● Vaniya Nairs also held Achan title For example, Kunjikannan Ezhuthachan, a Vaniya Nair, was conferred the title "Nambrath Achan," by the kolathiri where Nambram refers to a place.

Other Achans of Malabar included:

• Eranholi Achan of Thalassery

• Cheruvalli Achan who were also known as the Venganad Nampidi of Kollengode bore the title.

• Kalathil achan of Malabar.
