= Veluthedath Nair =

Nair Sub Caste

Veluthedath Nair, also spelled as Veluthedathu Nair is a temple oriented Service Caste within Nair community in Kerala, in India. They use 'Nair' surname. They are distributed in almost all districts of Kerala. Their major role and hereditary duty was submitting Thiru Udayaada, a sacred cloth for adorning deities in temples. The term "Veluthedath" means "purify" or "whiten" and it indicates their role in submission of clean sacred cloths in Temples and ritual purification in various occasions. Veluthedath Nairs belonged to Non Military Nair Sub group as they were associated with Temple service.

== Roles and Traditional Occupation ==
Veluthedath Nair is a temple oriented service caste and their major role was submitting a specific sacred cloth which is known as "Thiru Udayaada" or "Thiru Vasthra" to the deities. This specific cloth is also known as "God's dress".Veluthedath Nairs also performed ritualistic purificatory ceremonies in various occasions. They did ceremonial purification, often using ash-water mixtures on clothing, which was considered necessary for ritual purity. Pothuven, A Sub sect of Veluthedath Nair caste in older Cochin state had role in performing purificatory ceremonies. The sacred specialists from Veluthedath Nair caste were responsible for performing birth rites among the Nair community. When someone from the Nair community died, the death news was announced throughout the village by a Veluthedath Nair. Initially they belonged to Ambalavasis and later integrated into the wider Nair community due to some socio-economic reasons. Then they turned to smaller jobs to earn a living.

== Historical references ==
According to Kerala Mahathmyam, the first book discussing on the formation of labour based caste divisions in Kerala, it is portrayed that Veluthedath Nairs were initially brahmins who were outcast from the community by lord parashurama and made to serve temples by submitting sacred clothes to gods. They also used to wore sacred thread (punool) in the past. Parashurama instructed them to abandon the sacred thread and to attach it to their garment instead.

== Important Verdicts ==
The Kerala High court on Friday, 10 july 2015 in a judgement titled VM Sasi v/s Kishore held that the petitioner who belongs to the sub-sect of ‘Veluthedath Nair’, no doubt, a Nair for all practical purposes and therefore, he could not be treated as an ‘Avarna Hindu’.“When he belongs to a sub-sect of the Nair community, he squarely falls within the category of the fourth ‘Varna’ namely ‘Shudra’. Hence he is a Savarna Hindu,” the court held.

== Reservation Policy ==
The Veluthedath Nair Caste is classified as an Other Backward Class (OBC) by the Government of Kerala, although some other sections of the Nair community are considered as forward caste(General Category). Nair Sub castes like Kiriyathil Nair, Illathu Nair, Swaroopathil Nair, Charna Nair, etc are classified as Forward castes whereas some sub castes like Veluthedathu Nair, Vilakkithala Nair, Chakkala Nair, Vaniya Nair etc are classified as Other backward Classes. This categorization is for social upliftment to ensure these communities receive necessary educational and employment benefits.

== See also ==
- Vilakkithala Nair
- Padamangalam Nair
- Ezhuthachan (caste)
