= Konar (caste) =

Hindu pastoral caste

- Religions: Hinduism
- Languages: Tamil
- Related groups: Tamil people

Konar is a Hindu caste found in the Indian state of Tamil Nadu. They are traditionally a pastoral community involved in cattle herding and cultivation. They are a part of the Yadav community, and are also known as Ayar and Idaiyar, and appear in the ancient Sangam literature as occupants of the Mullai (forest region). (Note: The five regions that comprised the Sangam landscapes are literary devices, not geographical areas.)

== Etymology ==
According to Alf Hiltebeitel, Konar is a Tamil caste who can trace their origin to Yadava, the caste to which Krishna belongs. Several Vaishnavite texts associate Krishna with the Aayar caste, or Konar, most notably the Thiruppavai, composed by goddess Andal herself, most notably referring Krishna as the “Aayar kulathu mani vilakke”. The caste name is interchangeable with the names Konar and Kovalar being derived from Tamil word Kōn, which can mean "king" and "herdsmen". The word might be derived from the Tamil word kōl, a herdsman's staff. The Tamil word kōl also means a king's sceptre.

The word Ayar might be derived from the Tamil word Aa, meaning cow. The term idai (middle) might refer to the Mullai region, being an intermediate zone between two other Sangam landscapes called Kurinji (hilly region) and Marutham (cultivation region), but probably reflected their intermediate socio-economic status. Idaiyar remains the most commonly used word in Tamil for a cow-herder, and another name for Ayars was pothuvar, meaning common.

== History ==
According to medieval inscriptions, the Konars are mentioned as Nandaputras of Yadava lineage. Historically, some of them have held positions such as kings and chieftains.

== See also ==
- Velir
- Ay dynasty
- Maniyani (caste)
- Golla
- Gavli
- Mayon
