= Kingdoms of Kerala =

Kingdoms in southern India

Kerala is one of the southernmost states of India. During the early historic period, or possibly even earlier, the region under the Chera rulers is recorded to have established trade relations across the Arabian Sea/Indian Ocean with the Middle East and the Greco-Roman world, as part of the spice trade, particularly in pepper. The medieval Cheras of Kerala, although at times subject to the influence of more powerful rulers of southern India, continued to dominate the region until the 12th century CE. Following the disintegration of the Chera kingdom, several minor states arose in Kerala, the most notable being the kingdoms of Quilon (Venad), Calicut (ruled by the Zamorins), and Cannanore (or Kolathunad).

In 1498 CE, Portuguese navigator Vasco Da Gama established a direct sea route to Asia by sailing around the Cape of Good Hope, at the southern tip of Africa, and landing at the port of Calicut (Kozhikode), where he encountered long-established Middle Eastern Muslim merchants. The Portuguese were soon followed by the Dutch, the French and finally by the English. By the late 18th century, the English had overpowered all the other European powers on the Malabar Coast. After a brief period of Mysorean hegemony, the English East India Company took direct control of northern Kerala, including the former territories of Cannanore and Calicut. They also brought the kingdoms of Travancore, recently consolidated under its charismatic ruler, Marthanda Varma, and Cochin in southern and central Kerala under their influence. British control over Kerala continued until India achieved independence in 1947.

== History of Kerala ==
=== Early historic period ===
Kerala's dominant rulers during the early historic period were the Cheras, a dynasty with one of its headquarters located at Vanchi-Karur, near the celebrated port city of Muchiri (Muziris) on the Malabar Coast. The Chera state comprised a major part of present-day Kerala and western Tamil Nadu.

The Cheras were mentioned as "Ketalaputo" (Sanskrit: "Keralaputra") in the 2nd Major Rock Edict of Maurya emperor Asoka (3rd century BCE), as "Cerobothra" in the Greek text Periplus of the Erythraean Sea (1st century CE), and as "Celebothras" in Pliny the Elder's (1st century CE) the Roman encyclopedia Natural History. The Chera country, located at the southern tip of the Indian peninsula, was ideally positioned to benefit from maritime trade across the vast Indian Ocean networks. Historical sources confirm active exchange of spices — particularly black pepper — with merchants from the Middle East and the Graeco-Roman world.

The Ezhimala polity existed in northern Kerala, while the Ay chiefs, under the Pandyas, ruled the region south of the Chera kingdom (southern Kerala).

=== Medieval period ===
Following the collapse of the medieval Cheras (early 12th century CE), several independent feudal states emerged across Kerala. Among these, the kingdoms of Venad (Kollam or Quilon), Perumpadappu (later Kochi or Cochin), and Kolathunadu (Kannur or Cannanore) attained prominence owing to their superior political authority and economic strength. The smaller principalities and their rulers largely remained subordinate to these dominant states and functioned under their sphere of influence. In the course of time, the states of Kochi or Cochin and Kolathunadu gradually came under the dominance of the state of Kozhikode or Calicut (ruled by the Samoothiris or the Zamorins).

During the medieval period, Kerala's cultural and political landscape underwent profound transformation, characterised by the consolidation of increasingly rigid social hierarchies. At the same time, however, Malayalam literature, Kerala art forms, Hindu temple culture, and maritime commerce flourished. The Indian Ocean spice trade in particular remained highly prosperous, being conducted largely under the dominance of Middle Eastern merchants and navigators.

=== Modern Kerala ===
In the late 15th century, Portuguese navigators arrived on the Malabar Coast with the intention of displacing the long-established Middle Eastern merchants who dominated the Indian Ocean trade network. During this period, the principal centres of power in Kerala were the kingdoms of Kozhikode (Calicut; ruled by the Samoothiris), Kannur (Cannanore; the Chirakkal), and Kollam (Quilon or Venad), while Kochi (Cochin) emerged somewhat later as an important political force. Their predominance, however, diminished considerably over the course of the 16th century with the progressive expansion of Portuguese influence, followed subsequently by Dutch ascendancy. In due course, the Dutch effectively displaced the Portuguese from the Malabar Coast altogether.

Following the rise of the English East India Company in the 18th century, the Dutch gradually began to lose the supremacy they had previously exercised on the Malabar Coast. Over time, the greater part of Kerala's spice trade passed into English hands, while a smaller share remained under French influence. By this period, the once-powerful states of Kozhikode (or Calicut; ruled by the Zamorins) and Kolathunadu (the Chirakkal) had experienced a marked economic decline. During the Mysore's expansion into northern Kerala (late 18th century), these weakened states were annexed into its dominions. Only the states of Cochin and Travancore remained independent; by this period, Travancore had already absorbed the numerous petty principalities of south Kerala into a consolidated state. Following the defeat of Mysore by the English Company, the latter assumed control over the entirety of northern Kerala, which was subsequently administered as the Malabar District. Both Cochin and Travancore soon accepted English suzerainty and were acknowledged as "princely states", a status they retained until the independence of India in 1947.

== Culture and religion ==
=== Religious pluralism ===
Almost all of the states of Kerala were ruled by elite Hindu families. Although the rulers adhered to Hinduism, they maintained close associations with communities belonging to other religious traditions, particularly Christianity and Islam. Christian and Muslim groups constituted significant economic forces within the kingdoms of Kerala and exercised considerable influence in society. Kerala's rulers generally recognized the value of diversity and permitted a substantial degree of autonomy to various ethnic and religious communities. This broader social order was also characterized by significant economic and administrative decentralization. Merchant guilds, chartered ports, Hindu temples, Christian churches and Muslim mosques functioned as important pillars of society.

A number of records attest to the tradition of religious pluralism fostered by Kerala's rulers. The Paliyam Copper Plates issued by Vikramaditya, a minor Hindu ruler from southern Kerala, indicate that Buddhist temples enjoyed royal patronage in the late 9th century CE. Similarly, the Quilon Syrian copper plates, issued during the period of the medieval Chera state, record a grant of land to the Christian church at the port of Kollam, together with extensive trading rights and aristocratic privileges, in the 9th century CE. Muslim merchants from the Middle East are also mentioned in these plates. The Viraraghava Copper Plate, dated to c. 1225 CE, documents concessions granted by king Viraraghava, ruler of the port city of Kodungallur, to a Syrian Christian merchant. Likewise, the Jewish copper plates of Cochin of Cochin, issued by Bhaskara Ravi, a medieval Chera ruler, c. 1000 CE, record the royal grant of trading rights and aristocratic privileges to the Jewish merchant Joseph Rabban.

=== Matrilineal succession ===
Almost all of the states of Kerala, including the Muslim one, practised marumakkathayam, a system of matrilineal inheritance. Under this system, descent and the inheritance of property were passed from the maternal uncle to his nephews or nieces. A child's rights lay with the maternal uncle or the mother's family rather than with the father or the father's family. Through this bloodline, names, titles, property, and everything belonging to the child were inherited from the mother or maternal uncle. Usually, after a king, his younger brothers succeeded to the throne, and after them, their eldest nephew through their sisters succeeded, with the cycle passing on to the next generation. The son of a king might sometimes receive a courtesy title but had no place in the line of succession. In the absence of nephews, nieces could also sometimes succeed to the kingdom.

== List of kingdoms ==
=== Iron Age/Early historic period ===
- Ezhimala rulers
- Chera Kingdom
- Ay rulers

=== Early Medieval period ===
- Ezhimala Kingdom
- Chera Kingdom
- Ay Kingdom

=== Late Medieval period ===
- Kolathunadu (later called Chirakkal)
- Cochin (Perumpadappu)
- Calicut (Nediyirippu)
- Venad

=== Modern period ===
- Travancore
- Cochin
