= Linga Balija =

Subcaste of the Indian Balija caste

Total population
- 15 Lakhs

Regions with significant populations
- Andhra Pradesh, Telangana, Karnataka, Tamilnadu, Kerala, Maharashtra

Languages
- Telugu, Kannada, Tamil, Malayalam

Religion
- Hinduism

Related ethnic groups
- Other Balija Subgroups

Linga Balija is a community living in the Indian states of Andhra Pradesh and Telangana. They are one of the subcastes of the Balija caste.

The Linga Balijas are a Telugu speaking trading community primarily residing in the Indian state of Andhra Pradesh. In Karnataka, they are known as Linga Banajigas and in Tamil Nadu, they are known as Linga Vadugars. They are now called Jangam.

Linga Balijas, who are traders, are described in the Madras Census Report of 1901 as a Lingayat sub-caste of the Balija community.

== Etymology ==
Variations of the name used in the medieval era include Balanja, Bananja, Bananju, Banajiga, and Banijiga, with probable cognates such as Balijiga, Valanjiyar, Balanji, Bananji, and Baliga, as well as derivatives like Vani (in Maharashtra). All of these are said to be derived from the Sanskrit term "Vanik" or "Vanij," meaning trader.

Another etymological theory suggests that "Balija" is derived from the Sanskrit word "Bali," meaning a sacrifice made during the 'Yagna' ritual, and "Ja," meaning born. Therefore, "Balija" translates to "born from sacrifice."

Balijas, who followed Lingayatism or Veerashaivism referred to themselves as Linga Balijas. These are the Lingayats proper and form the bulk of the community. They are known as Linga Balijas in Telangana.

== Origin ==
The following legendary account of the origin of the "Linga Bhojunnalawaru" is given in the Baramahal Records:

Para Brahma, or the great god Brahma, created Pralayakala Rudra, a fierce form of the god Shiva, associated with the day of destruction. Brahma also created four sages, known as the Chatur Acharyulu, named Panditaraju, Yekcoramalu, Murralaradulu, and Somaluradulu, and taught them mantras or prayers, appointing them as his deputies.

At one time, the Asuras (giants) and the Devatas (gods) waged war against each other. In response, Pralayakala Rudra created a being from his nose, whom he named Muchari Rudra. Muchari Rudra had five sons, and together they went to assist the Devatas, enabling them to defeat the Asuras. In recognition of their service, the gods conferred upon Muchari Rudra and his sons several honorary distinctions.

- A flag with the figure of an alligator (crocodile) portrayed on it.
- A flag with the figure of a fish portrayed on it.
- A flag with the figure of a bullock.
- A flag with the figure of an eagle.
- A flag with the figure of a bell.
- A modee ganta, or iron for marking cattle.

The use of burning lamps and flambeaus during their daytime public processions, as well as the use of tents, is attributed to this tradition.

Once, when the god Pralayakala Rudra, along with Mochari Rudra, his five sons, and other celestial attendants, were assembled on Kailāsa Parvata, the mountain of Paradise, the god instructed them to descend to Bhuloka, the earthly world, and to increase and multiply their species. They humbly asked how they could return to the divine presence. He replied, "I shall manifest myself in Bhuloka in the form of the Lingam. Worship me in that form, and you will be permitted to approach me again." They then descended to the earthly regions, and from them, the present castes of Balijawaras trace their origin.

== Native ==
The Linga Balijas are primarily reside in Andhra Pradesh, Telangana, Tamil Nadu, and Karnataka, but also live in Kerala, Maharashtra and to a lesser extent.

== History ==
Beginning in the 9th century, inscriptions throughout the Kannada and Tamil regions reference a trading network, sometimes described as a guild, known as the Five Hundred Lords of Ayyavolu. This network facilitated trade links between communities in Tamil Nadu and Karnataka.

From the 13th century, inscriptions referring to "Vira Balanjyas" (warrior merchants) began appearing in the Andhra region. The Vira Balanjyas, whose origins are often traced back to the Ayyavolu, were part of long-distance trading networks that employed fighters to protect their warehouses and goods in transit. These traders were identified as nanadesi ("of many countries") and swadesi ("of one's own country"). The terms balanjya-setti and balija were also used for these traders, and in later periods, they were referred to as naidu and chetti.

These traders formed collectives known as pekkandru and distinguished themselves from other collectives called nagaram, which likely represented Komati merchants. The pekkandru collectives also included members of other communities with status titles such as reddi, boya, and nayaka. They spread throughout South India, Sri Lanka, and even into some Southeast Asian countries.

Velcheru Narayana Rao and others note that the Balijas were first politically mobilized by the Vijayanagara emperor Krishnadevaraya. Later, in the 15th and 16th centuries, they colonized the Tamil region and established Nayaka chieftaincies. During this period, the Balijas were leaders of the left-hand section of castes. These Balija warriors were known for their fearlessness, with some accounts describing them as assassinating kings who interfered with their affairs. Cynthia Talbot suggests that in Andhra, the transformation of occupational descriptors into caste-based identifiers did not occur until at least the 17th century.

The classification of people as Balija posed significant challenges for census enumerators during the British Raj era, who sought to simplify a complex social system into a manageable administrative framework using theories of evolutionary anthropology. (Note: The Raj theories of evolutionary anthropology, typified by the work of H. H. Risley, are nowadays considered to be scientific racism.) Early census attempts in the Madras Presidency recorded a wide variety of people claiming to be members of Balija subcastes, who often appeared to have little in common and thus defied the administrative goal of creating a rational and convenient taxonomy.

For instance, those identifying as Chetty were clearly connected through their involvement in trade, while those calling themselves Kavarai were simply using the Tamil term for Balija. However, other groups, such as the Linga Balija, based their claim to Balija status on sectarian identification, the Gazula were bangle-makers by profession, the Telaga had Telugu origins, and the Rajamahendram seemed to base their claim on their geographic origin in the town of Rajahmundry. Subsequent attempts to rationalize the enumeration led to further anomalies and dissatisfaction.

== Occupation ==
The Traditional occupation of Linga Balija is trading. Many of them are engaged in agriculture, business, petty trade and jobs in Government Offices and in factories. Some of them are shopkeepers, cloth merchants, bangle sellers, grain dealers and bankers and a few of them have become rich and are regarded as the wealthiest section of the community. Very few are temple priests in Tamil Nadu.

== Dynasty ==
- Hande Nayakas
- Later Keladi Nayakas

== Rulers ==
- Hande Nayakas

Linga Balijas of the Hande family from Ananthapur, Bukkarayapatnam and Dharmavaram.

- Hande Hanumappa Nayudu (1569–1582)
- Immadi Hampa Naidu (1583–1595)
- Malakappa Naidu (1595–1619)
- Hampa Naidu (1619–1631) Hande Malakappa Naidu's (1595–1619) 4th Son
- Siddappa Naidu (1631–1659)
- Pavadappa Naidu (1659–1671)
- Ramakka Naidu (1671–1690)
- Siddappa Naidu (1690–1696)
- Prasannappa Naidu (1696–1719)
- Pavadappa Naidu (1719–1737)
- Siddappa Naidu (1737–1740)
- Ramappa Naidu (1740–1745)
- Tadipatri and Poddatur. Hande Malakappa Naidu's (1595–1619) 1st Son Devappa Naidu and his descendents.
- Bellari, Kurgodu and Surrounding Districts. Hande Malakappa Naidu's (1595–1619) 2nd Son Chinna Ramappa Naidu and his descendents.
- Konderpi and Kanakal. Hande Malakappa Naidu's (1595–1619) 3rd Son Lingappa Naidu and his descendents
- Later Keladi Nayakas
- Shivappa Nayaka (1645–1660)
- Chikka Venkatappa Nayaka (1660–1662)
- Bhadrappa Nayaka (1662–1664)
- Somashekara Nayaka I (1664–1672)
- Keladi Chennamma (1672–1697)
- Basavappa Nayaka (1697–1714)
- Somashekara Nayaka II (1714–1739)
- Kiriya Basavappa Nayaka (1739–1754)
- Chenna Basappa Nayaka (1754–1757)
- Virammaji (1757–1763).

== Status ==
In 2019, representatives of the Telangana state Veerashaiva Lingayat Federation petitioned the National Commission for Backward Classes to include Linga Balija and Veerashaiva Lingayat in the Central Government's list of Other Backward Classes. In 2022, Member of Parliament B. B. Patil met with the Minister of Social Justice and Empowerment, Virendra Kumar Khatik, to discuss the inclusion of these two subcastes in the OBC list.

== Other Names ==
- Lingadhari Jangamar
- Lingadhari Pandaram
- Lingangatti Pandaram
- Linga Pandaram
- Linga Vadugar
- Lingayat Vadugar
- Lingayath
- Lingayath Naidu
- Lingayath Nayaka
- Lingayath Kapu
- Linga Kapu
- Lingayat Vani(veerashaiva)
- Lingayath Gajula
- Lingayath Balija
- Veerashaiva Balija
- Veerashaiva Lingayath Balija
- Linga Banajiga
- Lingayath Banajiga
- Veerashaiva Banajiga
- Veerashaiva Lingayath Banajiga
- Sivachar Kavarai
- Jangamar
- Jangam.

== Family Names ==
Family Names of Lingaya Balijas

Most family names or surnames of Lingayat Balijas/Banajigas are either:

1. Village Headmanship Names:

- Deshmukh

- Desais

- Patils

- Gowdas

- Appa (e.g., Jayadevappa, Haralappa, Yedurappa, Mallasarja Desai)

2. Names Based on Villages They Migrated From or Led:

- Lingadalli

- Davenagere

- Shivamogga

- Hospet

- Kalaburagi

- Munagala

- Rayachoti

- Kotturi

3. Names Related to Their Business, Trading, or Cultivating Crops:

- Pogaku

- Kandi

- Akula

- Patti

- Shetty

- Bowrshetty

- Miriyala

- Nelli

- Vadla

- Chatla

- Aamudaala

- Doodi

- Pattu

- Gurrala

- Aavula

== Notable peoples ==
- B. S. Yediyurappa Chief Minister of Karnataka
- S. Nijalingappa Chief Minister of Karnataka
- J. H. Patel Chief Minister of Karnataka
- S. R. Kanthi Chief Minister of Karnataka
- Veerendra Patil Chief Minister of Karnataka
- Jagadish Shettar Chief Minister of Karnataka
- B. D. Jatti Chief Minister of Karnataka
- Venna Eshwarappa Veerashiva Lingayath Linga Balija Sangam state president
- G.Dinesh patil State Youth President of Raastra Veerashiva Lingayath-Linga Balija Sangham
- B. B. Patil Telangana Veerashaiva Lingayat Federation (TVLF) chairman
