= Banajiga =

Community in the Indian state of Karnataka

Total population
- 15 Lakhs

Regions with significant populations
- Andhra Pradesh, Telangana, Karnataka, Tamil Nadu,

Languages
- Telugu, Kannada, Tamil

Religion
- Hinduism

Related ethnic groups
- Balija

Banajigas are a Kannada-speaking mercantile community primarily living in the Indian state of Karnataka. In Andhra Pradesh and Telangana they are known as Balijas. Banajiga (vanik, tradesman) are Canarese traders, Banajigas now identified as a Lingayats. But Historical records indicate that Banajigas were originally Jains engaged in trade and historically recorded as "Jain Merchants" only later around 16-17th century community gradually converted to Lingayat through the influence of Lingayat priests. Today, Banajigas are regarded as one of the wealthiest sub-caste of Lingayatism, noted for their contributions to temples, monasteries, and religious institutions.

== Etymology ==
Variations of the name in use in the medieval era were Balanja, Bananja, Bananju, Banajiga and Banijiga, with probable cognates Balijiga, Valanjiyar, Balanji, Bananji and derivatives such as Baliga, all of which are said to be derived from the Sanskrit term Vanik or Vanij, for trader.

== Occupation ==
Banajigas are traders and business people. Some are also professionals such as teachers, doctors, and engineers.

== Sub groups ==
- Adi Banajiga
- Balajiga / Banajiga / Gowda Banajiga
- Balegara
- Dasa Banajiga
- Dudi Banajiga
- Ele Banajiga or Thota Banajiga. Ele Banajigas are betel gardeners
- Gandudi Banajiga
- Gazula Banajiga
- Goni Banajiga / Croni Banajiga
- Gopala Banajiga
- Gopati Banajiga
- Janappan
- Jidipalli Banajiga
- Joti Banajiga
- Linga Balija / Linga Banajiga
- Musu Kamma
- Nayudu / Naidu Banajiga
- Panchama Banajiga
- Punavalu Banajiga
- Puvulu Banajiga
- Rajamahendram or Musu Kamma
- Raut / Ravut / Rahutar Banajiga
- Sadu Banajiga
- Setty Balija / Setty Banajiga / Banajiga Setty
- Shilvant / Sheelavant Banajiga
- Sukamanchi Banajiga
- Telaga Balija / Telaga Banajiga
- Uppar Banajiga

- Adi Banajiga

Adi Banajiga are engaged in the priestly functions. Adi Banajiga have been found to do the priestly services in the Goddess temple at saundatti Belgaum District.

- Balegara

- Dasa Banajigas

The Dasa Banajigas of Mysore style themselves Jaina Kshatriya Ramanujas Dasa Banajigas are as they call themselves Jaina Kshatriya Ramanuja-Dasa Vaniyas say they were formerly Jain Kshatriyas, and were converted into Vaishnavism by Ramanujachsrya. They are very clean in their habits, pure vegetarians, and follow the doctrines of Ramanujacharya. They are found in large numbers in Chennapatna (Bangalore District). They do not eat food cooked even by Brahmans, who are not Sri Vaishnavas.

- Dudi Banajiga

Dudi Banajigas are traders in cotton. They are also strict vegetarians, and abstain from eating in the houses of persons other than Brahmans. They have some (eponymous) exogamous clans, e.g., Govila and Babhruvahana, and are found in small numbers in the Kolar District. They have a Purana known as Lakshminarayana Puranam, written for them by their guru Lakshminārayana Sastri.

- Ele Banajigas

Ele Banajigas, as their name implies are betel growers. Some of them are vegetarians.

- Gandudi Banajiga

- Gazulu Banajiga

The Gazula Balija are also known as Gauriputra, Banajiga, Kavarai and Balija Naidu. The Gazula Balija is a subgroup of Balija. Naidu and Nayudu are their titles. The Gazulu are the glass bangles section is also known as Setti Banajiga. This is considered a very respectable division, and it is not unusual for persons of other sections to claim it as their own. They are the dealers in glass bangles, and are at the head of the 18 phanas. Setti is the title applied to persons of this section.

- Goni Banajiga

- Gopala Banajiga

- Gopati Banajiga

- Gowda Banajiga

Gowda means village chiefs. The Banajigas, who were village chiefs, called themselves Gowda Banajigas.

- Linga Banajiga

The Linga Banajigas are a trading section of Lingayats, who are a religious sect, abounding in the Canarese country, whose distinctive characteristic is the wearing of a linga the symbol of the god Siva made of steatite, or soapstone, and enclosed in a metal casket, often of silver, and sometimes encrusted with precious stones, or, among the poorer classes, enclosed in a cloth of a particular colour. The linga should always be worn, both by males and females, and is buried with the corpse. A Lingayat shopkeeper, who was not wearing it, explained that he removed it during working hours, as it was necessary to tell a little lie when doing business.

- Musu Kamma

Musu Kamma Named after a special ear ornament worn by women.

- Nayudu Banajiga

The Nayadu division is said to be the same as Kota division above referred to. On behalf of these, it is claimed that they are Kshatriyas of the Lunar Race, and that the term which is a corrupted form of the Sanskrit 'Nayak,' came to be applied to them when, at the zenith of Vijayanagar rule, the king divided his whole realm into nine districts or provinces and placed at the head of each a man of this caste with the title of Nayak. This division has become much mixed up, the title Nayadu being appropriated by many persons of doubtful origin, such as the children of dancing girls.

- Puvulu Banajiga

Puvvalu Banajigas are flower sellers, are also said to belong to the Gazulu division.

- Rajamahendram Banajiga

The Jidipalli and Rajamahendram originated from the places inhabited by them, but they subse-quently came to denote caste sub-divisions. The members of the latter division are the immigrants from the districts of Nellore, Cuddapah, Anantapur, North Arcot and Chinglepet.

- Raut / Ravut / Rahutar Banajiga

Rāvut or Raut has been recorded as a sub-caste of Balija, and a title of Kannadiyan. The Ravut are a small section living specially in the town of Mysore. They are also known as Oppana Banajigas, because they are said to have been sent into the Mysore country from Vijayanagar to collect the tribute due to that king, oppana meaning appointment. They were all soldiers, and were hence known as Ravuts.

- Sadu Banajiga

The Sadu Banajiga, were once Jainas and later at the time of Vishnuvardhana Hoysala, became Vaishnavas. Therefore, these people are also known as Ramanuja Dasa-Vanijakshatriyas, and were Jaina Kshatriyas once. There are many lineages and gothras among Banajiga people. Some of them like Dasa Banijiga cremate the dead, but most of Banajiga groups bury the dead. They worship Vaishnava gods. Banajigas of Virajpet, however, identify themselves as Sadu Settys. They are small business peoples, mostly betel leaf vendors. They are involved in other kinds of business also.

- Setty Banajiga

Setty Balija or Setty Banajiga are also known as Balija, Kapu, Balija Settlu, Chetty Balija or Banajiga in the different areas of their habitation. Rao, Naidu, Nayudu and Setti are the synonyms of the community . Rao, Naidu, Nayudu and Setty are their titles. They have jati puranam namely " Balija vamsapuranam " which mainly deals with the origin of the community.

== Dynasty ==
- Later Keladi Nayakas
- Chennapatna Nayakas

== Rulers ==
- Shivappa Nayaka (1645–1660)
- Chikka Venkatappa Nayaka (1660–1662)
- Bhadrappa Nayaka (1662–1664)
- Somashekara Nayaka I (1664–1672)
- Keladi Chennamma (1672–1697)
- Basavappa Nayaka (1697–1714)
- Somashekara Nayaka II (1714–1739)
- Kiriya Basavappa Nayaka (1739–1754)
- Chenna Basappa Nayaka (1754–1757)
- Queen Virammaji (1757–1763).
- Belawadi Mallamma (1624–1678)
- Rana Peda Jagadeva Raya
- Rana Immadi Jagadeva Raya
- Rana Ankusa Raya
- Rana Kumara Jagadeva Raya
- Immadi Ankusa Raya

== Status ==
Banajigas are high in social status. The Banajiga caste is included in the Central List of Other Backward Classes (OBCs) for the state of Karnataka.

== Notable people ==
- B. S. Yediyurappa Chief Minister of Karnataka
- S. Nijalingappa Chief Minister of Karnataka
- J. H. Patel Chief Minister of Karnataka
- S. R. Kanthi Chief Minister of Karnataka
- Veerendra Patil Chief Minister of Karnataka
- Jagadish Shettar Chief Minister of Karnataka
- B. D. Jatti Chief Minister of Karnataka
