= Mallikarjuna Temple, Kuruvatti =

Mallikarjuna Temple
- Hindu temple
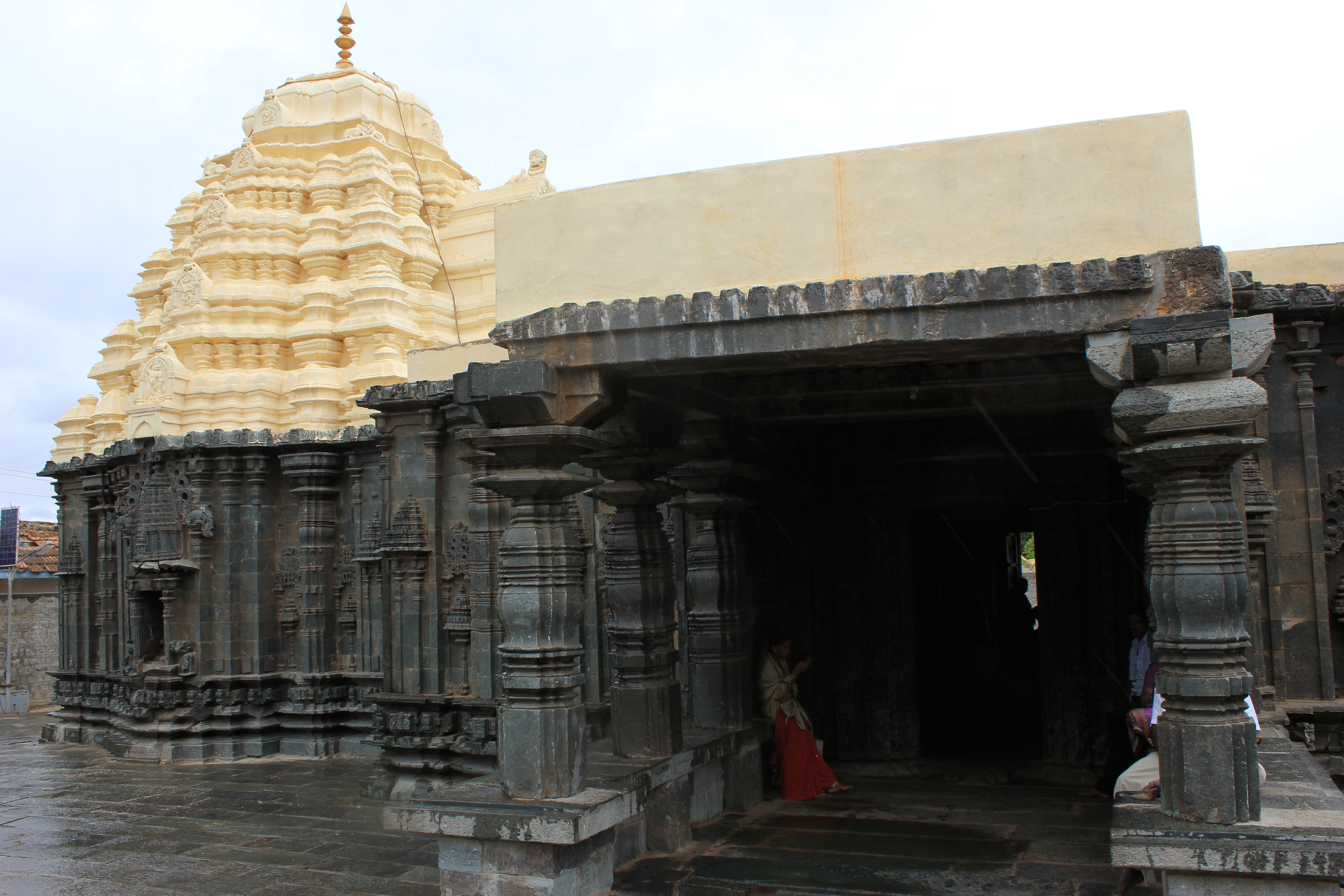
- Mallikarjuna temple (1100 A.D.) at Kuruvatti in Bellary district
- Country: India
- State: Karnataka
- District: Vijayanagara District

Languages
  - Official: Kannada
- Time zone: UTC+5:30 (IST)
- ISO 3166 code: IN-KA

The Mallikarjuna temple is located in the town of Kuruvatti (also spelt Kuruvathi) in the Bellary district of Karnataka state, India. The temple was constructed in the early 12th century rule of the Western Chalukya Empire (also known as the Later or Kalyani Chalukya empire). The temple is protected as a monument of national importance by the Archaeological Survey of India.

Art historian Adam Hardy classifies the architectural style and guild involved in the construction of the temple as a "trans-Tungabhadra branch" of the "mainstream Lakkundi school" of the Later Chalukya style of architecture.

The art historian Ajay Sinha classifies the Kuruvatti style to be a third idiom, the other two being the Lakkundi and Itagi (or Ittagi) schools. He describes the overall achievement at Kuruvatti as "majestic", despite a lack of artistic over indulgence. The building material used is soapstone According to Sinha, a 1099 A.D. inscription at the temple claims it was constructed in service of the god "Abhinava Someshvara" and that the temple also went by the name "Ahavamallesvara". He recants that both names are associated with the deceased Chalukya King Someshvara I who committed voluntary suicide at Kuruvatti in 1062. Sinha feels the temple may have been constructed between 1070 and 1100 in his memory by his heir apparent, the King Vikramaditya VI.

== Temple plan ==
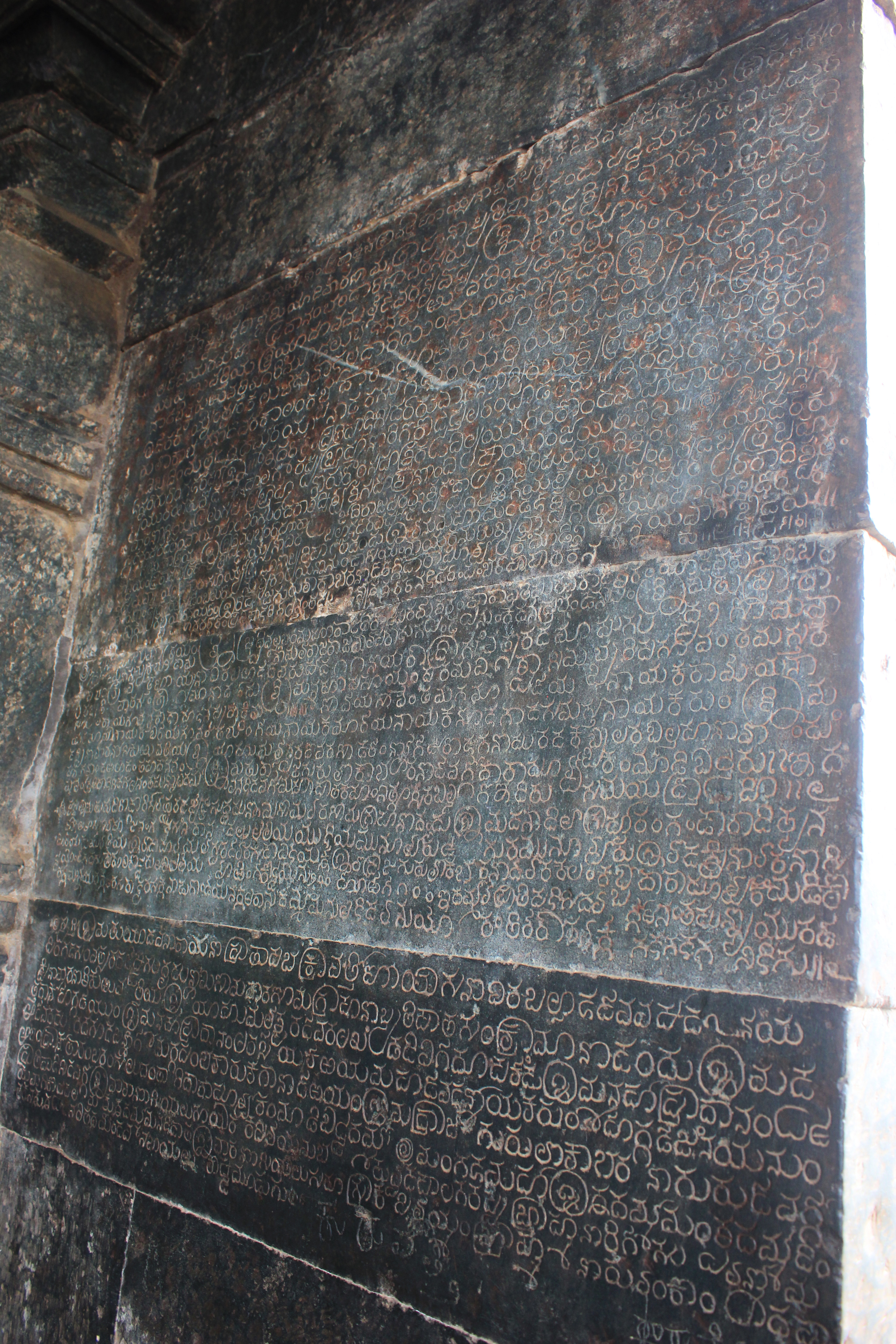
Old Kannada inscription dated 1197 A.D., from the rule of Hoysala King Veera Ballala II, on the porch wall in Mallikarjuna temple at Kuruvatti

The Mallikarjuna temple has a single shrine with a superstructure or tower (ekakuta vimana) with porched entrances from three sides.

According to the art historian Adam Hardy, the existing tower (shikhara) is a later day re-construction.

But the art historian Henry Cousens feels the superstructure and its Kalasha (decorative structure at the peak of tower) are original, though the tower has been whitewashed in more recent times. The temple consists of a sanctum (garbhagriha), an antechamber (also called vestibule or antarala) which connects the sanctum to a gathering hall (sabhamantapa), two halls (mukhamantapa) on either side, and independent of the main temple complex and to the east, a hall (nandimantapa) containing a sculpture of Nandi (the bull, a companion of the Hindu god Shiva). The outer walls of the shrine and hall (mantapa) have been provided with projections and recesses giving rise to niches, in which, in relief, are pilasters (including a new Chalukyan variety), miniature decorative towers (turrets or aedicule), sculptures of Hindu gods, and women displaying stylized feminine features (salabanjika or madanika). According to Cousens, the presence of miniature decorative towers on the shrine walls is noteworthy because most other Western Chalukya constructions have these reliefs only on the superstructure over the shrine. Cousens feels the specimens of makara (mythical beasts) on the shrine walls are exceptionally delicate with "tails of flowing arabesque" standing out free from the background material. Inside, the entrance to the antechamber has a highly decorated lintel with motifs of aquatic creatures (makara torana).

== Gallery ==
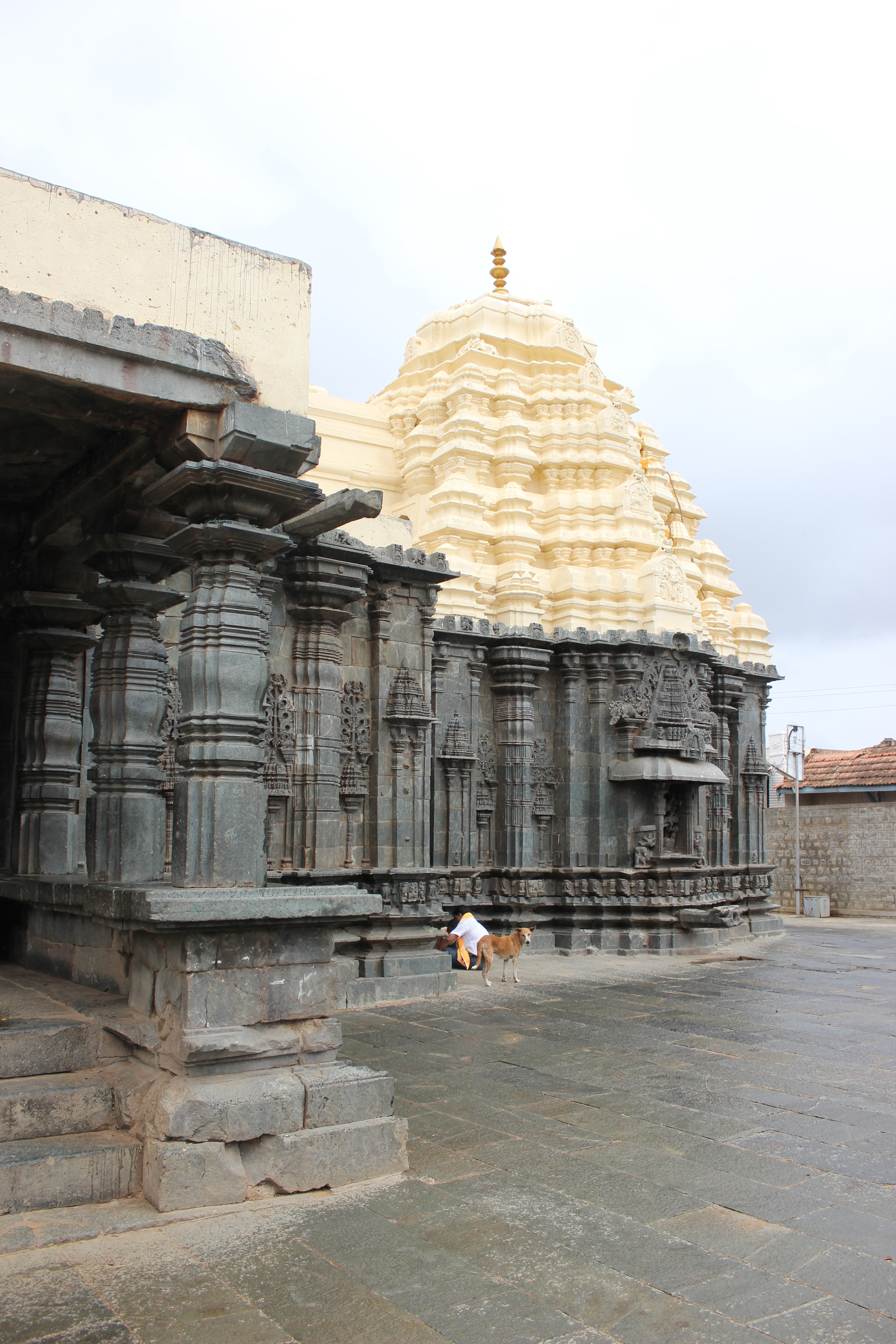
Profile of Mallikarjuna temple at Kuruvatti

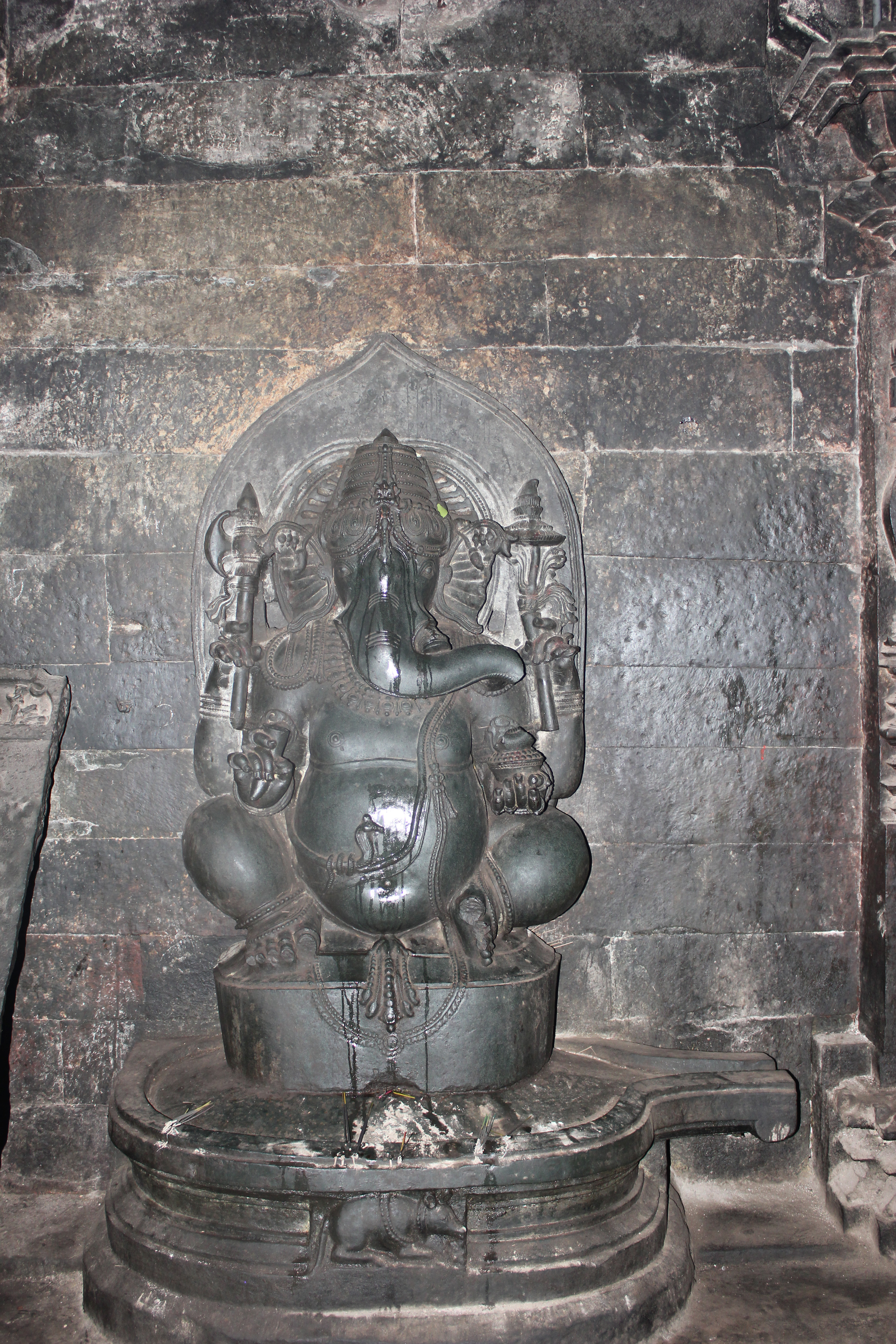
A sculpture of the Hindu god Ganesha in Mallikarjuna temple at Kuruvatti

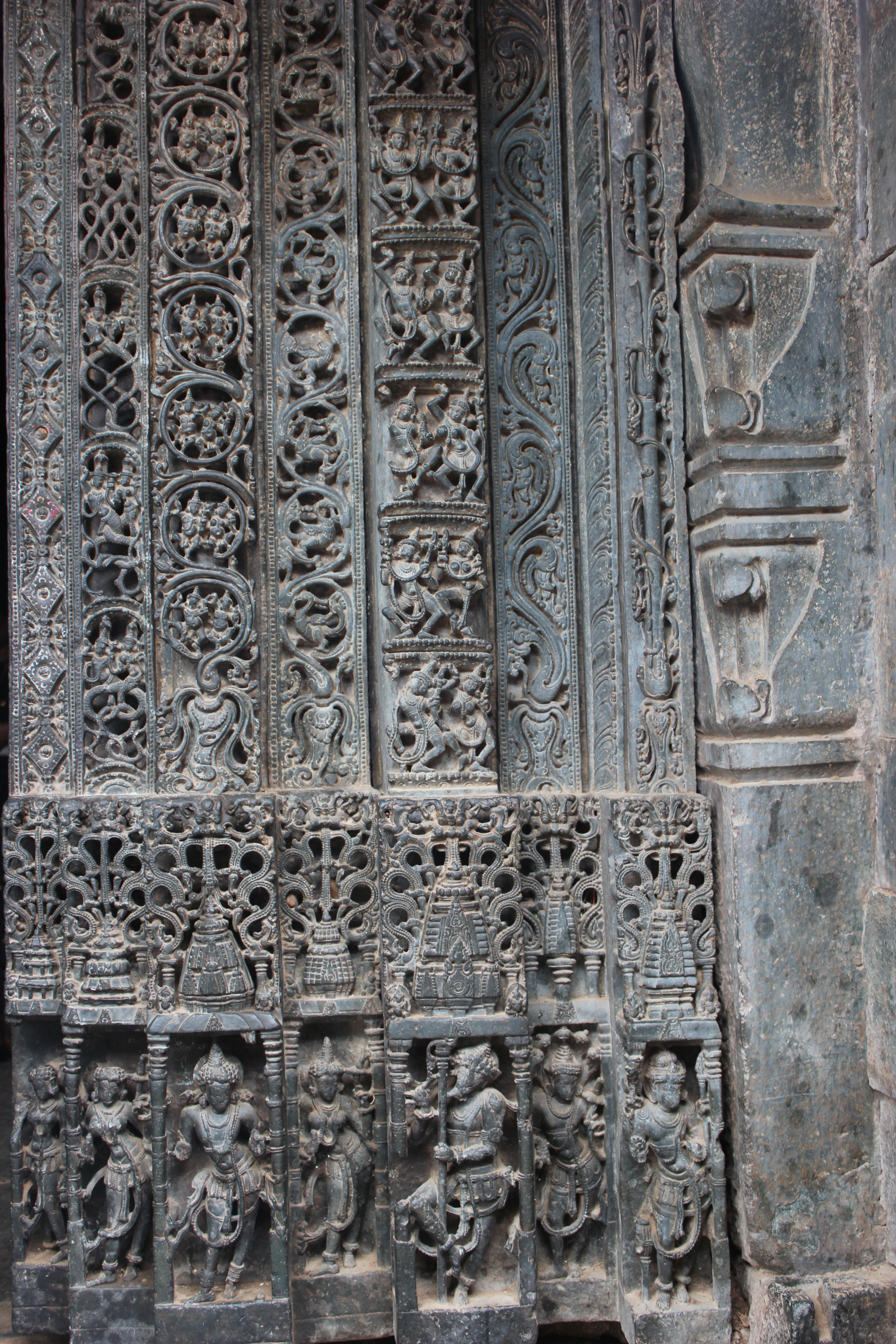
Ornate shrine entrance doorjamb inMallikarjuna temple at Kuruvatti

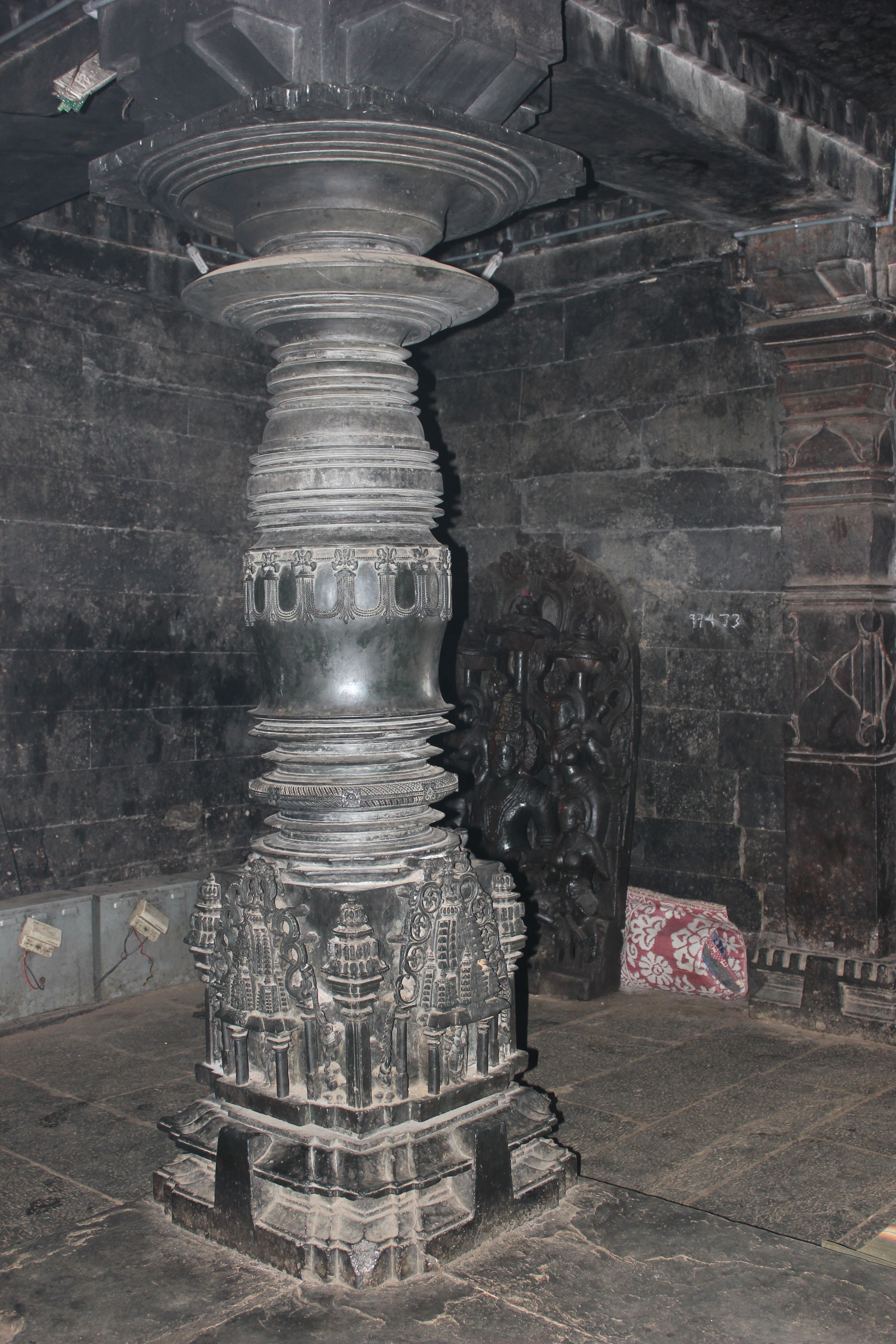
Lathe turned pillar with ornate base in Mallikarjuna temple at Kuruvatti

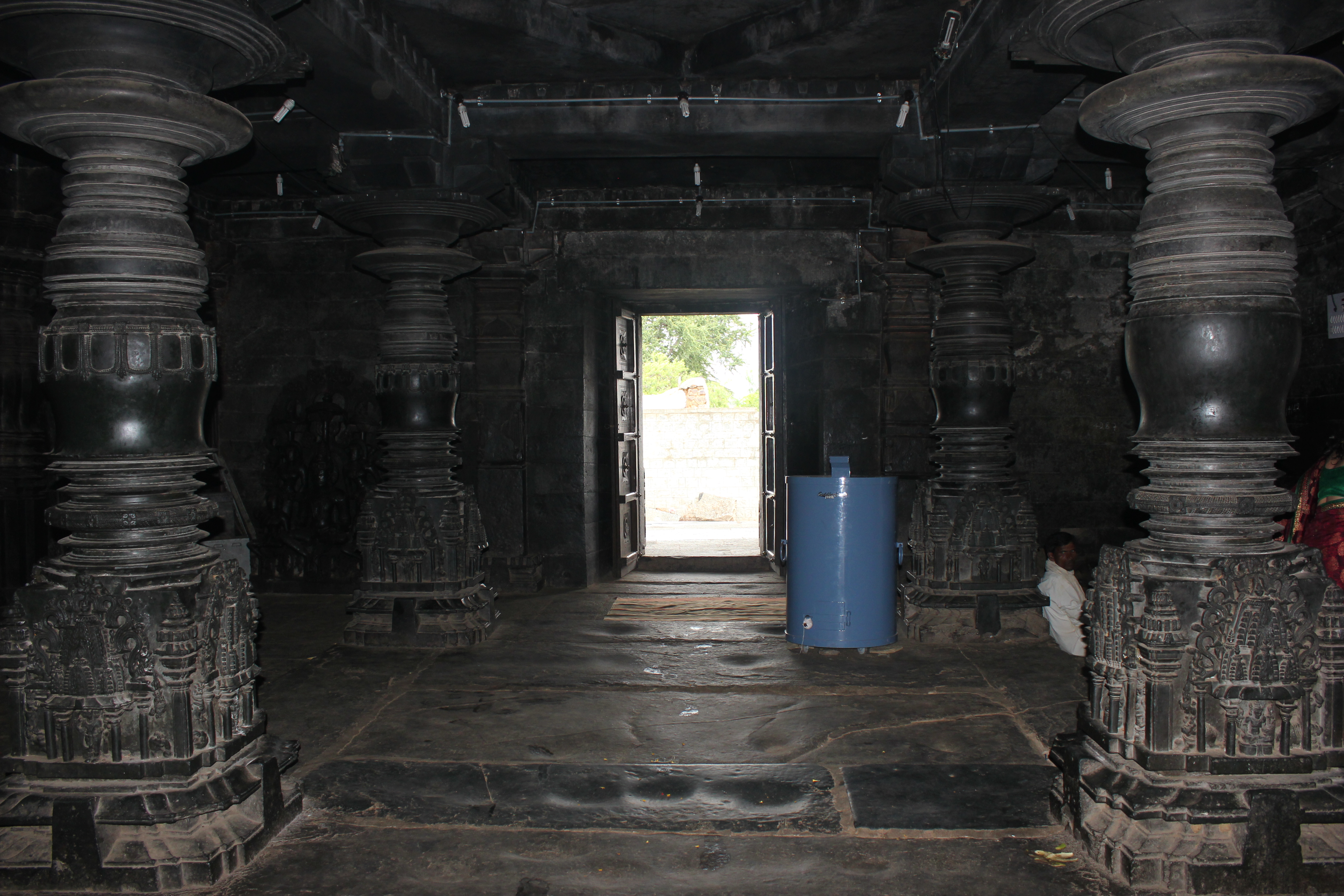
Pillared mantapa in Mallikarjuna temple at Kuruvatti

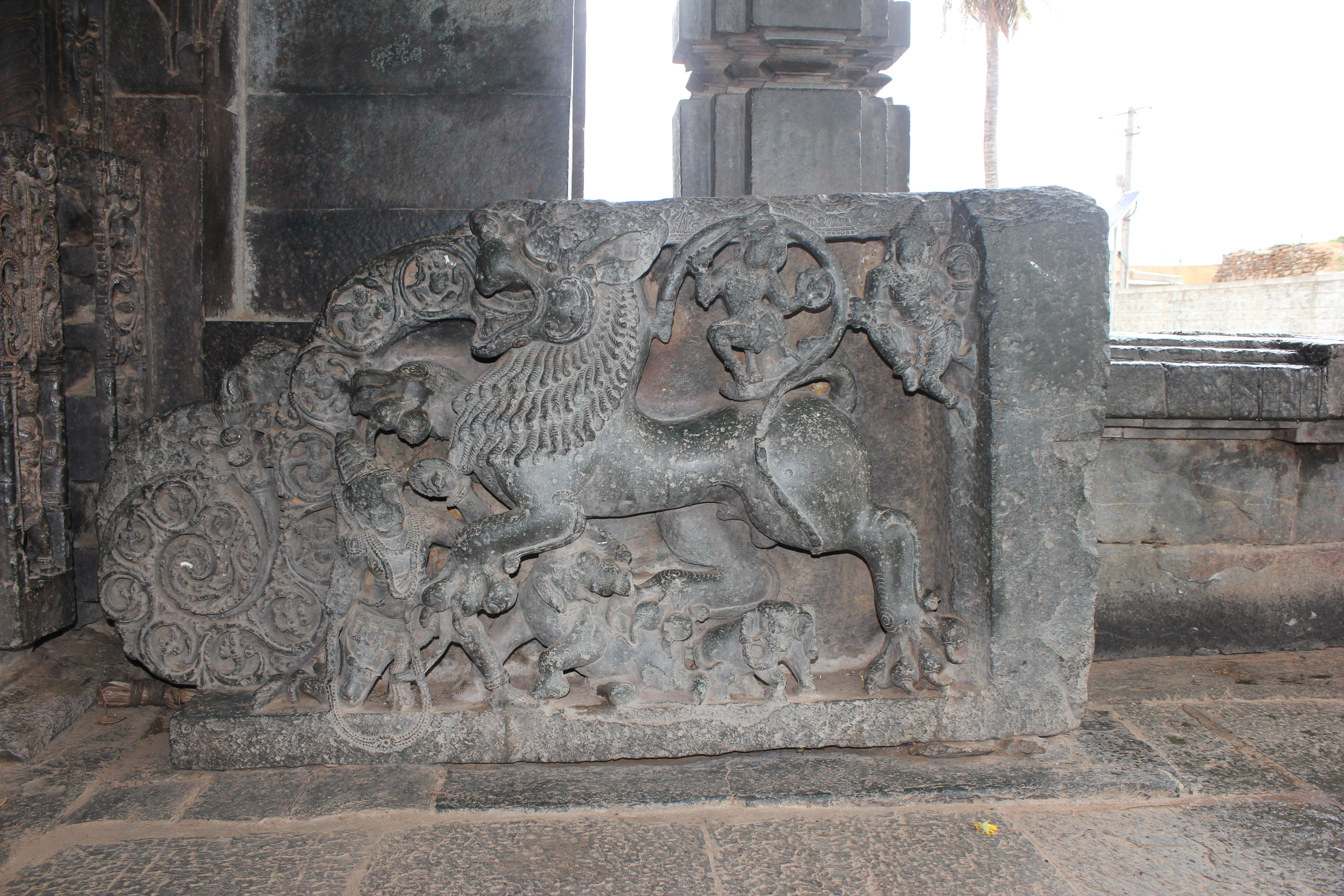
Yali balustrade on a porch in Mallikarjuna temple at Kuruvatti

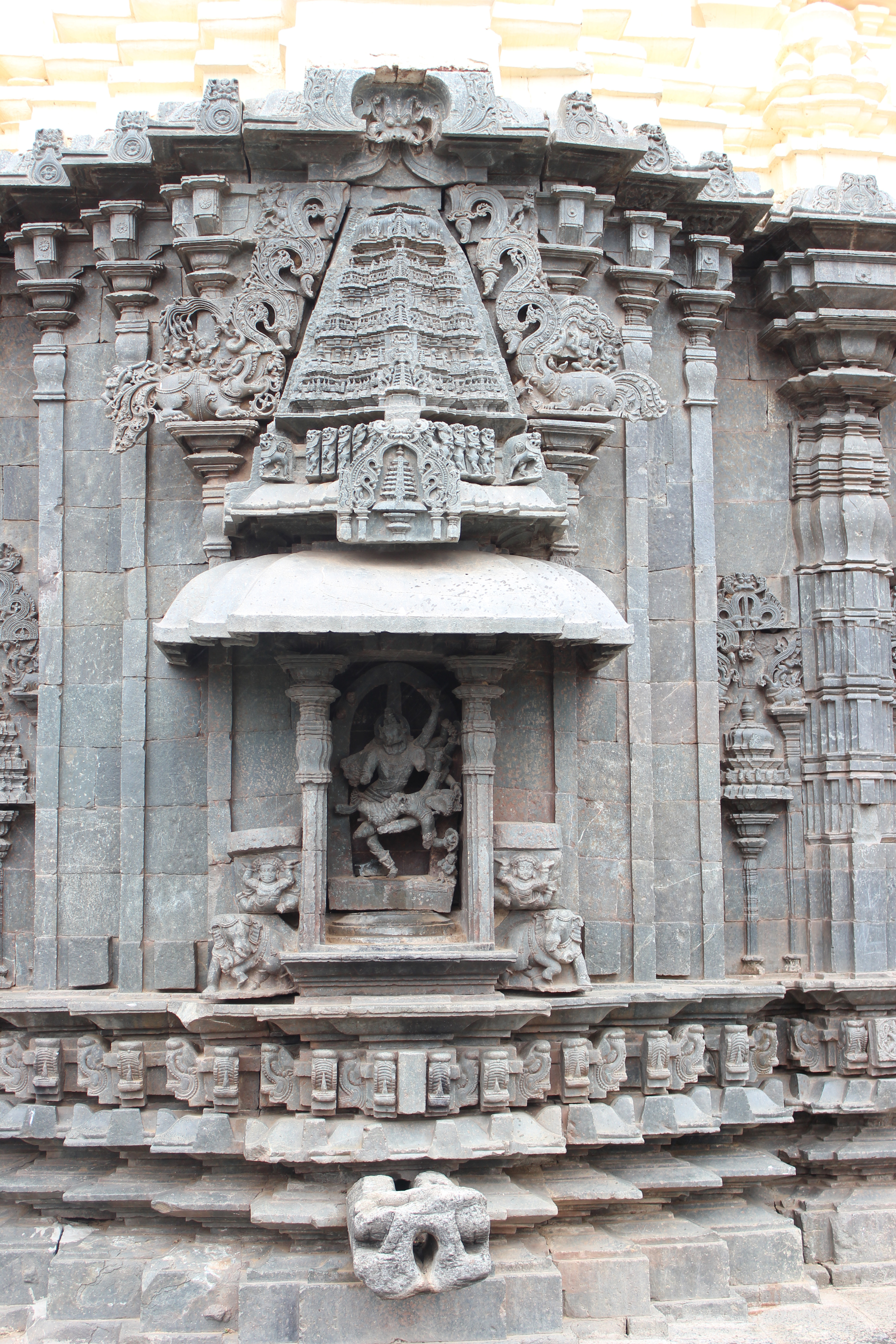
Shrine wall relief, molding frieze and miniature decorative tower in Mallikarjuna temple at Kuruvatti

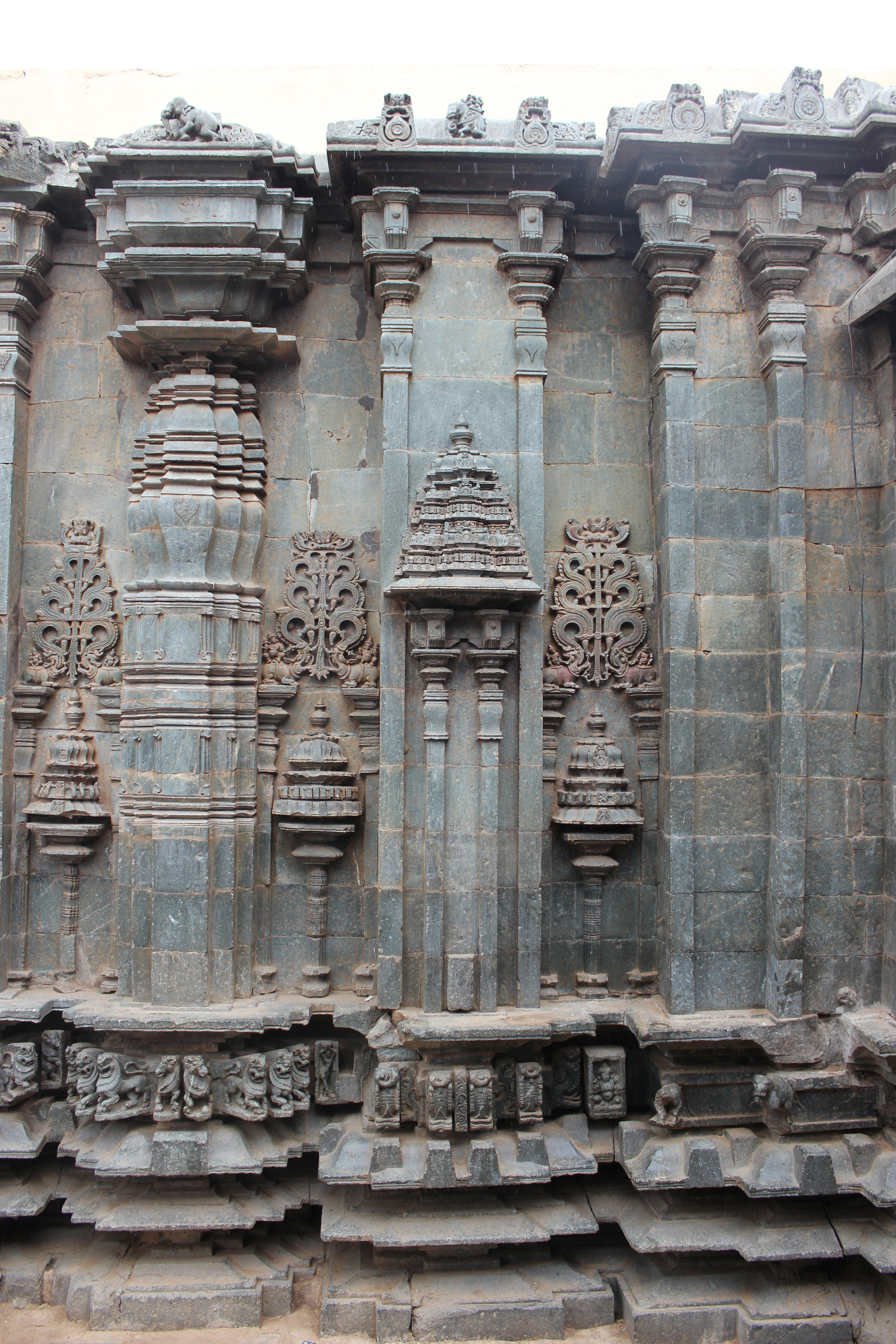
Wall relief, turret, pilasters with miniature decorative towers in Mallikarjuna temple at Kuruvatti

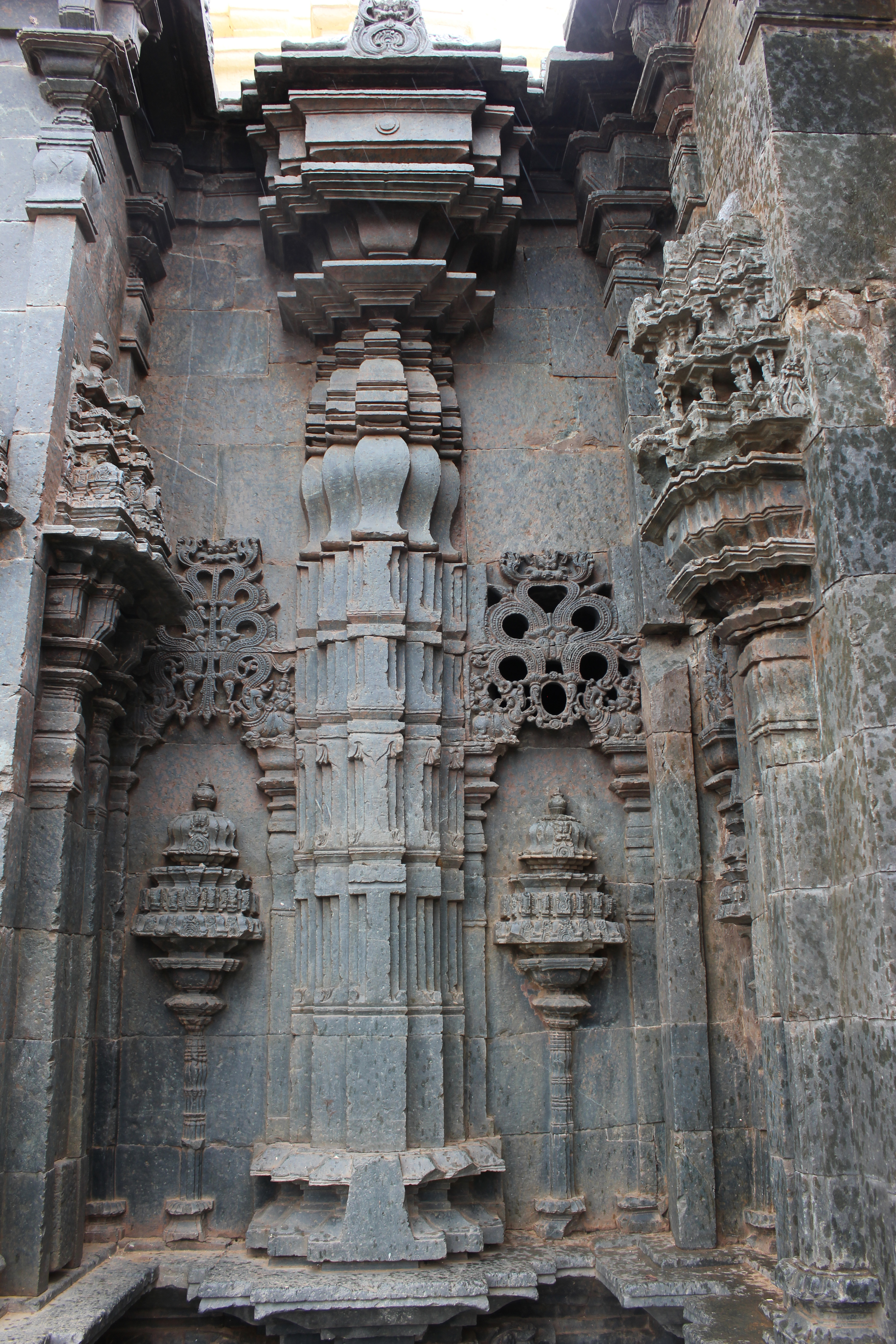
Wall relief, turret, pilasters with miniature decorative towers in Mallikarjuna temple at Kuruvatti

== See also ==
- Basaveshwara temple, Kuruvathi
- Mallikarjuna Temple, Basaralu
