= Tubaki Krishnappa Nayak =

Tupakula Krishnappa Nayaka
- Nayak of Gingee
- Reign: 1509-1521
- Predecessor: Position established
- Successor: Achutha Ramachandra Nayak
- Dynasty: Nayaks of Gingee
- Religion: Hindu

Tupakula/Tubaki Krishnappa Nayak was an army commander in service of the Vijayanagar emperor, Krishna Deva Raya. He hailed from the Chandragiri family of Balija caste. He served as the first Nayak or Viceroy of Gingee from 1509 to 1521.

== Early life ==
The Varadambika Parinayam states that in 1509, Krishna Deva Raya sent an army of over 100,000 men headed by generals Vaiyappa Nayak, Tubaki Krishnappa Nayak, Vijayaraghava Nayak and Venkatappa Nayak into the south to conquer the whole of the present-day Tamil Nadu. On successful subjugation of the Chola and Pandya kingdoms, Krishna Deva Raya divided the region into three governorates and placed each of them under a Nayak or viceroy - Madurai, Thanjavur and Gingee. Krishnappa Nayak was made the Nayak of Gingee.

== Reign ==
Krishnappa Nayak reigned from 1509 to 1521. On the whole, his reign was peaceful and he was able to devote his time to construction activity. Tubaki Krishnappa Nayak and Vaiyappa Nayak are credited with having constructed temples at Srimushanam and Thirukkoilur. Krishnappa Nayak is also credited with the construction of the granaries in the Gingee Fort, the Kalyana Mahal and the walls surrounding the three Gingee hills. A number of small townships and villages emerged during his reign.

During his reign, Krishnappa Nayak controlled a territory spanning from Nellore to the Kollidam (Coleroon) River.

== Death ==
Krishnappa Nayak died in 1521 and was succeeded by Achutha Ramachandra Nayak.
