= Vaduga =

Telugu speaking castes based communities from Tamil Nadu, India

The Vaduga or Vadugar comprise three distinct Telugu caste-based communities found in present-day Tamil Nadu, India. Their caste identities are as Kammavars, Balijas, and Kambalathars. Emerging as a dominant socio political force during the Vijayanagara Empire, they transitioned from imperial military commanders to independent rulers known as Nayakas. Following the collapse of the central Vijayanagara authority in 1565, these communities established powerful dynasties in Madurai, Thanjavur, Vellore and Senji, fundamentally shaping the administrative, cultural, and architectural landscape of the Tamil country for over two centuries.

== Etymology ==
The term Vadugar is derived from the Tamil word Vadu (North), literally translating to "Northerners."

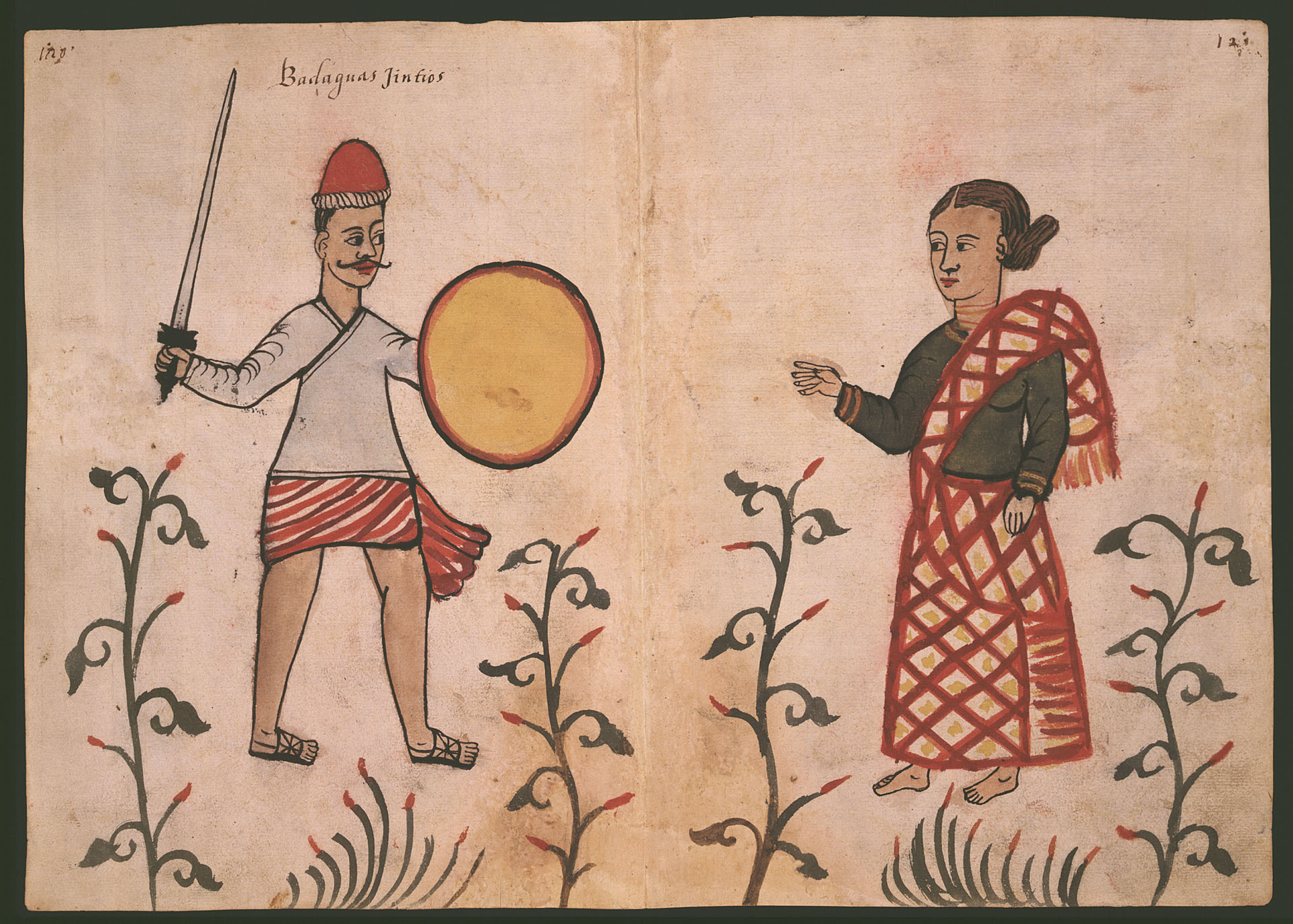
, who inhabited the southeastern coast of India

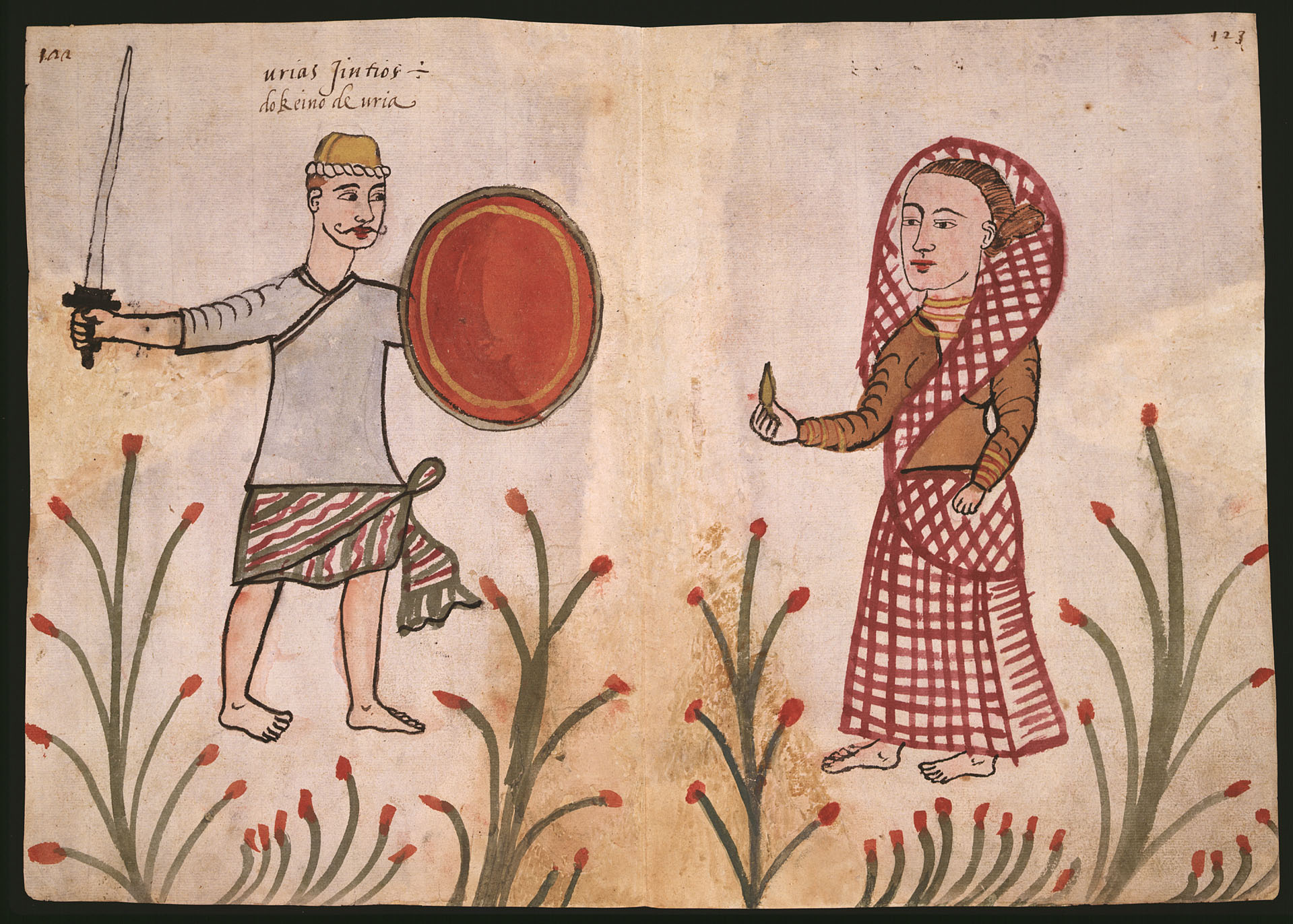
People from Orissa, in the eastern coast of India

== Subgroups ==
Some subgroups of Vaduga include Ekambathia, Jagathar, Kambi Kattu, Kokudi, Koyilu, Kuliri Kolar, Kunti, Kuthir, Minkara, Mungai, Panayagar, Pasha Korava, Pattanavan, and Toli.

== History ==
The term Vadugar was used initially to refer to the people occupying the regions north of Tamil Nadu. In Sangam literature it was applied to the chief of Erumainadu (roughly Southern Karnataka) and to the people of Vengadam (the regions around Tirupati). Sekkiliar used the term "Vaduka Karunadar Mannan" to refer to the Kalabhra invaders of Madurai in Periya Puranam. The Hoysalas invasions were called "Periya Vadukan Kalaham" in inscriptions. Badaga is derived from Vaduga. Therefore historians believe the term was initially used to refer to Kannadigas. However it was largely used to refer to Telugu people later.

== Notable people ==
Historical figures such as Veerapandiya Kattabomman, Tirumala Nayaka, Maharaani Mangammal, and Virupatchi Gopala Naicker were prominent leaders and rulers of the Vaduga Nayaka kingdoms in Tamil Nadu.
