= Era Krishnappa Nayak =

Nayak of Belur from 1524 to 1566

Nayak of Belur
- Reign: 1524–1566
- Successor: Venkatadri Nayak
- Dynasty: Nayaks of Belur
- Father: Pottappa Nayaka
- Religion: Hindu

Era Krishnappa Nayak was the king of Belur. He reigned from 1524 to 1566. He ruled Hassan and Kodagu region.

== Family background ==
Era Krishnappa Nayaka belonged to the Telugu-speaking Balija caste. He was the son of Pottappa Nayaka, his grand father Timmappa Nayak and great-grandfather of Giriyappa Nayak. His brother Surappa Nayaka, ruled gingee region.

== Service under Sri Krishna Deva Raya ==
He served as the Tambula Karandavahin (lit. 'betel-bearer') to Krishnadevaraya. Era Krishappa Nayak was then succeeded by his son Venkatadri Nayaka.
