= Siege of Belur =

- Part of Deccani–Vijayanagar wars
| Date | 1659 |
| Location | Belur, Karnataka, India 13.166°N 75.865°E |
| Result | Vijayanagara-Keladi victory |

Belligerents
| Vijayanagar Empire: Keladi Nayakas | Belur Nayaks; Supported by: Kingdom of Mysore |

Commanders and leaders
| Sriranga III; Shivappa Nayaka | Krishnappa Nayaka; Venkatadri Nayaka (POW); Kanthirava Narasaraja I |

Strength
| 40,000–50,000 | Unknown |
- Location within South Asia

The Siege of Belur was a military conflict fought in the year 1659 during the final years of the Vijayanagara Empire. in support of Emperor Sriranga III, Shivappa Nayaka of Keladi laid siege to Belur, which was defended by Krishnappa Nayaka and supported by Kingdom of Mysore under Kanthirava Narasaraja I. After defeating the defending forces and capturing Venkatadri Nayaka, Shivappa secured Belur and restored Sriranga III's authority in the region. The victory strengthened the emperor's position and limited the expansion of Kingdom of Mysore's influence in western Karnataka.

== Background ==
Around 1656, Emperor Sriranga III was once again abandoned by several of his vassals, including the Nayaks of Madurai, Thanjavur and Gingee. Forced to flee, he sought refuge in the forests along the borders of his kingdom, where he reportedly lived in difficult conditions. However, Shivappa Nayaka of Ikkeri remained loyal to the emperor and offered him protection and asylum. Between 1656 and 1659, Sriranga III appears to have resided at Bednur after a period of stay in Mysore. During this time, Shivappa Nayaka is said to have granted him the governorships of Sakrepatna and Vasudhare.

== Siege ==
According to the Sivatattvaratnakara, Shivappa Nayaka led military campaigns in support of Emperor Sriranga III after the emperor was driven from Velapura. Shivappa Nayaka marched to the town, established a camp near the fort, constructed defensive works, and placed the fortress under siege. The fort eventually surrendered after a blockade and heavy fighting.

In recognition of his services, Sriranga III bestowed several honors upon Shivappa Nayaka including the title Ramabana Paravaranavarana. He also presented him with valuable gifts such as a costly ear ornament, the emblems of the conch and discus, and a ceremonial umbrella known as Jagajhampa (World Leap). Shivappa Nayaka accepted these gifts from his overlord despite the emperor's greatly diminished political authority.

The Velapura mentioned in the Sivatattvaratnakara is generally identified with Belur in present-day Hassan district, as Velapura is the Sanskritized form of Belur. This interpretation differs from the earlier view of several historians who identified the location as Vellore in present-day Tamil Nadu.

Belur, known in inscriptions by its earlier name Velapura, is generally considered the location referred to in the Sivatattvaratnakara. Vellore had already been lost by Sriranga III in 1647 and again in 1654, making it unlikely that Shivappa Nayaka could have attempted to recover such a distant fortress. Belur had been under Bijapur Sultanate's control since 1640 and was located much closer to the Ikkeri kingdom making it a more plausible target for a campaign undertaken on behalf of the emperor.

The capture of Belur was not achieved without resistance. Krishnappa Nayaka of Belur and Arkalgud opposed Shivappa Nayaka with a large army. He also received significant support from Kanthirava Narasaraja I of Mysore, whose feudatory Krishnappa Nayaka was. Shivappa Nayaka decisively defeated Krishnappa Nayaka in battle and captured his son, Venkatadri Nayaka as a prisoner.

== Aftermath ==
The conquest of Belur was an important achievement for Shivappa Nayaka. It checked the advance of Mysore's influence in the northwestern parts of Karnataka and helped improve the position of Emperor Sriranga III. By 1659, Sriranga appears to have been restored at Hassan and Belur as inscriptions from that year mention his rule at Belur.

The Keladinripavijayam and the Sivatattvaratnakara present Shivappa Nayaka's intervention as an act of loyalty to the Vijayanagara Emperor. However, political considerations may also have played a role. By supporting Sriranga III and restoring some of his authority, Shivappa Nayaka strengthened his own standing and gained a useful ally against Mysore. His actions not only aided the emperor but also furthered his long-standing conflict with the Mysore Kingdom.

== See also ==
- Tirumala Nayaka
- Vijaya Raghava Nayak
- Kalahasti Nayaks
