= List of Dakshina Kasis =

There is one Kasi in the entire world and many Dakshina Kashis, per regional legends.

- Basaveshwara temple, Kuruvathi
- Bugga Ramalingeswara swamy, Tadipatri
- Srimukhalingam, Srikakulam, Andhrapradesh
- Draksharama
- Gavi Gangadhareshwara Temple, Bangalore
- Harihareshwara Temple, Harihar
- Kalakaleshwara temple, Gajendragad
- Jogulamba Temple, Alampur
- Oachira Temple, Oachira
- Prakasha, Maharashtra
- Raja Rajeshawara Temple, Vemulawada, Telangana.
- Shivagange
- Shree Jyotiba, Maharashtra
- Siddhavattam, Cuddapah
- Sree Mahadeva Temple, Kandiyoor
- Srikanteshwara Temple
- Terumalleshwara Temple, Hiriyur
- Trikkannad Shiva Temple, Kasaragod
- Uppinangadi
- Veerabhadra swamy temple, Rayachoti
- Viswanatha Swamy Temple, Palakkad
