= Achutha Ramachandra Nayak =

Achutha Ramachandra Nayak ruled over the Gingee Nayak kingdom from 1520 to 1540. He constructed the fortified walls enclosing the Tiruvannamalai temple and the temple gopura. Towards the end of his reign, Ramachandra constructed the Vishnu temple at Tindivanam, and the gopura of Nedungunram and Chetpat temples. Ramachandra also endowed a number of agraharas.
