= Balija =

Indian caste

- Religions: Hinduism
- Languages: Telugu, Kannada, Tamil
- Country: India
- Populated states: Andhra Pradesh, Tamil Nadu, Karnataka, Telangana, Kerala

The Balija are a Telugu-speaking mercantile community primarily living in the Indian states of Andhra Pradesh, Tamil Nadu, Karnataka and in smaller numbers in Telangana and Kerala. In Tamil Nadu, they are known as Gavarais.

== Etymology ==
Variations of the name in use in the medieval era were Balanja, Bananja, Bananju, Banajiga and Banijiga, with probable cognates Balijiga, Valanjiyar, Balanji, Bananji and derivatives such as Baliga, all of which are said to be derived from the Sanskrit term Vanik or Vanij, for trader.

Another version for etymology states that Balija is derived from the Sanskrit word Bali, a sacrifice made during 'Yagna' ritual and Ja meaning born. Therefore, Balija means 'born from sacrifice'.

== Origins ==
Beginning in the 9th century, references are found in inscriptions throughout the Kannada and Tamil areas to a trading network, which is sometimes referred to as a guild, called the Five Hundred Lords of Ayyavolu that provided trade links between trading communities in Tamil Nadu and Karnataka. From the 13th century, inscriptions referring to "Vira Balanjyas" (warrior merchants) started appearing in the Andhra country. The Vira Balanjyas, whose origins are often claimed to lie in the Ayyavolu, represented long-distance trading networks that employed fighters to protect their warehouses and goods in transit. The traders were identified as nanadesi (of 'many countries') and as swadesi ('own country'). The terms balanjya-setti and balija were also used for these traders, and in later times naidu and chetti. These traders formed collectives called pekkandru and differentiated themselves from other collectives called nagaram, which probably represented Komati merchants. The pekkandru collectives also included members of other communities with status titles reddi, boya and nayaka. They spread all over South India, Sri Lanka, and also some countries in the Southeast Asia.

== Medieval history ==
=== Chalukya period ===
The earliest inscriptions mentioning the Balija community are from the Western Chalukya period, specifically during the reign of King Someshvara I and are found in the Shimoga region of present-day Karnataka.

=== Kakatiya period ===
The Balija community is mentioned in Kakatiya inscriptions, particularly during the reign of King Prataparudra II and are found in the Nandyal region of present-day Andhra Pradesh. According to Prataparudra charitra and Siddheswara charitra mentioned that the balijas lived at Orugallu, the capital of the Kakatiya kingdom.

=== Post-Kakatiya period ===
In the caste-based hierarchy, Balijas hold a high position along with Kammas, Reddis and Velamas. they also served as military generals (Nayakas) and warriors under the Musunuri Nayakas and Kondavidu kingdom.

=== Vijayanagara period ===
Balijas served as ministers, military generals, and provincial governors in the Vijayanagara Empire. A number of the Nayaka dynasties of the Vijayanagara and post-Vijayanagara periods were of Balija origin, including the Nayaka rulers of Madurai, Thanjavur, Gingee, Belur, Channapatna, Rayadurgam and Kandy.

Velcheru Narayana Rao et al. note that the Balijas were first mobilised politically by the Vijayanagara emperor Krishnadevaraya. Later, in the 15th and 16th centuries, they colonised the Tamil country and established Nayaka chieftaincies. At this time, Balijas were leaders of the left-hand section of castes. These Balija warriors were noted as fearless and some stories speak of them assassinating kings who interfered with their affairs. Cynthia Talbot believes that in Andhra the transformation of occupational descriptors into caste-based descriptors did not occur until at least the 17th century.

=== British period ===
The classification of people as Balija was one of many challenges for the census enumerators of the British Raj era, whose desire was to reduce a complex social system to one of administrative simplicity using theories of evolutionary anthropology. (Note: The Raj theories of evolutionary anthropology, typified by the work of H. H. Risley, are nowadays considered to be scientific racism.) Early Raj census attempts in Madras Presidency recorded a wide variety of people claiming to be members of Balija subcastes but who appeared to share little in common and thus defied the administrative desire for what it considered to be a rational and convenient taxonomy. Those who claimed to be Chetty had an obvious connection through their engagement in trade and those who called themselves Kavarai were simply using the Tamil word for Balija but, for example, the Linga Balija based their claim to Balija status on a sectarian identification, the Gazula were bangle-makers by occupation, the Telaga had Telugu origins and the Rajamahendram also appeared to be a geographic claim based on their origins in the town of Rajahmundry. Subsequent attempts to rationalise the enumeration merely created other anomalies and caused upset.

== Geographical distribution ==
Balijas are found in Rayalaseema region of Andhra Pradesh. In Tamilnadu, Balijas are known as Gavarais. The often use the titles Naidu, Naicker and Chettiar. In Karnataka, they have four sub-sects based on occupations and territories, namely Dasa Balija, Gajula Balija, Dundi Balija and Goni Balija. While Telugu is their mother tongue, they also speak Kannada.

== Balija branches ==
- Balija Chettis (or Chetti Balija): Mentioned in several Vijayanagar accounts as wealthy merchants who controlled powerful trading guilds. To secure their loyalty, the Vijayanagar kings made them Desais or "superintendents of all castes in the country." They were classified as right-hand castes. David Rudner claims that the Balija Chettis became a separate caste from the Balija Nayak warriors as recent as the 19th century; and accordingly they have closer kinship ties to the Nayak warriors than to Chetti merchants.
- Gavara is a trading community and is a sub-caste of Balija. They have marriage relationship with the Balijas. Kavarai is the Tamil name for Balijas who have settled in Tamil Nadu and is the Tamilised rendition of Gavara. The often use the title Naidu and Chetti.
- 24 Manai Telugu Chettiar are also called as Janappan. They seem to be a section of the Balijas, though now they are considered to be a distinct caste. They are also called Sadhu Chetty and Saluppa Chetty.
- Dasa Banajiga are also called as Jaina Kshatriya Ramanuja-Dasa Vaniyas and Sadu Banajiga as they were formerly Jain Kshatriyas who were converted to Vaishnavism by Ramanujacharya during the reign of Bitti Deva. They are mostly found in Channapatna near Bangalore. They are clean in their habits, pure vegetarians, follow the doctrines of Ramanujacharya, worship Vaishnava gods, speak Kannada, and cremate their dead.

== Relation to Kapu ==
Kapus are closely related to Balijas and both are often enumerated together in government, sociological and psephological contexts. Sri Andhra Vignanamu mentions four sections in Telaga community — Telagas (or Naidus), Ontaris (or Doras), Balijas, and Kapus. Anthropological Survey of India notes that Kapus of Coastal Andhra are ethnically similar to Balijas of Rayalaseema.

Various sources note the similarities between the communities of Kapu, Telaga, Balija, and Ontari. These terms are often used as synonyms and are mentioned as sections of each other. Kapu, Telaga, and Balija are considered as variant names of the same community in different regions. Andhra Pradesh government's Kapu Welfare and Development Corporation refers to Kapu, Telaga, Balija, and Ontari communities collectively as Kapu.

== Caste titles ==
Some Balijas use surnames such as Naidu or Nayudu, and Naicker, which share a common root. Nayaka as a term was first used during the Vishnukundina dynasty that ruled from the Krishna and Godavari deltas during the 3rd century AD. During the Kakatiya dynasty, the Nayaka title was bestowed to warriors who had received land and the title as a part of the Nayankarapuvaram system for services rendered to the court. The Nayaka was noted to be an officer in the Kakatiya court; there being a correlation between holding the Nayankara, the possession of the administrative title Angaraksha and the status title Nayaka.

A more widespread usage of the Nayaka title amongst the Balijas appears to have happened during the Vijayanagara empire where the Balija merchant-warriors rose to political and cultural power and claimed Nayaka positions.

== Dynasties ==
The Vijayanagara empire was based on an expanding, cash-oriented economy enhanced by Balija tax-farming. Some Balija families were appointed to supervise provinces as Nayaks (governors, commanders) by the Vijayanagara kings, some of which are:

- Madurai Nayaks
- Tanjavur Nayaks
- Gingee Nayaks / Senji Nayaks
- Belur Nayaks / Balam Nayaks
- Kandy Nayaks. who ruled Sri Lanka
- Penukonda Nayaks / Rayadurga Nayaks
- Channapatna Nayaks / Baramahal Nayaks

== Varna status ==
Velcheru Narayana Rao and Sanjay Subrahmanyam say that the emergence of left-hand caste Balijas as trader-warrior-kings in the Nayaka period is a consequence of conditions of new wealth produced by collapsing two varnas, Kshatriya and Vaishya, into one. Based on the Brahmanical conceptualisation of caste during the British Raj period, Balijas were accorded the Sat Shudra position. The fourfold Brahmanical varna concept has not been acceptable to non-Brahmin social groups and some of them challenged the authority of Brahmins who described them as Shudras.

== Notable people ==
Note: The list only includes people from Balija and sub-castes (Gavara, Gazula), not Kapu, Telaga, and other castes.

Warriors

- Viswanatha Nayak - Founder of the Madurai Nayak dynasty.
- Sevappa Nayak - Founder of the Thanjavur Nayak dynasty
- Tupakula Krishnappa Nayak - Founder of the Gingee Nayak dynasty
- Sri Vijaya Rajasinha - Founder of the Kandy Nayak dynasty
- Mangammal - Queen of Madurai
- Tirumala Nayak - King of Madurai.
- Era Krishnappa Nayaka, King of Belur
- Raghunatha Nayak - King of Thanjavur.
- Pedda Koneti Nayak, King of Penukonda
- Rana Jagadevaraya - King of Channapatna

Royal descent

- Social reformer Pattukkottai Alagiri was a descendant of the Royal Family of Kandy.
- Sankariah Naidu, Zamindar of Chennappa Naicken Palayam was a descendant of Tupakula Krishnappa Nayak, the ruler of the Gingee.
- Ramabadra Naidu, Zamindar of Vadagarai was a descendant of the famous warrior and diplomat Ramabhadra Nayak, who had held the post of Military Chief and Collector of Revenue under his close relative Viswanatha Nayak, the ruler of Madurai.

Social Activists

- Periyar E. V. Ramasamy, social reformer
- Padmaja Naidu, freedom fighter
- P. Varadarajulu Naidu, freedom fighter
- Kanneganti Hanumanthu, freedom fighter
- Gazulu Lakshminarasu Chetty, freedom fighter

Spiritual

- Jaggi Vasudev, Indian yoga guru

Film

- M. R. Radha, actor
- Vijayakanth, actor and politician
- Radhika, actress and producer
- Dhanush, actor and director
- Sneha, actress
- Mann Vasanai Pandiyan, actor
- Darshan, actor

Sports

- M. Buchi Babu Naidu, Father of Madras Cricket.
- Dinesh Karthik, cricketer

== See also ==
- Five Hundred Lords of Ayyavolu
