= S. Nijalingappa =

Indian politician (1902–2000)

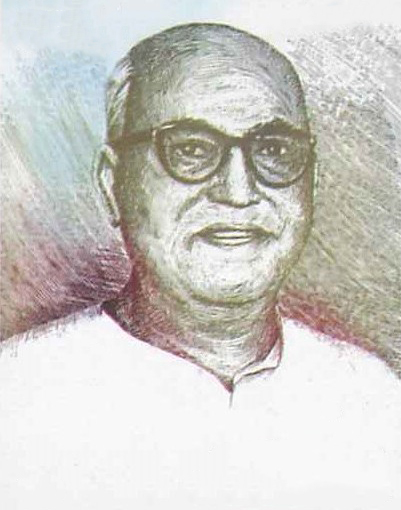

1st Chief Minister of Mysore State
- In office 21 June 1962 – 29 May 1968
- Preceded by: S. R. Kanthi
- Succeeded by: Veerendra Patil
- In office 1 November 1956 – 16 May 1958
- Preceded by: Kadidal Manjappa
- Succeeded by: B. D. Jatti

Personal details
- Born: 10 December 1902 Halavagalu, Madras Presidency, British India (now in Vijayanagara district, Karnataka, India)
- Died: 8 August 2000 (aged 97) Chitradurga, Karnataka, India
- Party: Indian National Congress
- Education: Central College of Bangalore, ILS Law College

Siddavanahalli Nijalingappa (10 December 1902 – 8 August 2000) was an Indian Congress Party politician, lawyer, and Indian independence activist. He was the fourth Chief Minister of Mysore State (now Karnataka), serving two terms (1956–1958 and 1962–1968). In addition to the Indian independence movement, he played an important role in the Karnataka Unification movement.

== Early life and education ==
Nijalingappa was born on 10 December 1902 to a middle-class family in Haluvagalu, a village in the Bellary district of the Madras Presidency. Nijalingappa’s father, who was a small businessman, died when he was five years old, while his mother was a homemaker. His family belonged to the Banajiga Lingayat community, and Nijalingappa’s mother was a devotee of Shiva. Nijalingappa later recalled that his "father's ancestors were all rich profligates" and that they "dissipated their wealth on gambling, drinking and womanising. He added that his maternal grandfather helped his parents, but the still family remained very poor.

He grew up in Davanagere and, as a child, received a traditional education from Veerappa Master, an elder teacher. He later attended a formal Western-style primary school in Davanagere, followed by a secondary school in Chitradurga in 1919. During this period, he became interested in politics after reading the works of Annie Besant. In 1924, he graduated with a degree in Arts from Central College, Bengaluru, and obtained a law degree from the Indian Law Society's Law College, Pune, in 1926.

Like many other leaders of the Indian independence movement, he received both traditional Indian and Western-style education. Influenced by the ideologies of Mahatma Gandhi and Rajendra Prasad, he began to take an active role in the freedom movement in Karnataka.

== Political career ==
Nijalingappa attended Indian National Congress sessions as a spectator. In 1936, when he came into contact with N. S. Hardikar, he took an active interest in the organization. He served first as a volunteer, later becoming president of the Pradesh Congress Committee, and then, in 1968, president of the All India Congress Committee.

He became president of the Mysore Congress and was also a member of the historic Constituent Assembly, from 1946 to 1950. In 1952, he was elected to the First Lok Sabha from the Chitradurga constituency (now Chitradurga), then in Mysore state.

In recognition of his service towards the unification of Karnataka, Nijalingappa was chosen as the first Chief Minister of the unified state. He was re-elected to the same post and continued in that position until April 1968. In Karnataka, he worked on the development of agricultural, irrigation, industrial, and transport projects.

When people expressed their distrust in the party in the 1967 elections, Nijalingappa became Congress President. He chaired two Congress sessions in 1968 and 1969 in Hyderabad and Faridabad, respectively. During this time, the factional feud within the party increased and finally resulted in the historic split of the party in 1969. He was the last president of an undivided Indian National Congress, as the party was then divided into Congress (Organization), which consisted of senior leaders like Nijalingappa, Neelam Sanjiva Reddy, K. Kamaraj, and Morarji Desai; and Congress (R), which supported Indira Gandhi.

After the Congress split, Nijalingappa gradually retired from politics. He later served as chairman of the Sardar Vallabhbhai Patel Society.

=== Posts held ===
- 1936–1940: president of Chitaldroog District Congress Committee
- 1937–1938: member of the Mysore Legislative Council
- 1938–1950: member of the Mysore Congress Working Committee
- 1942–1945: general secretary of the Mysore Pradesh Congress Committee (PCC)
- 1945–1946: president of the Mysore PCC
- 1946: president of the Karnataka PCC
- member of the Constituent Assembly of India and Provisional Parliament
- 1948–1950: member and president of the Constituent Assembly of Mysore
- 1949: member of the Congress Working Committee
- member of the Gopal Rao Enquiry Committee, Government of Mysore

== Death and legacy ==
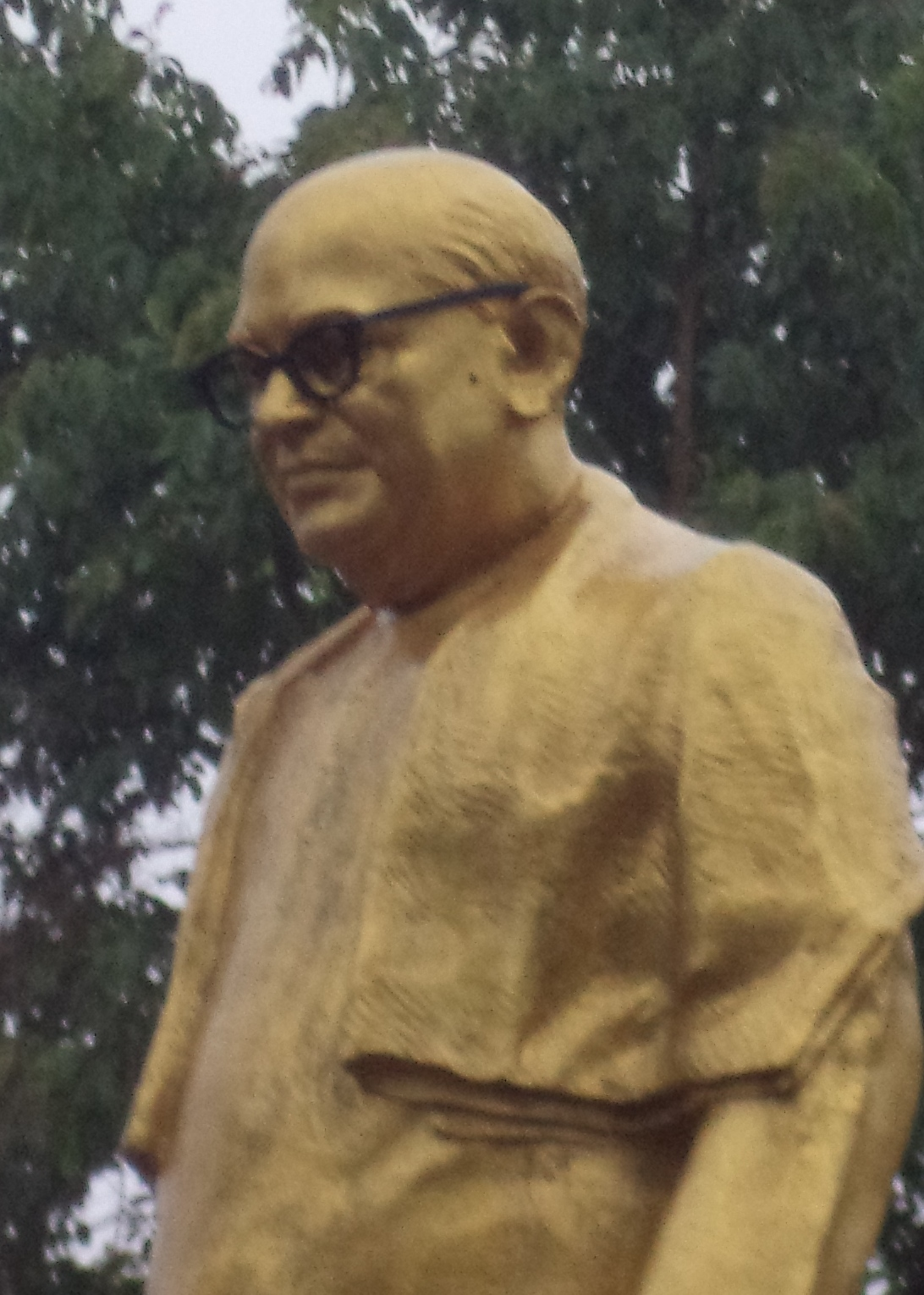
Statue of Nijaligappa in Davanagere

Nijalingappa died on 9 August 2000 at his residence in Chitradurga at the age of 97.

In 1963, Nijalingappa as Chief Minister, decided to establish UAS along the lines of Land Grant College system of USA and passed the University of Agricultural Sciences Bill (Act No. 22). He granted 1300 acres to Gandhi Krishi Vignana Kendra Campus.

Nijalingappa was widely revered, even after his retirement, and was known for his simplicity and integrity. He is remembered fondly by the Tibetan community of India because as Chief Minister of Karnataka he gave land to Tibetan refugees for the purpose of resettlement. Now, Karnataka has the largest Tibetan settlements and the largest population in exile, with the four Tibetan settlements of Bylakuppe, Mundgod, Kollegal, and Gurupura (near Bylakuppe) in Karnataka.

In 2003, a stamp honouring Nijalingappa was issued. A memorial of Nijalingappa was built beside NH-4 on the outskirts of Chitradurga; it was inaugurated by the Dalai Lama on 29 January 2011. Karnataka chief minister B. S. Yeddyurappa declared that he would name the sugar research institute in Belgaum after Nijalingappa.

Political offices
Preceded by Kadidal Manjappa	Chief Minister of Karnataka; 1 November 1956 to 16 May 1958	Succeeded by B. D. Jatti
Preceded by S. R. Kanthi	Chief Minister of Karnataka; 21 June 1962 to 29 May 1968	Succeeded by Veerendra Patil
