= 24 Manai Telugu Chettiars =

Social group in India

24 Manai Telugu Chettiar (24MTC)
- Religions: Hinduism
- Languages: Tamil Telugu
- Country: India
- Populated states: Andhra Pradesh, Karnataka, Kerala, Tamil Nadu, Telangana

The 24 Manai Telugu Chettiar (24MTC) also called as Telugu Chetty is a community who are predominantly found in the states of Tamil Nadu, Andhra Pradesh, Gujarat, Karnataka, Kerala, Telangana in India, as well as Sri Lanka.

== Origin, Etymology and history ==
They were a section of Balija community that later developed into a distinct one. They usually speak Telugu. In North Arcot district they are called Telugu Chettis (Chetti). They have 24 gotras. They, along with many other Telugu communities have been documented to have migrated into Tamil Nadu during the period of the Vijayanagara Empire.

Regarding their gothras the book "Balija Vamsethihasamu" (1951) by Alanduru Rajamannaru Nayudu describes:

It describes them under the title "Shetti Balija Vari Aadi Charitra" (The Origin History of Shetti Balijas) on Page 166, and explicitly refers to them as the "24 Gurindlavaru" (The people of the 24 Clans/Houses).

Here is the summary about the 24 MTC (Shetti Balija) history:

1. The "24 Clan" Origin Story The book recounts a mythological origin for the 24 clans:

The Parents: It traces the lineage to a king named Pruthvisu and his wife Sujanabha.

The 24 Sons: They performed a Putrakameshti Yaga (sacrifice for children) and were blessed with sons. The book lists the count as 2 Kings + 22 Ministers, totaling 24 leaders. This explains their 24 Manai structure.

It specifically lists a hierarchy born from a Yaga:

2 Kings (Deshadhipathulu): This explains why some clans in the community claim "Raja" or "Desai" status.

22 Ministers (Mantrulu): This explains the structured leadership.

Total = 24: This is the origin of the "24 Manai" (24 Houses) guild structure.

The Book: Irubathu Nanku Manaiyarakiya Desadhipathigal Natakam (1865) (The Drama of the Desadhipathis - The 24 Manaiyar) Author: Thirimurthi Kaviraja Gnana Pandithar describes:

It is a dramatic retelling of the community's history, written nearly 160 years ago.

The "Gothra" Clarification (Crucial Evidence): On Page 7, the book contains a section called "Desadhipathigalin Gothra Bedha Nivarthi" (Clarification of Gothra Differences). It explains why families within the same 24 MTC gothra use different surnames:

It states that the 24 Gothras are the only true ones, but people use different names based on Reason, Symbol, Profession, or Place.

Example 1 (Mummudi Gothra):

By Reason: Thottakarakarar.

By Symbol: Errapogularar.

By Profession: Pillaiyarar.

By Place: Vandavasiyar.

By Quality: Surakarar (Valorous).

Example 2 (Kola Gothra):

By Reason: Thuppakiyar (Gun holders - indicating warrior past).

By Place: Ramagiriyar.

By Quality: Munimuthar.

Significance: This proves that families using names like "Thottakara" or "Ramagiri" are actually part of the core 24 MTC lineages like Mummudi or Kola.

2. The "Kerala & Sea Trade" Connection The book explicitly validates the oral history of sea trade undertaken by the community:

The Order: A Chola king advised them to prepare ships (Odalu) and go to the Malayalam country (Kerala) for trade.

The Event: It states they traveled by the "Southern Sea Route" to trade in Kerala.

3. The "Kamakshi Devi" Connection: The book explains why Kamakshi is the Kula Deivam (Clan Deity) for the community:

The Conflict: While trading, they protected a group of "Kapus" who were being chased by a Pandya King. In the ensuing conflict, the Pandya king beheaded the 24 MTC ancestors.

Their sincere worship and penance to Kamakshi Devi had saved their community from extinction due to this conflict. Therefore Kamakshi became their community deity.

Another Book: Desadhipathi ennum Kuladeivamalai (1912) (The Garland of the Clan Deity Desadhipathi) Author: Chitta Ve. Seshasala Naidu Key Findings: This text focuses on the devotional aspect but provides a strict definition of who the "Chetti Balijas" are.

Definition of the Community: On Page 4, it explicitly categorizes the community under the "Pettai Balija" division (Balijas who lived in trading towns/Pettais outside the fort).

It lists 18 sub-sects including Gajuluvaru (Bangle), Muthyalavaru (Pearl), Rathnavaru (Gem), and specifically "Chetti Balija Varu".

It states: "The Chetti Balija people are the ones who call themselves the 24 Manaiyar".

The book categorizes the 24 Manai Telugu Chettiars (referred to here as Shetti Balija / 24 Gurindlavaru) as a distinct, high-status merchant warrior group within the broader framework.

During the vijayanagar empire, they were bestowed the title of Desayis (Superintendent of all right-hand castes) along with Balija naidus.

== Occupation ==
The 24MTC were involved in trading. The modern day community is predominantly involved in business, industry, and small trade. The total population of 24MTC is around 1 million in Tamil Nadu. As per Hindu Varna System, the community is categorized as Vaishyas (merchants) or Yaga Kshatriyas (Descent from Balijas). They have been listed as a section of Balijas. They are known as Desais (Superintendent of all Right-hand castes).

== Temple administration and patronage ==
Palani Copper Plate Grant (1635 AD) Historical records indicate a significant administrative relationship between the 24 Manai Telugu Chettiar community and the Palani Murugan Temple. A copper plate inscription dated to 1635 AD (Saka Era 1557), issued during the reign of King Thirumalai Nayakkar, records the grant of specific temple honors to the community.

The inscription formally recognizes the community's role in maintaining the Dharma Madalayam (pilgrim choultry) and grants them the hereditary right of Mandagapadi (first ritual honors) during the temple festivals. This grant validates the community's status as influential temple patrons and financiers within the Nayak kingdom's administration.

== Community Sub-divisions or clans ==
Their 24 gotras are further divided into groups of sixteen and eight. Usually marriage is forbidden between members of the same group, but permitted between members of the sixteen and eight gotras.

Among the names of the gōtras as per the historians, are the following: Vasava, Vamme, Mummudi, Pilli Vankaravan, Makkiduvan, Thallelan, Gendagiri, Madalavan, Piligara, Mukkanda, Vadiya, Thonda, Kōla.

Present forms of gotras or clans
16 Veedu: Mummudiyar, Tharishiyavar, Kolavar, Kanithiyavar, Thillaiyavar, Paluvidhiyar, Chennaiyavar, Mathalaiyavar, Kothavangavar, Rajabhairavar, Vammaiyar, Kappavar, Vachiyavar, Kenthiyavar, Naliviraiyavar, Surayavar, Gandavangavalar
8 Veedu: Makkadaiyar, Korahaiyar, Marattaiyar, Kavalaiyar, Pillivangavar, Thavalaiyar, Soppiyar, Kottavar, Nalabakshiyavar
