= S. R. Kanthi =

Indian politician

3rd Chief Minister of Mysore State
- In office 14 March 1962 – 20 June 1962
- Preceded by: Basappa Danappa Jatti
- Succeeded by: S. Nijalingappa

Law Minister of Mysore
- In office 1 March 1967 – 28 May 1968
- Chief Minister: S. Nijalingappa

Parliamentary Affairs Minister of Mysore
- In office 1 March 1967 – 28 May 1968
- Chief Minister: S. Nijalingappa

Education Minister of Mysore
- In office 14 March 1962 – 28 Feb 1967
- Chief Minister: Himself; S. Nijalingappa

4th Speaker of Mysore Legislative Assembly
- In office 19 December 1956 – 9 March 1962
- Chief Minister: S. Nijalingappa; B. D. Jatti
- Preceded by: H. S. Rudrappa
- Succeeded by: Bantwal Vaikunta Baliga

1st Deputy speaker of the Bombay Legislative Assembly
- In office 1 April 1952 – 31 October 1956
- Preceded by: Shanmugappa Ningappa Angadi
- Succeeded by: S. K. Wankhede
- Constituency: Hungund

Member of the Mysore Legislative Assembly
- In office 1 November 1956 – 25 October 1969
- Preceded by: Position Established
- Succeeded by: G. P. Nanjayyanamath
- Constituency: Hungund

Member of the Bombay Legislative Assembly
- In office 1 April 1952 – 31 October 1956
- Preceded by: Position Established
- Succeeded by: Position disestablished
- Constituency: Hungund

Member of the Bombay Legislative Assembly
- In office January 1946 – 26 January 1950
- Preceded by: Position Established
- Succeeded by: Position disestablished
- Constituency: Bijapur South

Personal details
- Born: 21 December 1908 Kerur, Bombay Presidency, British India (now in Karnataka, India)
- Died: 25 October 1969 (aged 60) Kittur, Mysore State, India (now in Karnataka, India)
- Party: Indian National Congress
- Spouse: Maribasamma (m. 1936)
- Education: Shahaji Law College, Kolhapur

Shivalingappa Rudrappa Kanthi (21 December 1908 - 25 October 1969) was the Chief Minister of Karnataka (then, Mysore State) for a brief period in 1962. He hailed from Banajiga community a sub-sect of Lingayatism tradition in Hungund, Bagalkot district (formerly Bijapur district) in the northern part of Karnataka. A member of the Indian National Congress (INC), he served as the Speaker of Karnataka Legislative Assembly from 1956 to 1962. Kanti was Chief Minister of the State for a brief period of 96 days in 1962. Later, as Education Minister in the S. Nijalingappa Cabinet he was instrumental in the establishment of Bangalore University and Kittur Rani Chennamma Sainik Schools.

His centenary celebrations were held in 2008. He belonged to Banajiga sub-sect of Lingayat community.

== See also ==
- List of chief ministers of Karnataka

Preceded by B. D. Jatti	Chief Minister of Karnataka; 14 March 1962 – 20 June 1962	Succeeded by S. Nijalingappa
