= Nayaks of Gingee =

Dynasty of Gingee, India (1509–1649)

Gingee Nayak Kingdom
- 1509–1649
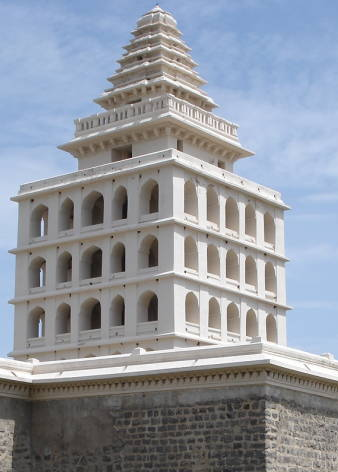
- Capital: Gingee Fort
- Common languages: Tamil, Telugu
- Government: Governors under the Vijayanagara Empire; Monarchy
- King
- History
  - Established: 1509
  - Disestablished: 1649
Preceded by	Succeeded by
Chola Empire; Vijayanagara Empire	Adil Shahi dynasty; British India

The Nayaks of Gingee (Senji) were Telugu rulers of the Gingee principality of present-day Tamil Nadu between 1509 and 1649. The Gingee Nayaks had their origins in the Balija warrior clans of present-day Andhra Pradesh. They were provincial governors under the Vijayanagara Empire, who divided the Tamil country into three Nayakships viz., Madurai, Tanjore and Gingee. Later, after the fall of the Vijayanagara's Tuluva dynasty, the Gingee rulers declared independence. While they ruled independently, they were sometimes at war with the Tanjore neighbors and the Vijayanagara overlords later based in Vellore and Chandragiri. Gingee ruler Surappa nayaka had a brother called Era Krishnappa Nayak whose son established himself in Karnataka and his family came to be known afterwards as the Belur Nayakas.

== Origins ==
Gingee Nayaks had their origins in the Balija warrior clans of present-day Andhra Pradesh. According to records in the Annual Report on South-Indian Epigraphy (1934–35), an inscription dated A.D. 1568 at the Veerapandi Kari Varadaraja Perumal Temple in Thirukovilur notes that Krishnappa Nayaka, the founder of the Gingee dynasty, belonged to the Kavarai community. Furthermore, the Tamil Jains Kaifiyat states that the Gingee ruler, Venkatapati Nayaka, was also from the Kavarai community. Kavarai is the Tamil name for Balijas who have settled in Tamil Nadu.

=== The Nayaka Rulers clan ===
The Gingee Nayak line was established by Tubaki (aka Tupakula) Krishnappa Nayaka, the son of Koneri Nayaka and grandnephew of Achyutappa Nayaka. Sanjay Subrahmanyam and Brennig provide the following details on Achyutappa Nayak:

... Achyutappa chetti, belonged to the Balija Chetti mercantile community, originally of Telugu extraction, but settled in the Tamil region as a part of the extensive migratory movement from the Andhra to the Tamil regions that began c.1350 and continued into our period. The family tree of Achyutappa – to the extent we are aware of it – was as follows: Siblings of Achyutappa: Achyutappa—Chinnana—Kesava—Brother(unknown)--Sister(unknown). Children of Kesava': Laksmana. Children of Achyutappa's Unknown Brother: Koneri—father of Krishnappa (the founder of Senji Nayaka kingdom)..

Some of the Nayakas in the Gingee line were:

1. Tubaki Krishnappa Nayak (1509–1521)
2. Chennappa Nayaka
3. Gangama Nayaka
4. Venkata Krishnappa Nayaka
5. Venkata Rama Bhupaala Nayaka
6. Thriyambamka Krishnappa Nayaka
7. Varadappa Nayaka
8. Ramalinga Nayani vaaru
9. Venkata Perumal Naidu
10. Periya Ramabhadra Naidu
11. Ramakrishnappa Naidu (- 1649)

Srinivasachari takes chronicles mentioned in copper plate grants into account and mentions the following nayakas in the Gingee line, noting governorship of Gingee began in Saka era 1386 / CE 1464:

1. 1490 - Vaiyappa Nayak
2. 1490-1520 - Tubaki Krishnappa Nayaka (originally Bala / Vala Krishnappa who became Tubbaki / Dubakki / Dubala Krishnappa in local legends).
3. 1520-1540 - Achyuta Vijaya Ramachandra Nayak
4. 1540-1550 - Muthialu Nayak
5. 1570-1600 - Venkatappa Nayak
6. 1600-1620 - Varadappa Nayak
7. Appa Nayak - up to Muslim conquest.

== Territory ==
The Gingee Nayak kingdom when established covered most of Northern Tamil Nadu including the present day Chennai, Puducherry and vast areas of Nellore, Chittoor, Vellore and Chandragiri. Its Southern boundary extended up to Kollidam River which marked the boundary between the Tanjavur and Madurai kingdoms. Later, during mid 16th centuries, the Gingee Nayaks lost control of the Vellore Fort and its Northern provinces when their erstwhile Vijayanagara overlords under Aravidu Dynasty took possession of these places and re-established their later Kingdom.

== History ==
=== Historical time ===
In 1509, under the orders of Krishnadeva Raya, Vaiyappa Nayak led the Vijayanagar forces against the local chieftains of the Gingee area. Thereafter, Krishnadevaraya consolidated this area under one of his men, Tubakki (or Tupakula) Krishnappa Nayaka.

Krishnappa Nayaka established a heredity line of Nayak rulers who ruled Gingee from 1509 to 1648 AD. Krishnappa Nayaka reign lasted from 1507 to 1521.

In some inscriptions, Krishnappa Nayaka is referred to as Krishnama Nayaka. As the son of Vaiyappa Nayaka and the father of Kondama Nayaka, his name variation reflects a common linguistic pattern found in South Indian epigraphy.

=== Krishnappa's rule ===
Krishnappa Nayak is said to be the founder of Gingee city. The earlier name of Gingee was Krishnapura. Krishnappa Nayak built the Singavaram Venkataramana and Venugopalaswami temples and other structures inside the Gingee Fort. Krishnappa was said be a native of Conjivaram (Kanchipuram) and kept a flower-garden dedicated to the God, Varadaraj Perumal. The granaries of the Gingee Fort, the Kalyana Mahal and the thick walls enclosing the three hills of Gingee are attributed to Krishnappa Nayaka. Although Gingee had been a fortified centre as early as 1240 CE, it was during the rule of Krishnappa that the present layout of the Garh Mahal (fort) was established. Krishnappa is said to be the first Nayaka who converted a fort into an outstanding example of military architecture. Krishnappa Nayaka's rule was fraught with wars against the Muslims. Raghunatha Nayaka of Tanjore is said to have secured the release of Krishnappa Nayaka from the Muhammedans with the sanction of the Vijayanagar emperor. A grateful Krishnappa reportedly gave away his daughter in marriage to the Tanjore king.

=== Krishnappa's family ===
Krishnappa Nayaka came from a family of merchants. He was the grandnephew of Achyutappa Chetti who was a trader, a broker and a shipping merchant. Achyutappa's home-base was Devanampattinam of Cuddalore which he got fortified using his ties with the Nayakas and local militia leaders. Initially no more than a broker and an interpreter, by the 1620s Achyutappa's power as an independent merchant came to be on the rise, as was his standing in the elite politics of southern and central coromandel. He was aided by his brothers Chinanna, Kesava and an other unnamed brother. Achyutappa manoeuvered his quasi-diplomatic position by mediating in the internecine warfare of the 1620s between the poligar factions of Senji (Gingee) and Chingleput regions.

Achyutappa's quasi-diplomatic rise in status also emerged from his relations with the King of Arakan and Nayak of Madurai and even the Cochin ruler who used Achyutappa as an intermediary while attempting a rapprochement with the Dutch in the early 1630s. Acyutappa's main trade was shipping. He dominated the coromandel coast. Until 1634, the Dutch East India Company (Verenigde Oostindische Compagnie or VOC) was almost completely dependent on Achyutappa and his relatives for the supply of rice to provision company factories. Together with Chinnana, Koneri, Kesava and Laksmana, Tubaki Krishnappa Nayak owned the Coromadel Shipping, with Royal Shipping as a partner. The Royal Shipping was owned by the rulers of Ayutthaya, Arakan and Kedah of Southeast Asia.

However, Acyutappa's activities were diversified. By the 1620s, along with his brother Chinnana, Achyutappa had become increasingly involved in farming revenue in the territories of the Nayakas and the Chandragiri ruler. When Acyutappa died in Mar 1634, the mantle of VOC's chief broker of Coromandel fell on his brother Chinanna.

Chinnanna lived an exorbitant lifestyle with 40 wives and innumerable children. Chinanna was politically more ambitious than his brother, Achyutappa, with a penchant for diplomacy and even direct participation as a field general in internecine warfare of the 1630s. However, his abrasiveness led him to fall out with his own brother Kesava and his nephews Seshadra and Laksmana. By early 1638, the family feud led Kesava and Lakshmana to persuade Tubaki Krisnappa to take Koneri as a prisoner. Koneri fled and sought refuge under Chinanna. However, when faced with the superior force of Tubaki Krishnappa, Chinanna surrendered.

== Descendants ==
Sankariah Naidu, Zamindar of Chennappa Naicken Palayam was a descendant of Tubaki Krishnappa Nayak, the ruler of the Gingee. He was born on 1754 to a Telugu-speaking Balija merchant family in Cuddalore, then a part of the South Arcot district of the Madras Presidency. His father, Komarappa Naidu, who was a trader and a shipping merchant.

== See also ==
- Madurai Nayak dynasty
- Thanjavur Nayak kingdom

== Bibliography ==
- Subrahmanyam, Sanjay (2002). The Political Economy of Commerce: Southern India 1500–1650 (Reprinted ed.). Cambridge University Press. ISBN 9780521892261.
