= Kuruvathi Basaveshwara Temple =

Hindu temple in Karnataka, India

Kuruvathi Basaveshwara temple
- Shri Kuruvathi Basaveshwara Temple
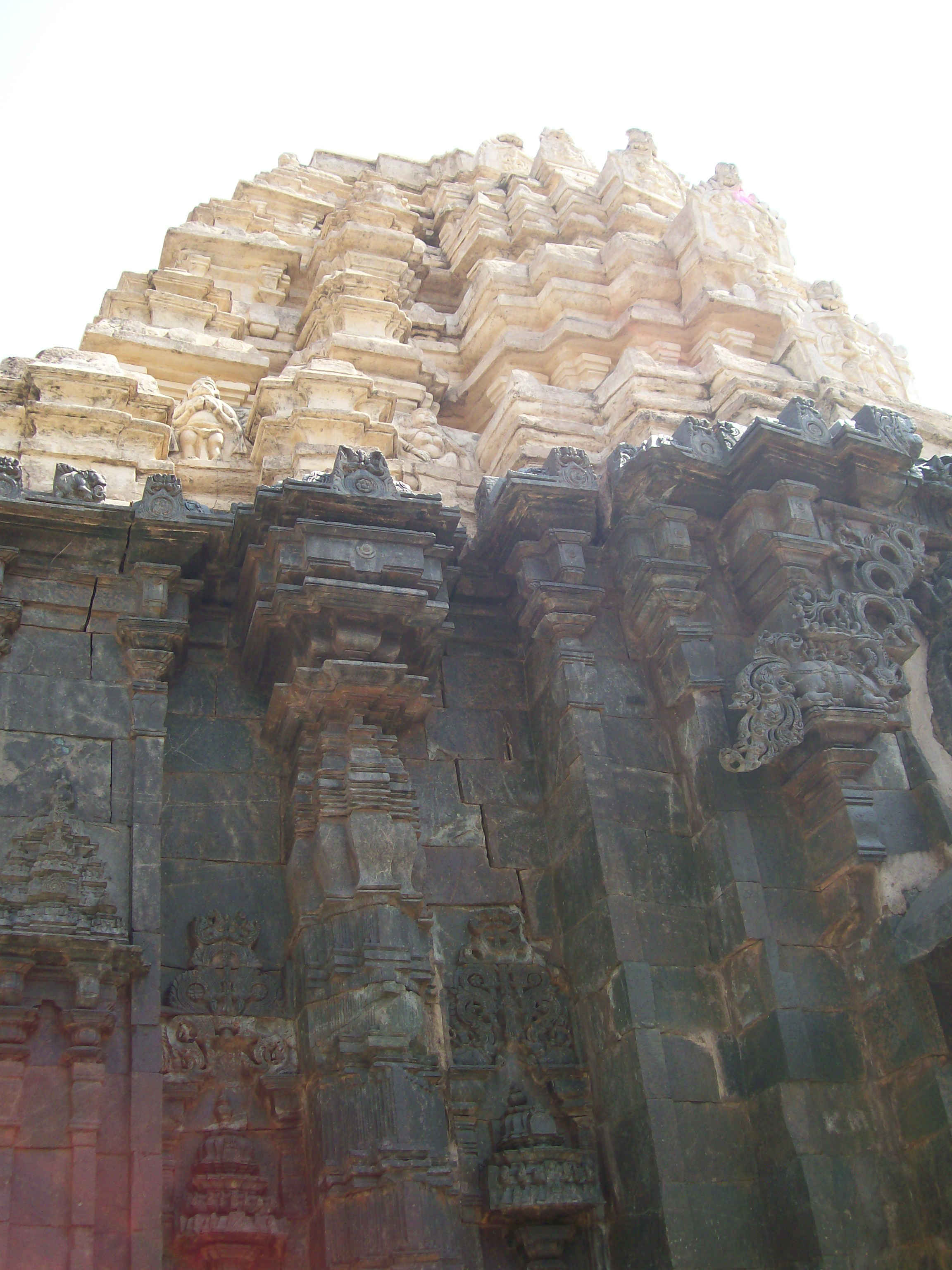

- Location in Karnataka

Religion
- Affiliation: Hinduism
- District: Vijayanagara
- Deity: Basaveshwara (Nandi)
- Festival: Maha Shivaratri

Location
- Location: Hoovina Hadagali
- State: Karnataka
- Country: India
- Coordinates: 14.78°N 75.70°E

Architecture
- Type: Vijayanagara architecture, Western Chalukya architecture
- Creator: Vijaynagara Emperor
- Completed: 14th century A.D.

Specifications
- Temple: 2
- Monument: 1 (Eka kuta)
- Elevation: 515 m (1,690 ft)

Kuruvathi Basaveshwara temple at Kuruvathi (Kannada: ಕುರುವತ್ತಿ) is a temple at the extreme southwestern corner of Hoovina Hadagali taluk, Vijayanagara District, Karnataka, India. It is on the bank of Tungabhadra river, 16 km from Halavagalu and 3 km from Mylara.

== Geography ==
The temple is located at latitude 14.78427° north, longitude 75.702455° east, and has an elevation of 515 meters above sea level.
