= Immadi Jagadevaraya =

King of Channapatna

Jagadevaraya was the king of Channapatna.

== Biography ==
Immadi Jagadevaraya was the youngest son of rana jagadevaraya, who ruled Baramahal region. He belongs to Vishnuvardhana gotra. He was a great warrior when the Kutubshah army attacked Penugonda, Venkatapati Raya, the Vijayanagara Emperor sought the help of Immadi Jagadevaraya. Immadi Jagadevaraya with a large army, came to Penugonda, and shattered the army of Kutubshah. He completely routed them. Venkatapati Raya was very much pleased with Immadi Jagadevaraya, and bestowed on him the territory around Channapatna in Mysore State for his services. He made Channapatna his capital and his territory of Baramahal was extended across Mysore to the Western Ghats, Immadi Jagadevaraya and his family ruled the territory of Baramahal along with Mysore. He belonged to the Telugu-speaking Balija clan. The king himself composed an epic Telugu poem Adhyatma Ramayana and Chandikaratnamu. His Sanskrit written Uttara Naishadha. After the ruling of Immadi Jagadevaraya his descendants Rana Ankusa Raya, Rana Kumara Jagadeva Raya, Immadi Ankusa Raya ruled this Channapatna territory.
