= Velcheru Narayana Rao =

Indian author, critic

- Born: Andhra Pradesh, India
- Education: Ph.D. (1974)
- Alma mater: Andhra University; Osmania University
- Occupations: Author; Critic; Researcher; Translator
- Children: Sarayu Rao
- Relatives: See Nidudavolu Family
- Awards: Sahitya Akademi Fellowship

Velcheru Narayana Rao is an Indian author, critic, and literary translator. He is a professor at the University of Wisconsin–Madison in the Department of South Asian Studies. His work is primarily focused on Telugu literature for which he received the Sahitya Akademi Fellowship, the highest honour conferred by Sahitya Akademi, in February 2021.

== Early life ==
Velcheru Narayana Rao was born in Ambakhandi, Srikakulam district, Andhra Pradesh, India. He later moved to Eluru, Andhra Pradesh. He completed his B.A. from Sir C. R. Reddy College in Eluru. He obtained his M.A. from Andhra University in 1968, and later obtained a diploma in linguistics from Osmania University in 1970. He earned a Ph.D. from Andhra University in 1974.

== Work ==
In 1971, Narayana Rao was appointed a lecturer in the Department of South Asian Studies at the University of Wisconsin-Madison. In 1987 he became a professor at the university. He has also been a visiting professor at the University of Chicago and Emory University.

Narayana Rao has translated several Telugu language books into English including Gurajada Apparao's Kanyasulkam as Girls for Sale: Kanyasulkam, A Play from Colonial India and Allasani Peddana's Manu Charitramu as The Story of Manu. He has co-authored books with David Shulman and Sanjay Subrahmanyam such as God on the Hills: Temple Songs from Tirupati and Textures of Time: Writing History in South India. He also wrote a book on Telugu poetry titled Hibiscus on the Lake: Twentieth Century Telugu Poetry from India.

== Bibliography ==
- 1998 (with David Shulman), A Poem at the Right Moment: Remembered Verses from Premodern South India, University of California Press.
- 2002 (with David Shulman and Sanjay Subrahmanyam), Textures of Time: Writing History in South India, Paris, Seuil, Permanent Black, Delhi.
- 2002 (with David Shulman), Classical Telugu Poetry: An Anthology, University of California Press, Oxford University Press, New Delhi.
- 2002 (with David Shulman), The Sound of the Kiss, or the Story that Must be Told. Pingali Suranna's Kaḷāpūrṇōdayamu, Columbia University Press.
- 2002 (with David Shulman), A Lover's Guide to Warangal. The Kridabhiramamu of Vallabharaya, Permanent Black, New Delhi.
- 2006 (Translation, with David Shulman) The Demon's Daughter: A Love Story from South India, (by Piṅgaḷi Sūrana) SUNY Press, Albany.
- 2005 (with David Shulman), God on the Hill: Temple poems from Tirupati, Oxford University Press, New York.
- 2012 (With David Shulman) Srinatha: The Poet who Made Gods and Kings, Oxford University Press.
- 2015 (Translation of Allasani Peddana, with David Shulman) The Story of Manu. Murti Classical Library of India.
