= Halavagalu =

- Village
- Location in Karnataka, India
- Coordinates: 15.017°N 75.95°E
- Country: India
- State: Karnataka
- District: Vijayanagara
- Taluk: Harapanahalli

Languages
  - Official: Kannada
- Time zone: UTC+5:30 (IST)
- Postal code: 583 213
- Vehicle registration: KA-35

Halavagalu is a major village in the whole Harapanahalli taluk of Vijayanagara district in the Indian state of Karnataka.
