= Nayakas of Belur =

Indian Ruling Dynasty

- 1397–1802
- Capital: Aigoor
- Common languages: Kannada, Telugu
- Religion: Hinduism
- Government: Monarchy
- King
- History
  - Established: 1397
  - Disestablished: 1802
Preceded by	Succeeded by
Hoysala Kingdom; Vijayanagara Empire	Wadiyar dynasty; Nayakas of Keladi

Nayakas of Belur, also known as Nayakas of Balam and Manjarabad Nayakas, were an Indian dynasty based in Belur in present-day Hassan district of Karnataka, India. Originally vassals of the Vijayanagara Empire, they became an independent and important ruling dynasty in their own right with the decline of Vijayanagara. The Belur Nayaks had their origins in the Balija warrior clans of present-day Andhra Pradesh. Their capital was Aigoor in Hassan district.

== Origin ==
According to the Vasudhare grama Kaifiyat mentions the Belur chiefs were originally Telugu Balijas. historian Noboru Karashima note that Belur nayaks under the Vijayanagara Empire were Telugu Balijas.

== The Nayaka clan ==
Singappa Nayak was the Vijayanagara viceroy to Belur in south Karnataka during the 14th century. He was the son of Manchayya Nayaka. Singappa Nayak was then succeeded by his son Chikka Singappa Nayak. after Singappa Nayaka, up to the 16th century nothing definite is known about the chiefs of this principality.

Era Krishappa Nayak (1524-1566 A.D.) was a loyal vassal of the Vijayanagara Emperors and assisted them in their campaigns. He was the son of Pottappa Nayaka and his brother named Surappa Nayaka, ruled gingee region. He served as the Tambula Karandavahin (lit. 'betel-bearer') to Krishna Deva Raya. Era Krishappa Nayak was then succeeded by his son Venkatadri Nayaka. It remained in the hands of this family till the fall of Seringapatam in 1799. venkatadri nayaka, the last chief of the line rebelled against the British and was seized and hanged in 1802.

== Territory ==
The Belur Nayak kingdom when established covered most of South Karnataka including the present day Hassan and Kodagu.

== Decline ==
In 1645 the Belur kingdom was overrun by the Keladi chief Shivappa Nayaka and bestowed by him on Sriranga III, the defeated king of Vijayanagar who had fled to him for refuge.

== List of Nayaks ==
The list of nayaks is unclear. Some of the Nayaks are:

- Hiriya Singappa Nayaka
- Manchayya Nayaka
- Baiyappa Nayaka
- Era Krishnappa Nayaka (1524–1566)
- Venkatadri Nayaka (1566–1584)
- Krishnappa Nayaka (1588 -1625)
- Lakshmappa Nayaka (1588 - 1605)
- Tirumalai Nayaka (1640)
- Venkatadri Nayaka (1626 -1548)
- Krishnappa Nayaka (1548 - 1554)
- Venkatadri Nayaka (1655 -1670)
- Krishnappa Nayaka (1685 - 1692)
- Krishnappa Nayaka (1711 - 1712)
- Venkatadri Nayaka (1708 - 1752)
- Krishnappa Nayaka (1755 - 1794)
- Venkatadri Nayaka (1799 - 1802)
