= Quilon Syrian copper plates =

9th-century royal grant issued to a Syrian Christian merchant in Kerala, India

- Tharisappally Pattayam; Kottayam Cheppedukal
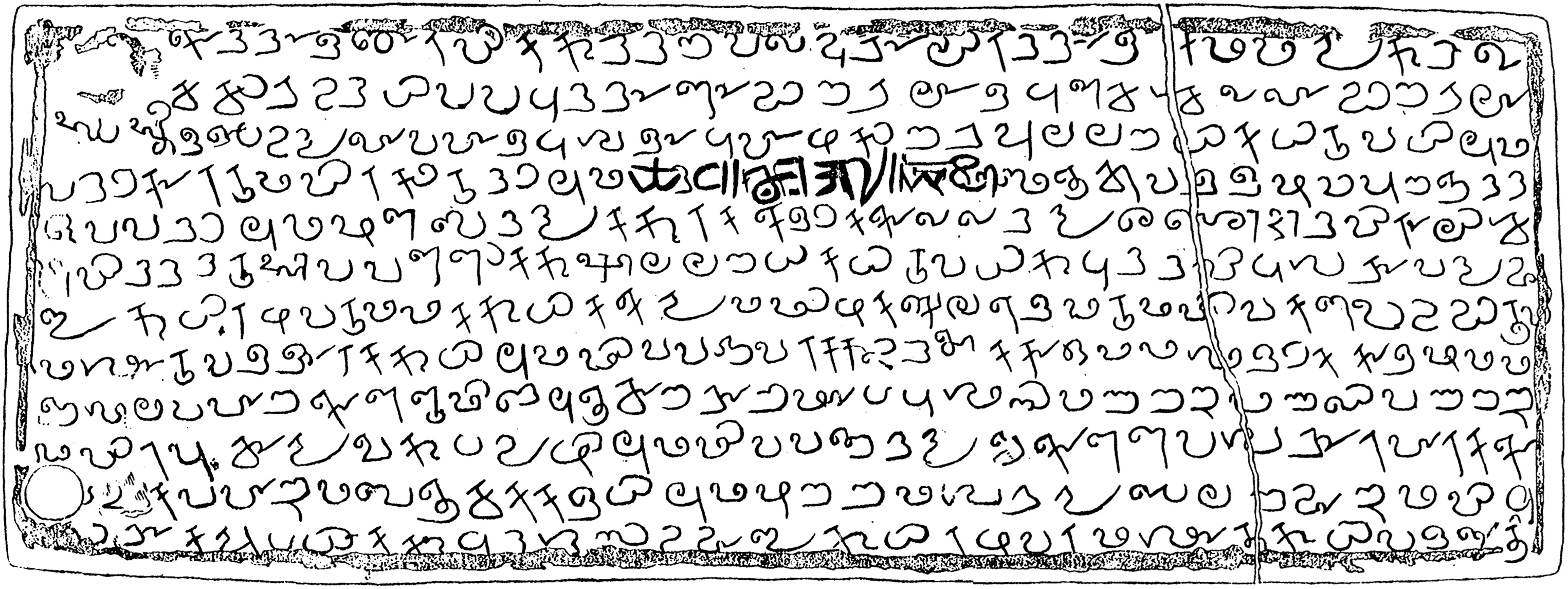
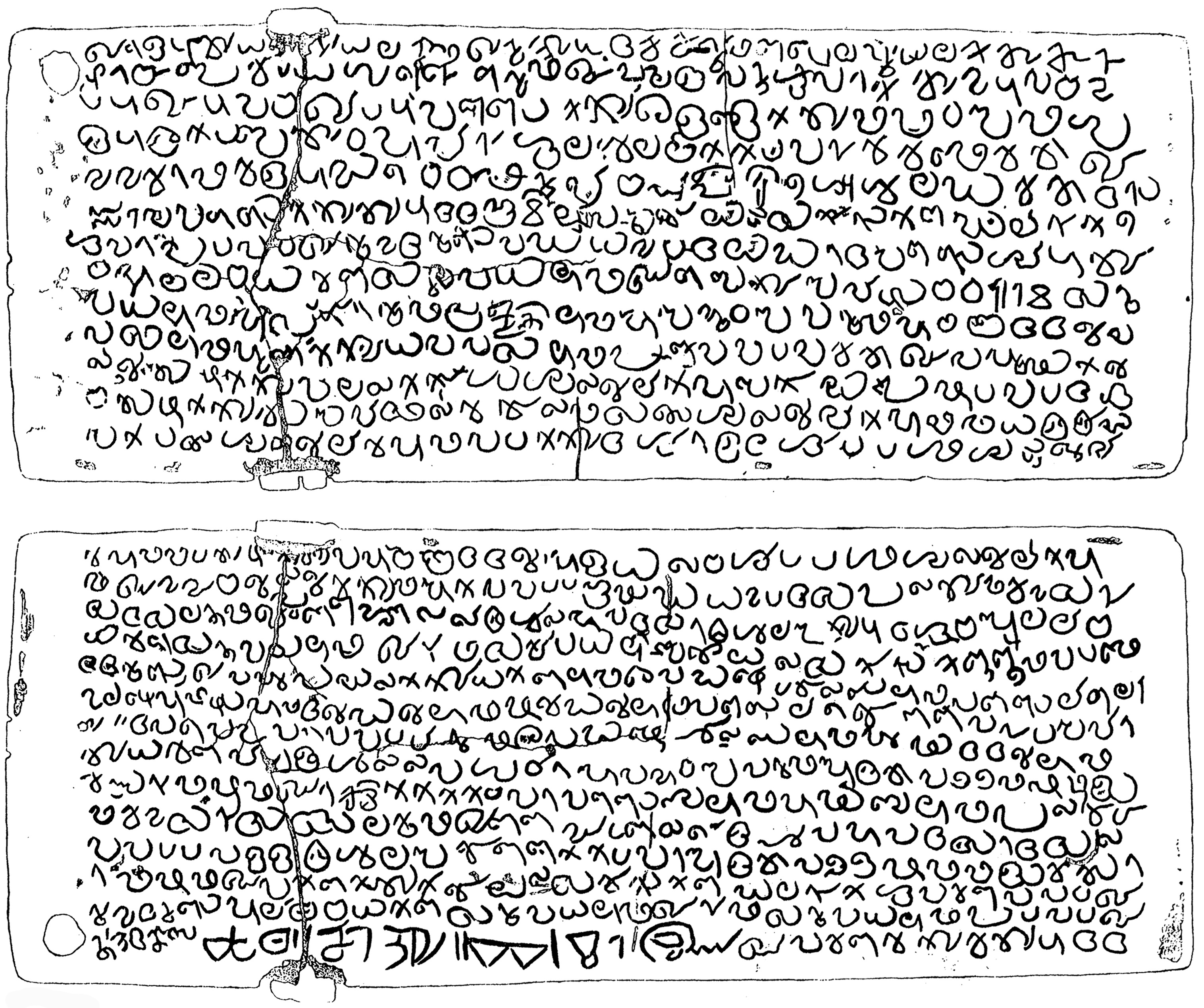
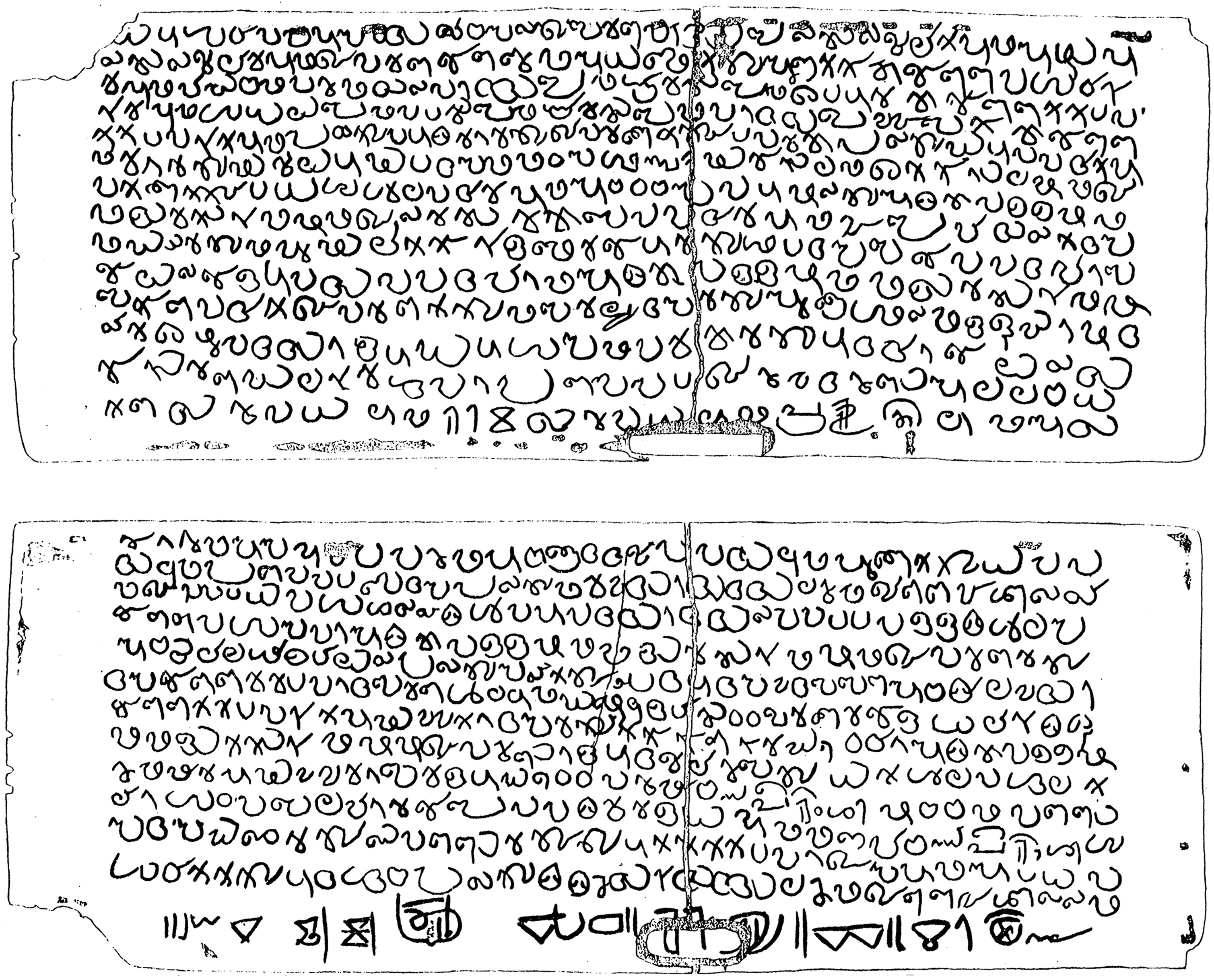
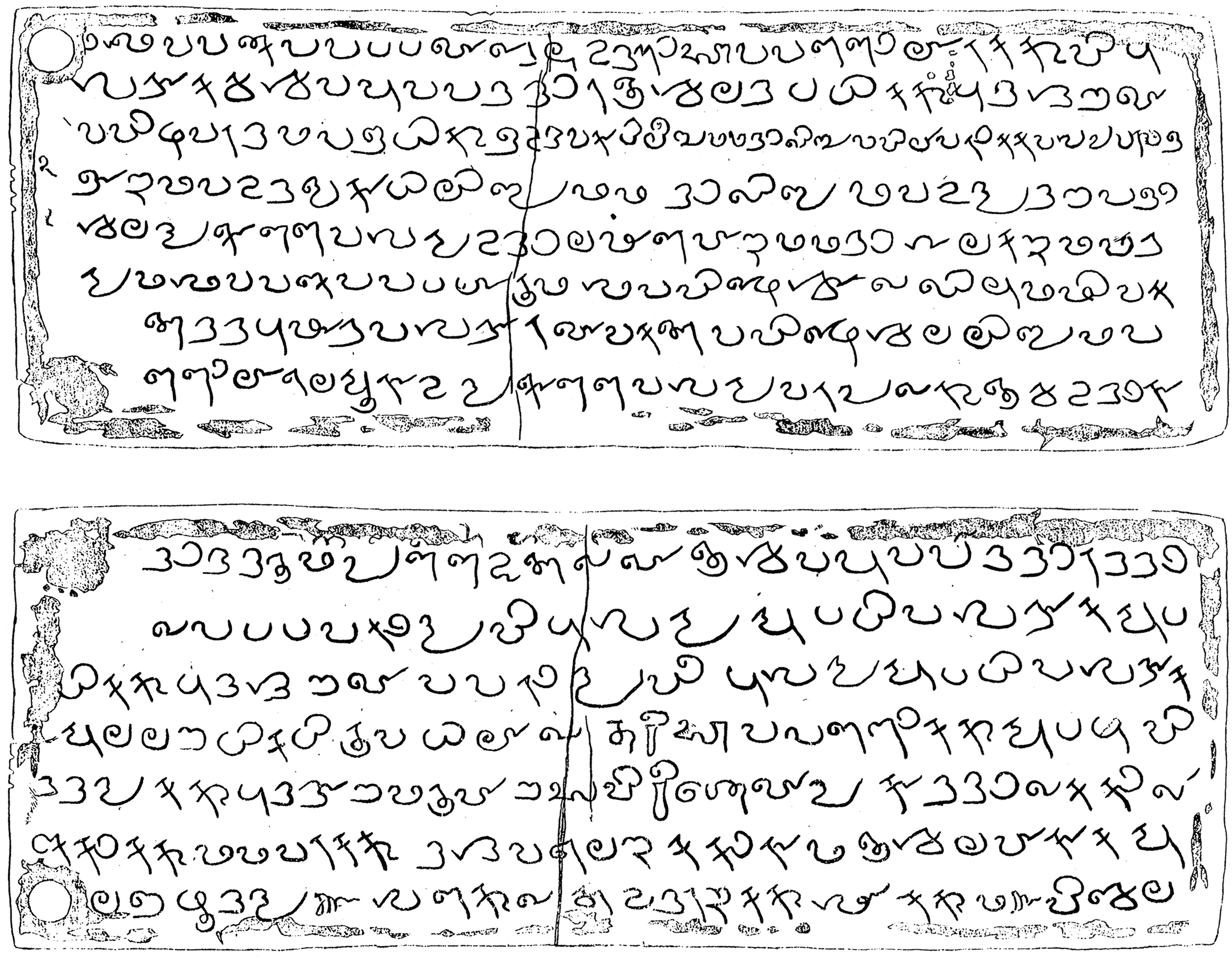
- Quilon Syrian copper plates
- Material: Copper
- Writing: Malayalam or Tamil
- Created: 849 CE; Kerala, India
- Present location: Devalokam Aramana; Poolatheen Aramana

The Kollam (Quilon) Syrian copper plates, also known as the Kollam Tarisappalli copper plates, or Kottayam inscription of Sthanu Ravi, or Tabula Quilonensis (c. 849 CE) are a copper plate grant issued by Ayyan Adikal, the chieftain of Kollam, conferring privileges upon a Syrian Christian merchant named Maruvan Sapir Iso, in the name of the Tarissapalli (the Christian church) in Kollam, located on the Malabar Coast of southern India. The inscription, which is notably incomplete, is engraved on five copper plates (four horizontal and one vertical) in Old Malayalam or Middle Tamil, using the Vattezhuthu script with necessary Grantha characters. It is considered the oldest available inscription from the medieval Chera dynasty of Kerala.

The charter is dated to the fifth regnal year of medieval Chera ruler Sthanu Ravi Kulasekhara (849/850 CE). The fifth plate contains signatures of witnesses to the grant in Arabic (Kufic script ), Middle Persian (cursive Pahlavi script), and Judeo-Persian (standard square Hebrew script), indicating the presence of Jewish and Muslim communities in Kerala.

One part of the copper plates (four plates) is preserved at the Devalokam Aramana of the Malankara Orthodox Syrian Church, while the other two smaller plates are kept at the Poolatheen Aramana in Thiruvalla, belonging to the Malankara Mar Thoma Syrian Church.

== Summarized prescription ==
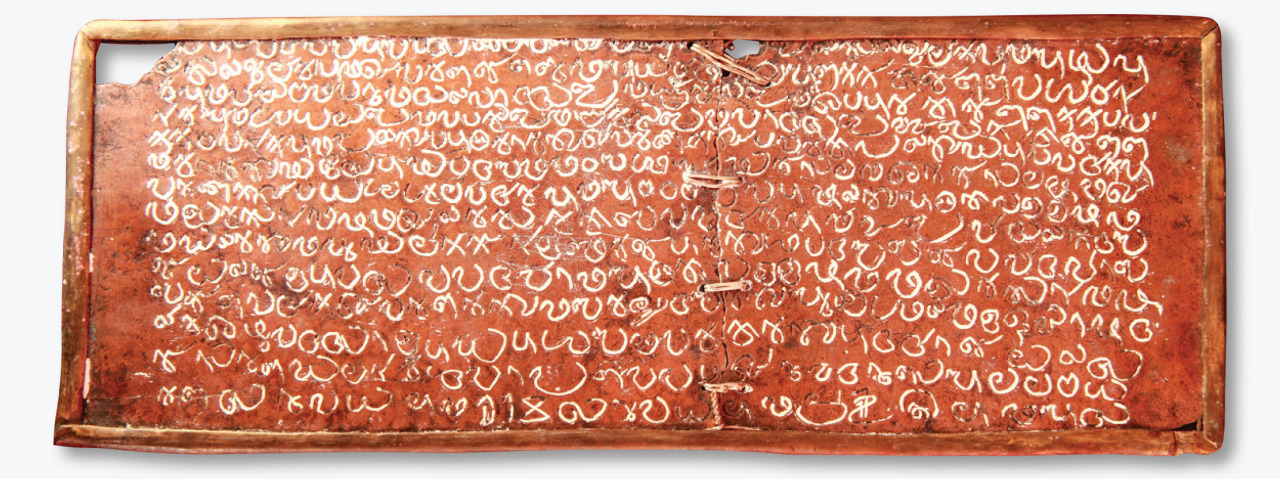
Quilon Syrian copper plates (Plate 3, obverse)

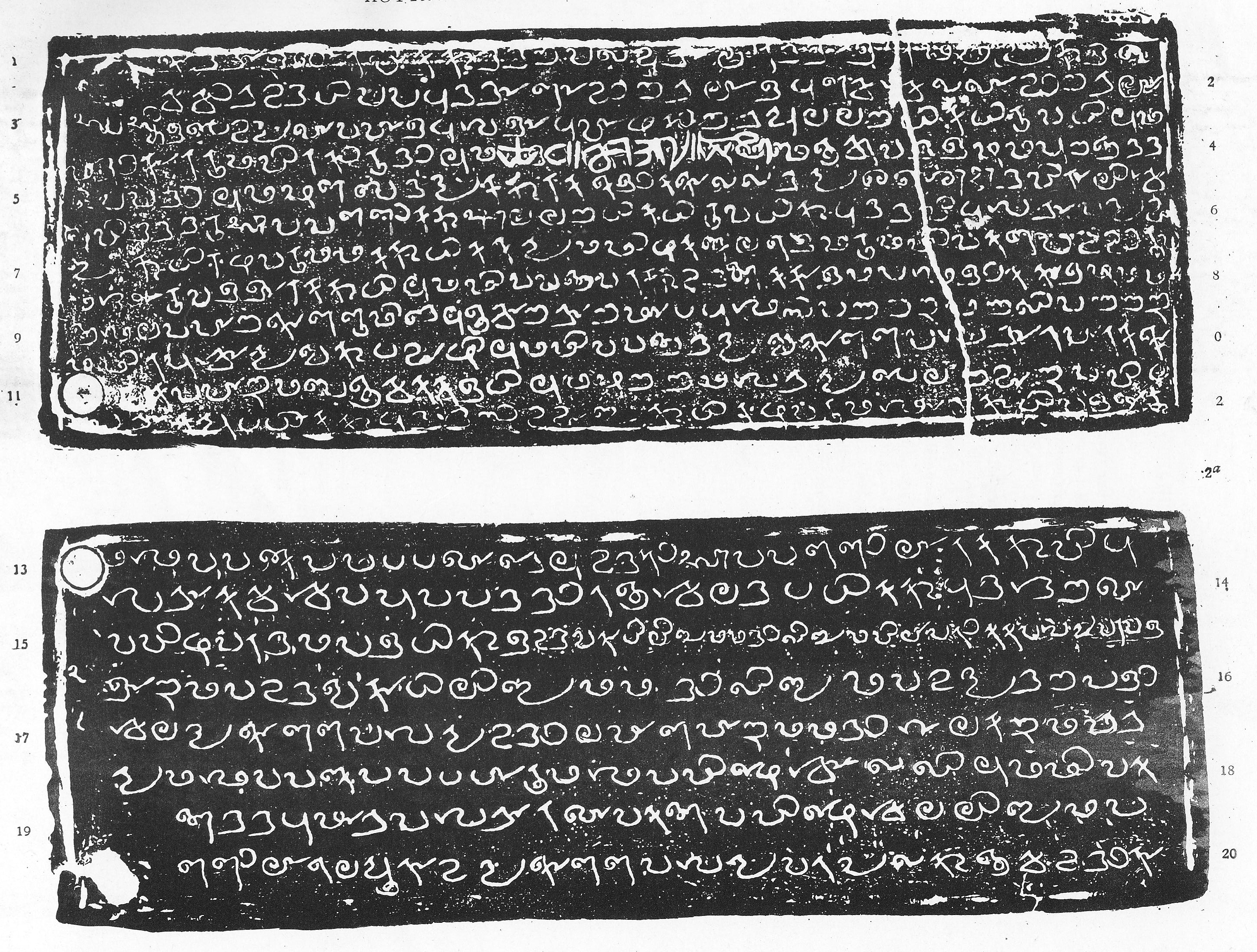
Quilon Syrian copper plates (849 AD, plates 1 and 4)

The grant is dated to the fifth regnal year (849/50 CE) of the medieval Chera ruler of Kerala, Sthanu Ravi (Old Malayalam and Tamil: Tanu Ravi). It was drafted in the presence of Chera prince Vijayaraga, Venad chieftain Ayyan Adikal Thiruvadikal, junior chieftain Rama Thiruvadikal, other important officers of the Venad chiefdom (such as the adhikarar, the prakrithi, the punnathala padi, and the pulakkudi padi) and representatives of the merchant guilds anjuvannam and manigramam.

The charter grants land to the Christian merchant Mar Sapir Iso, described in it as "the founder of the Kollam trading city (the nagara) and the builder of the Kollam Tarisa Church". The land, evidently a large settlement with its bonded occupants (serfs), is donated as an "attipperu" by Ayyan Adikal. Attipperu, or dhara-purvaka, was perhaps a precursor to the later "janmam" tenure. Sapir Iso also recruited two merchant guilds — the anjuvannam and the manigramam — as the tenants of the nagara under the karanmai tenure. The Six Hundred, the Nair militia of Venad, was entrusted with the protection of the nagara and the church. The charter also granted bonded serfs to the nagara and the church, including personnel such as agricultural laborers (the vellalars), thachar they are not from Vishwakarma community, the ezhavar and, salt-makers (the eruviyar).

Additionally, the charter granted Sapir Iso several titles, rights, and aristocratic privileges. It also states that all revenues from the donated land and its occupants were "exempted", which perhaps meant that these were to be transferred to the church.

- The record also contains few characters in some undeciphered script/language(s).
- Until 2013, it was believed that the five plates represented two separate grants (dated separately), issued at different times, to Syrian Christian merchants on the Malabar Coast.
- A second inscription mentioning another "Tarisappalli" was discovered in Periyapattinam in 2022 (Periyapattinam Inscription).

== Text ==
Following is a widely accepted English translation of the inscription (Narayanan, in "Cultural Symbiosis in Kerala", 1972). The 2013 study on the plates does not provide an English translation.

Change in Plate Arrangements
1972 Arrangement			2013 Arrangement
Grant No. 1 (Grant No. A2)	Epigraphically dated to an earlier period.	Plate 1 (on one side only)	Plate 1
Grant No. 1 (Grant No. A2)	Epigraphically dated to an earlier period.	Plate 2 (on both sides) [text interrupted at the end]	Plate 4 [interrupted]
Grant No. 2 (Grant No. A6)	Epigraphically dated to a later period (possible re-engraving).	Plate 1 (on both sides)	Plate 2
Grant No. 2 (Grant No. A6)	Epigraphically dated to a later period (possible re-engraving).	Plate 2 (on both sides)	Plate 3
Grant No. 2 (Grant No. A6)		Vertical Plate	Vertical Plate

Grant No. 1. (Grant No. A2) — First and Second Plates (Plate 1 and Plate 4)

"Hail Prosperity! The fifth year of the many hundreds of thousands of years during which king Sthanu Ravi is destined to rule victorious after conquering his enemies. In this year while Ayyan Atikal Tiruvatikal, who is the governor [sic] of Venatu, Adhikarar, Prakriti, Manigramam and Ancuvannam, and the Pati of Punnaittalai sat together, Ayyan Atikal Tiruvatikal granted as gift to the church of Tarsa, established at Kurakkeni Kollam by Esoda Tapirayi, four families of Ilavar and eight Ilava males belonging to these families, making up twelve in total, and one family of Vannar. No Talaikkanam or Enikkanam or Manaimeypan Kollum irai or Cantan mattu menipponnu or Polipponnu or Iravu Coru or Kutanali shall be collected from any of these people. I have also granted Varakkol, Kappan and Paincakkanti which were formerly enjoyed by them. I have granted as mentioned in this copper-plate these four families of Ilavar, one family of Vannar and all forms of taxes to the authorities of the church of Tarsa. These Ilavar may bring their cart to the bazaar and the fort and do business there. The Vannan may also come to the bazaar and the fort and ply his trade. The Tiyamalvan, the Matinayakan, and others shall not obstruct them on account of any offence. If they commit any offence whatsoever, the Palliyar alone shall enquire into them. I have granted all these privileges mentioned in the copper-plate to last as long as the world, the moon and the sun endure. Maruvan Sapir Iso caused Ayyan Atikal Tiruvatikal to grant these privileges to the church of Tarsa. May God bless those who protect this grant. This is the writing of Ayyan. (Signature) This is agreed to by Velkulasundaran. (Signature) Vijaya...

Grant No. 2. (Grant No. A6) — First and Second Plates (Plate 2 and Plate 3)

"This is the land which Maruvan Sapir Iso, who received this Nagaram with libation of water, presented to the church of Tarsa after making arrangements for two families of ____, one family of Tachar, and four families of Vellalar who are the tenants of the gift land, to guarantee that the church is not lacking anything in the form of oil etc. by sowing what is to be sown and giving what is to be given. Ayyan Atikal Tiruvati, Rama Tiruvati the crown prince, Adhikarar, Prakriti, Arunurruvar, and the Patis of Punnaittalai and Pulaikkuti sitting together with Vijayaragadeva the Koyil Adhikarikal, and after performing the ceremony of walking the female elephant and pouring out water, fixed the boundaries of this land thus:— Vayalkkatu shall be the boundary in the east; The wall of Ciruvatilkkal along with the palace shall be the boundary in the south east; the sea shall be the boundary in the west; Toranattottam shall be the boundary in the north; and Punnattalai Antilantottam shall be the boundary in the north east. I have granted with copper-plate the land within these four boundaries after the ceremony of walking the female elephant so that it shall remain as long as the world, the moon and the sun endure; I did this sitting together with Ayyanatikal Tiruvati, Rama Tiruvati, and the Koyiladhikarikal. The Palliyar alone shall fine and ... the settlers on this land on account of any offence. The Palliyar alone shall receive head price and breast price. None of our servants shall, on account of any offence, encroach upon this land. The Arunurruvar, Ancuvannam and Manikkiramam shall protect the church and its land. The Ancuvannam and Manikkiramam shall protect the church and its land. The Ancuvannam and Manikkiramam shall serve these people as mentioned in the copper-plates as long as the world, the moon and the sun endure. The following are the privileges granted to these people when Ayyan Atikal Tiruvati and Irama Tiruvati sat together with Koyiladhikarikal Vijayaragadeva. They are exempted from the one-sixtieth duty at the time of entrance and at the time of sale. Slave-tax shall not be realised for the slaves purchased by them. They shall pay eight Kasu per carriage at the time of entrance and at the time of departure, and four Kasu per boat at the time of entrance and departure. Taxable articles shall be taxed in consultation with them. His majesty's business in anything like the fixation of the price of articles shall be conducted in association with them. The Ancuvannam and Manikkiramam shall keep the duty collected each day after affiixing [sic] the seal. When any land within the four gates of the fort is obstructed and leased out to tenants, the one-tenth share of the sovereign shall go to the prince and the one-tenth share of the lord shall go to Ancuvannam and Manikkiramam. Ayyan Atikal Tiruvati, Rama Tiruvati, Prakriti, Adhikarar, Arunurruvar, Punnaittalai Pati, and Pulaikkuti Pati sitting together with Koyil Adhikarikal Vijayaragadeva, conferred on these people the seventy two privileges beginning with earth and water on elephant back for marriages. The Ancuvannam and Manikkiramam shall enjoy all these privileges and act according to the copper-plates as long as the world, the moon and the sun endure. If they have any grievance they are authorised to reddress the grievance even by obstructing the payment of duty and weighing fee. The Ancuvannam and Manikkiramam who took up the tenancy of the Nagaram with libation of water shall themselves enquire into offences committed by their people. That which is done jointly by these two heads alone shall be valid. In the case of The Varakkol and Pancakkanti which Maravan Sapir Iso who received this Nagaram with libation of water had earned for the Palliyar earlier, Maruvan Sapir Iso shall keep the measure and hand over the measuring fee to the church. I have given all this with absolute rights to last as long as the moon and the sun endure."

=== Witnesses to grant ===
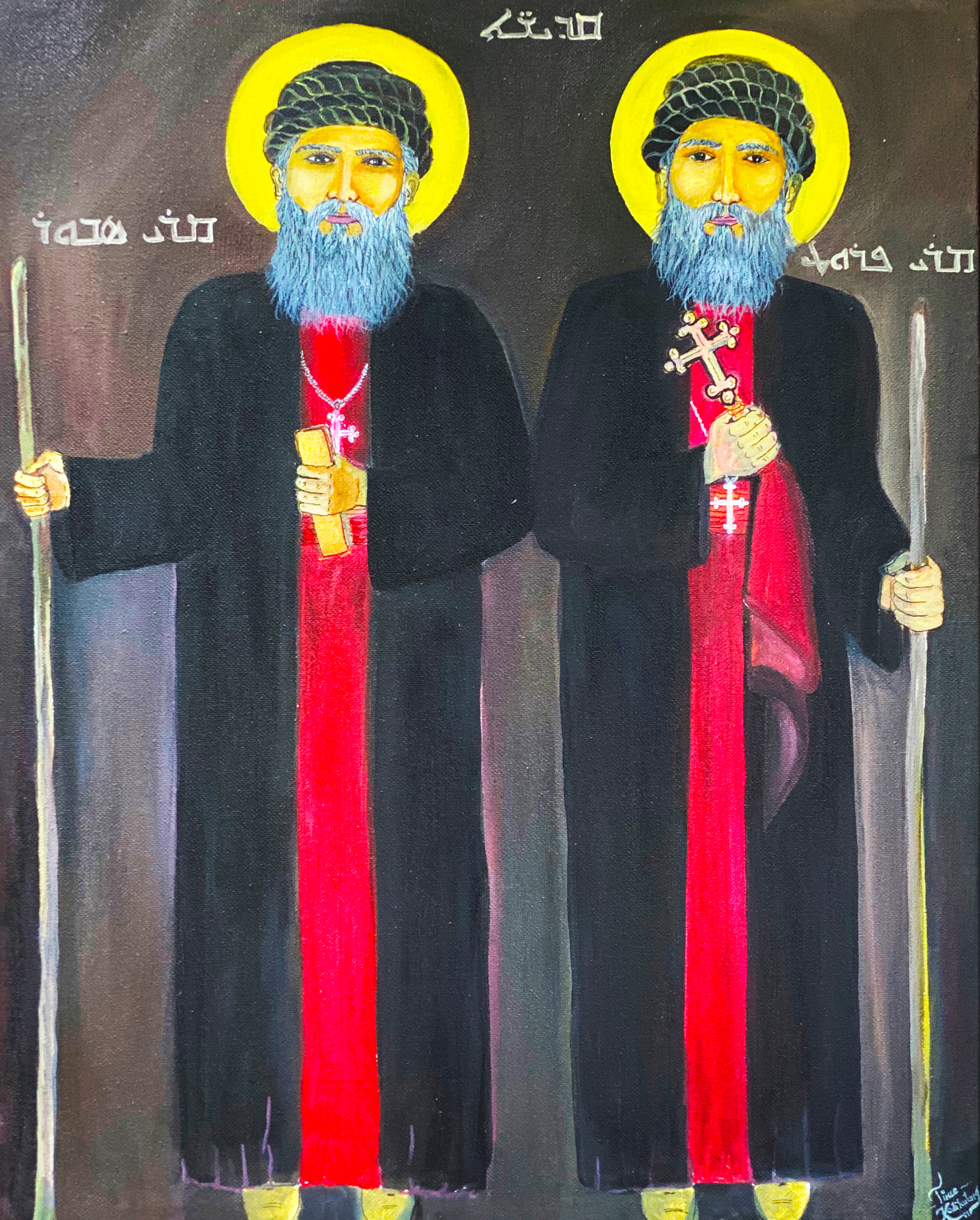
A modern depiction of Mar Sabor and Mar Proth.

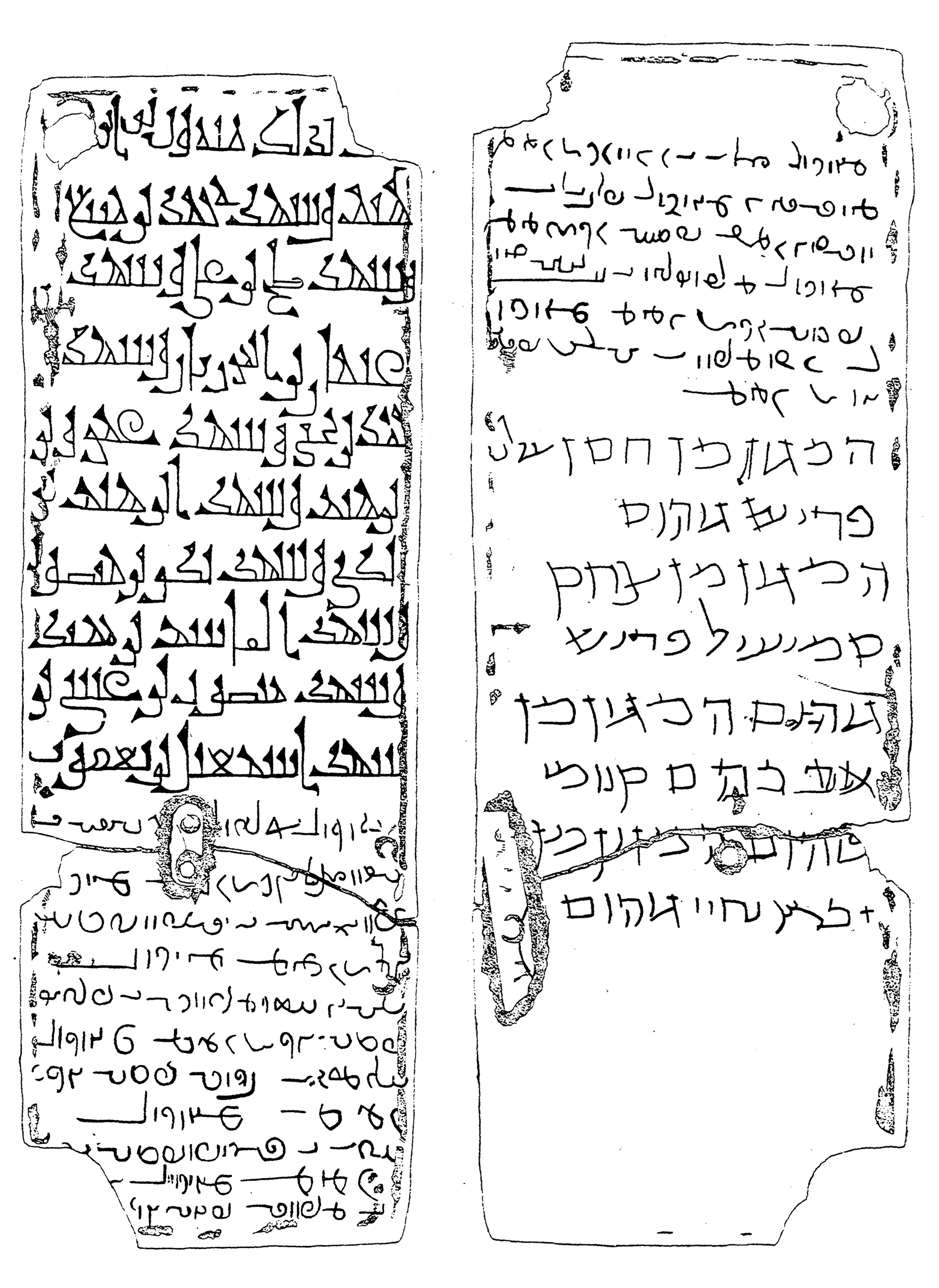
Quilon Syrian copper plates (plate 5)

The vertical plate (plate number 5) contains several signatures of witnesses to the grant in Arabic (Kufic script), Middle Persian (cursive Pahlavi script), and Judeo-Persian (standard square Hebrew script).

Arabic signatures ― Kufic script

- Maymūn, son of Ibrahīm
- Muḥammad, son of Manīḥ
- Ṣulḥ, son of 'Alī
- 'Uṯmān, son of al-Marzubān
- Muḥammad, son of Yaḥyā
- 'Amru, son of Ibrahīm
- Ibrahīm, son of al-Ṭay
- Bakr, son of Mansūr
- al-Qāsim, son of Ḥamīd
- Manṣūr, son of 'Isā
- Isma'īl, son of Ya'qūb

Middle Persian signatures ― Cursive Pahlavi script

- Farrox, son of (N)arseh, son of Šahrābān
- Yōhanan, son of Mašya, son of Wehzād
- Šahdōst, son of Mardweh, son of Farroxīg
- Sēnmihr, son of Bayweh
- *Sīnā, son of Yākub
- [...], son of Mardweh
- Marōē, son of Yōhanan
- Farrbay, son of Windād-Ohrmazd
- Mard-Farrox, son of Bōyšād
- Āzādmard, son of Ahlā

Judeo-Persian signatures ― Standard Square Hebrew script

- Hasan 'Ali
- Saḥaq
- *Sama'ēl
- Abraham Quwami
- Kuruš Yaḥiya

== Mention of Thomas of Cana ==
The presently available text of the Quilon Syrian copper plates is notably incomplete (interrupting at the end of plate 4). However, two seemingly complete transcripts of the inscription are extant. These are the Garshuni Malayalam script transcript (17th century) and the French text of du Perron (18th century). The interrupted content of plate 4 continues in du Perron’s French text (with the names of seventeen local notables, some of whom were mentioned earlier). After that comes a passage mentioning the famous Thomas of Cana or "Knai Thoma" episode (available in both transcripts). This passage, too, is later interrupted (and the signatures in Arabic and Persian follow).

It is speculated that this portion is nothing other than the first part of the lost Thomas of Cana copper plates. This grant was issued by an unidentified medieval Chera king of Kerala to the Christian merchants in the city of "Makotayar Pattinam" (Mahodayapuram, present day Kodungallur). The dating of the record remains a matter of scholarly debate. The Quilon Syrian copper plates (available text) also include a reference to a prior grant, stating that the Christians had previously been endowed with certain rights by the Chera ruler at Mahodayapuram.

The French text of du Perron (translation):

"The history of the founding of the town of Cranganore when Pattanam was the City, (he) visited, revered and requested the Emperor and the Minister at Kolla Kodungalloor for a marsh where thickets grow. Measured by Anakol (elephant kol) 4,444 kols of land was granted in the year of the Jupiter in Kubham, on the 29th of Makaram, 31 the Saturday, Rohini and Saptami (7th day of the moon),' the palace, great temple and school at Irinjalakuda also were founded. The same day that place was called Makothevar pattanam (the town of the Great God), and it was made the city (capital). From there privileges such as drawbridge at gates, ornamented arches, mounted horse with two drums, cheers, conch blowing, salutes were granted in writing to the Christian foreigner called Knaye Thoma with sacred threat and libation of water and flower. The sun and the moon are witnesses to this. Written to the kings of all times."

Scholar Perczel gives the following explanation for the presence of Thomas of Cana text within Quilon Syrian copper plates transcripts.

French text of du Perron (Introduction, Zend Avesta)

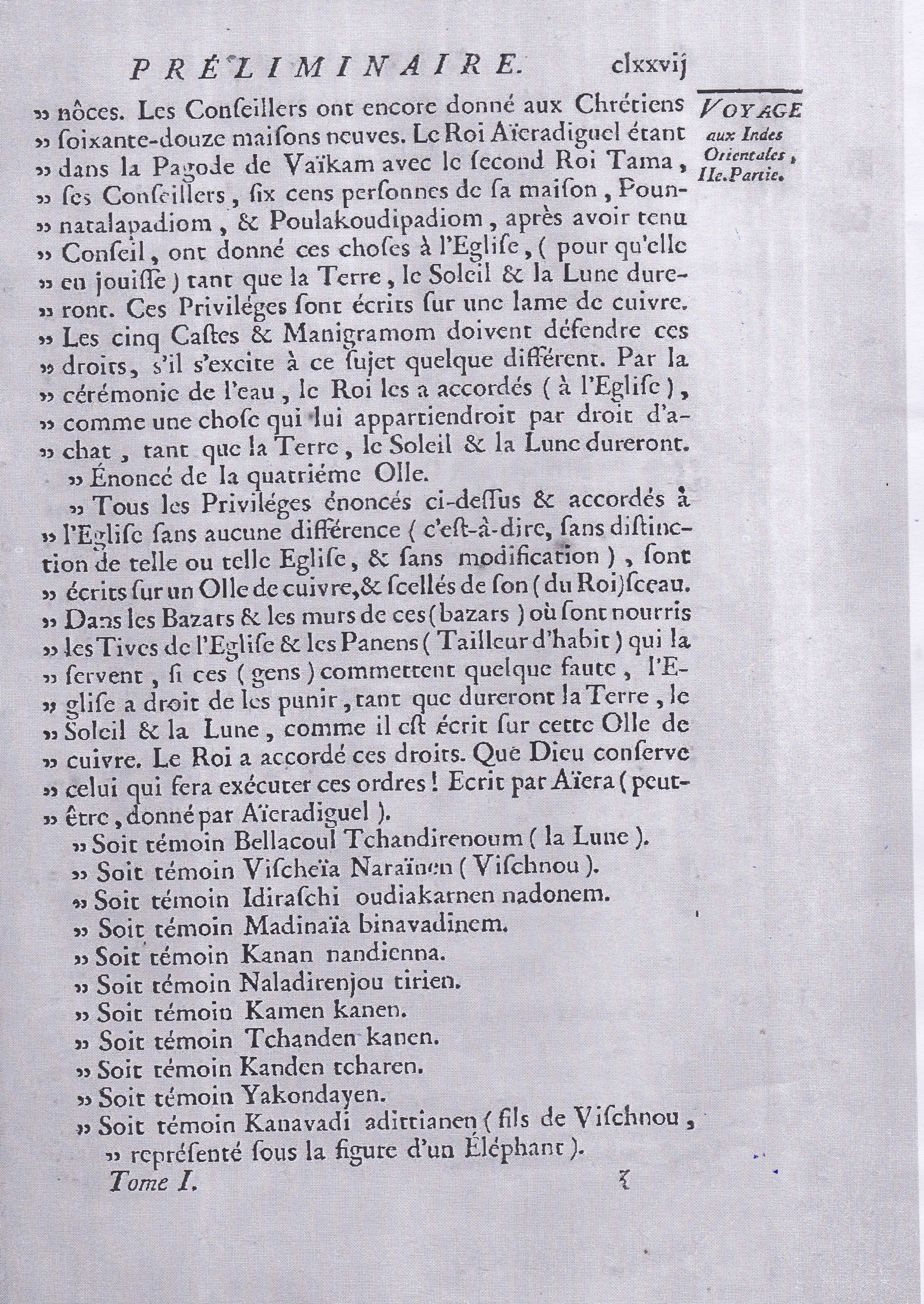

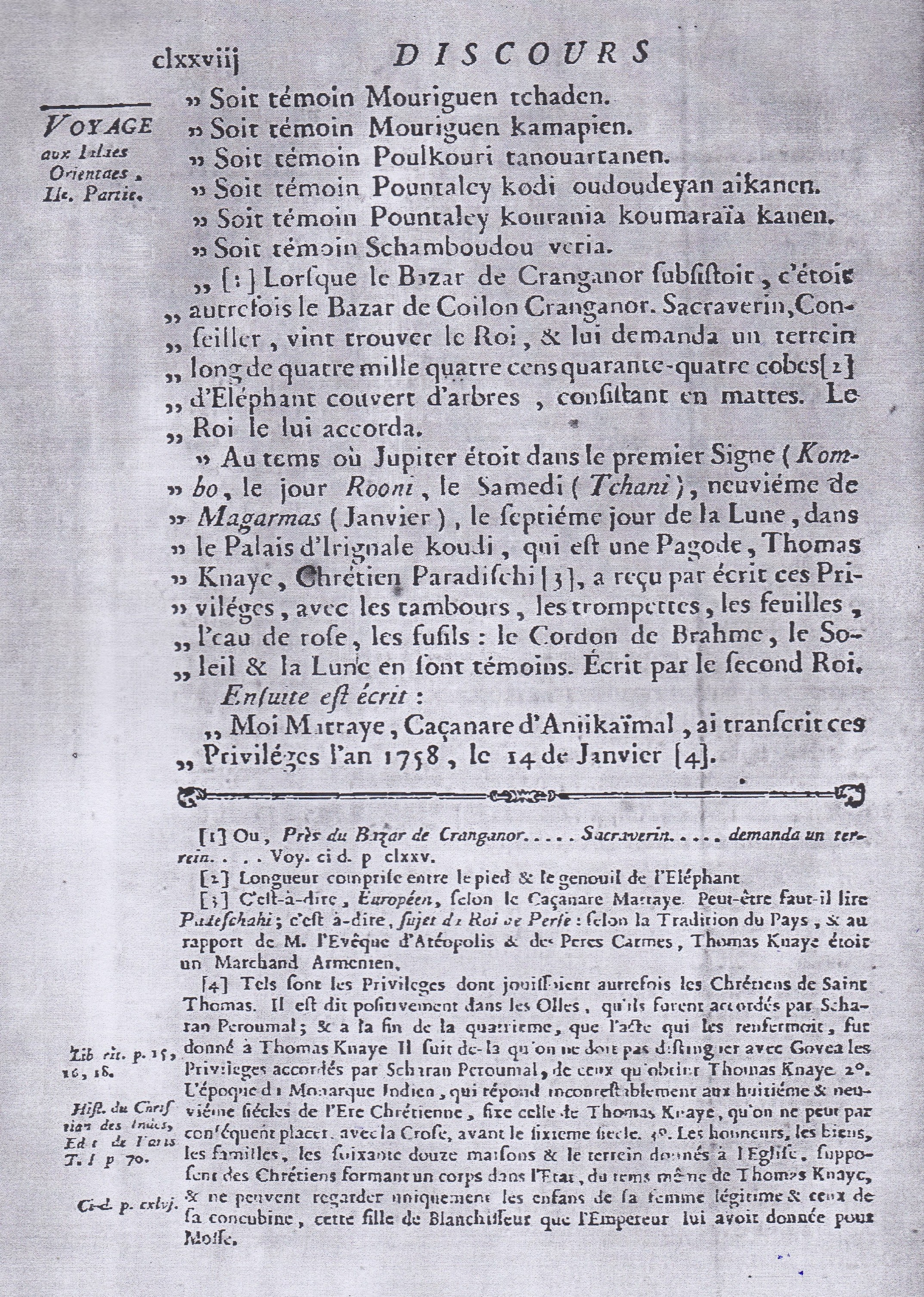

The Quilon grant and the Thomas of Cana grant were originally issued as separate copper plate inscriptions but were later re-engraved together as a unified set on six plates. In this combined version, the Thomas of Cana text followed directly after the Quilon text on the same plate. When the plates were later divided, the separation was imperfect, causing the beginning of the Thomas of Cana text to become detached from the rest. The Syrian Christians at Kollam retained the first four plates, while the Christian community at Kodungallur held the last two (Thomas of Cana copper plates), which were eventually lost. The fourth plate at Kollam was re-engraved into two parts, and only the first part survives today, with transcripts reconstructing missing portions from the lost section.

== See also ==
- Jewish copper plates of Cochin
- Thomas of Cana copper plates
