= Thomas of Cana copper plates =

Lost set of copper-plate grants from Kerala, India

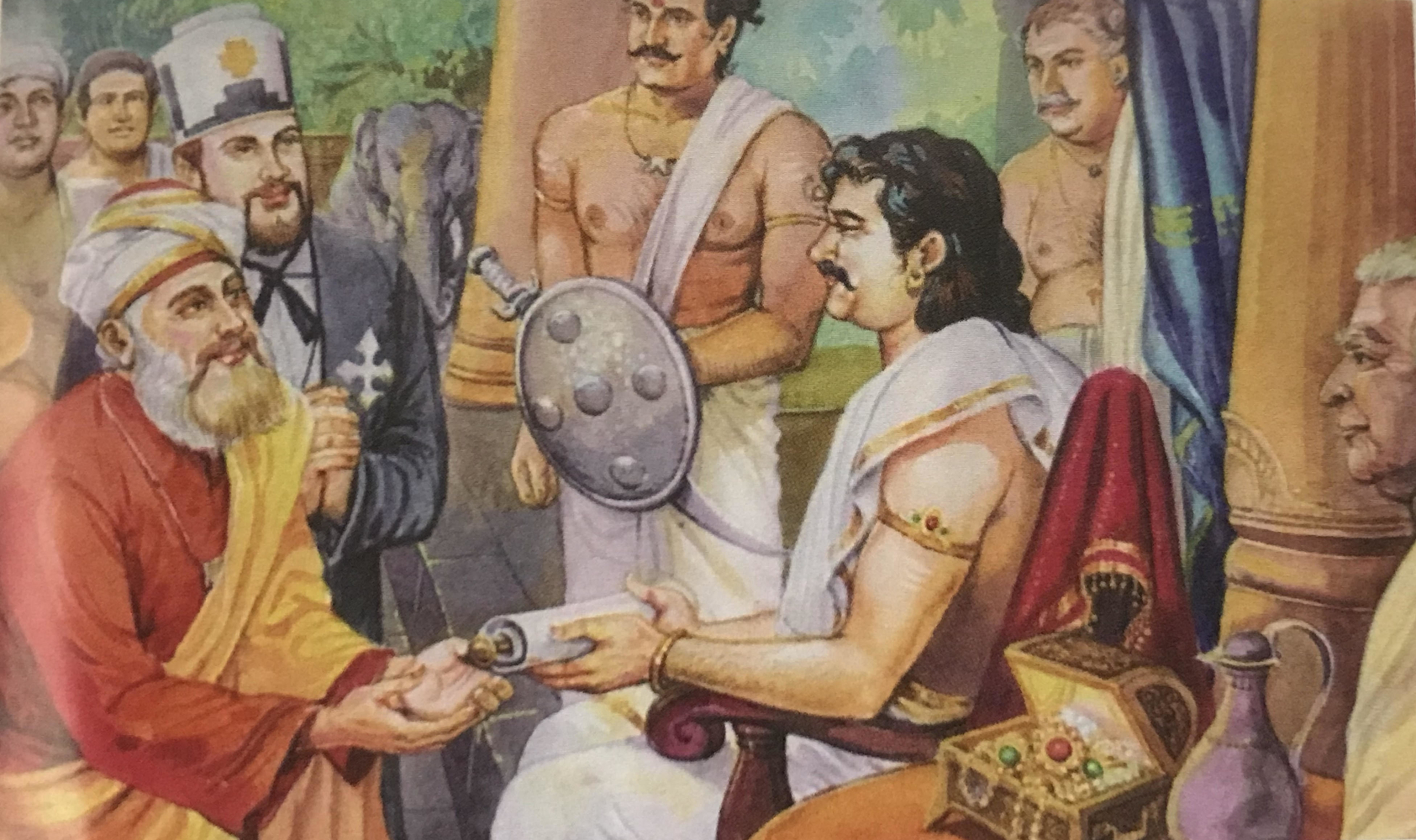
Thomas of Cana Received by Cheraman Perumal

The Thomas of Cana copper plates (Malayalam: Knai Thoma Cheppedu), or Knanaya copper plates, dated variously between 345 C.E. and 811 C.E., are a lost set of copper-plate grants issued by the unidentified Chera/Perumal king of Kerala "Co-qua-rangon" to Syriac Christian merchants led by Knai Thoma (anglicized as Thomas of Cana) in the city of "Makotayar Pattinam" (present day Kodungallur), south India. The royal charters were reportedly engraved in ”Malabar”, syriac and Arabic on both sides of two copper plates (joined by a ring). Archbishop Francis Ros notes in his 1604 account M.S. ADD 9853 that the plates were taken to Portugal by the Franciscan Order.

Scholar M.G.S. Narayanan tentatively identifies king “Co-qua-rangon” with king Rama Rajasekhara (Co-qua-rangon → Ko Kotai Iraman → Rajadhiraja Rama) of the 9th century Chera Empire.

The Knanaya or the people of Knai Thoma were historically associated with the southern portion of the Chera/Perumal headquarters Kodungallur until in 1524 they were dispersed from the city due to conflict between the Kingdom of Cochin and the Kingdom of Calicut. The plate was cherished by the Knanaya as evidence of their arrival in Kerala under the leadership of Knai Thoma as well as a notation of the historical, economic, and social rights bestowed upon them by the Chera Perumal. The native Christian tradition places the arrival of Thomas of Cana in 345 C.E.

Translations of the existing Kollam Syrian Plates of the 9th century made by the Syrian Christian priest Ittimani in 1601 as well as the French Indologist Abraham Anquetil Duperron in 1758 both note that one of the plates mentioned a brief of the arrival of Knai Thoma. It is believed that this was a notation of the previous rights bestowed upon the Christians by Cheraman Perumal. The contemporary set however does not mention this paragraph and is believed to be incomplete or a later inscription. Scholar of Early Christian history István Percvel theorizes that at one time the Kollam Syrian plates and the Thomas of Cana plates were re-engraved together as a single unified grant.

== History ==
=== Origins and traditions ===
The Thomas of Cana copper plates feature heavily in the history and traditions of the Knanaya community in Kerala. According to the community's traditional origins, Thomas of Cana, a Syrian merchant led a group of 72 Jewish-Christian immigrant families, a bishop named Uraha Mar Yausef, and clergymen from the Middle East to settle in Cranganore, India in the 4th century (some sources place these events as late as the 9th century). This event may reflect a historical migration of East Syrian Christians to India around this time, which established the region's relationship with the Church of the East. The Knanaya claim descent from Thomas of Cana and his followers. Elements of the Thomas of Cana story feature in ancient songs as well as the Thomas of Cana copper plates These plates are said to have granted Thomas' followers 72 social, economic, and religious rights from Cheraman Perumal, the Chera king.

=== 16th-17th century records of the plates ===
The first written record of the Thomas of Cana copper plates dates to the 16th century when Portuguese officials in Kerala took notice of the plates and their later disappearance. During this time period the plates were in the possession of Mar Jacob, the Chaldean bishop of the city of Cranganore. Due to an altercation between the Zamorin of Calicut and the Kingdom of Cochin, the homes and churches of the Knanaya community were set aflame and destroyed in 1524. Cranganore had a Knanaya township and three churches namely of St. Mary, St. Kuriakose, and St. Thomas in southern Cranganore which, according to tradition, were built by Thomas of Cana when the community arrived in India. The battle destroyed the entire township and caused the community to disperse from the city to other settlements. The event is noted in the Knanaya folk song "Innu Nee Njangale Kaivitto Marane" or "Have You Forgotten Us Today Oh Lord?". Due to this great calamity Mar Jacob had the plates later deposited with a pawnbroker as security.

In 1566, Portuguese official Damio De Goes records that the Thomas of Cana copper plate grant was given to the Portuguese treasurer Pero De Sequeia by the Chaldean Bishop of Cranganore Mar Jacob in 1549 for safekeeping. Treasurer Pero De Sequeia then took the plates to the Portuguese governor of India Martim Afonso De Sousa who ordered the local people to translate the contents of the plates. To the Governor's dismay, none of the local people could interpret the language of antiquity on the plates. However, the Portuguese eventually came into contact with a Cochin Jewish linguist who De Goes expresses was "versed in many languages".Governor De Sousa sent the plates to the Jewish linguist with orders from the King of Cochin to interpret and translate its contents.

The linguist translated the contents of the plates and stated that they contained social, economic, and religious rights given to Thomas of Cana by a local ruler and were written in three languages, namely "Chaldean, Malabar, and Arabic". De Goes notes that physically the plates were "of fine metal each one palm and a half long and four fingers broad, written on both sides, and strung together at the top with a thick copper wire".The Cochin Jew returned the plates to the Portuguese, who then had his Malayalam description of the plates translated to the Portuguese language in a written copy. This copy was later sent by treasurer Pero De Sequeia to Portuguese King John III. After this point of time, the physical plates were kept by Pero De Sequeia and his successor as treasures at the Portuguese depot in Cochin. The account of De Sequeia and translation of the plates are found in the Portuguese work Decada VII as well as some other Portuguese works.

In 1602 Portuguese priest Fr. Antonio De Gouvea notes that the Thomas of Cana copper plate grant which had been kept safe at the Portuguese factory of Cochin was by this point lost due to the "carelessness" of the Portuguese themselves. De Gouvea states that the loss of the plates had greatly angered the Knanaya, who had no other written record of their history and rights to defend themselves from local kings who by this point were infringing on their position.

In 1603–1604 Archbishop Francis Ros made a more complete translation of the context of the Thomas of Cana copper plate grant from an existing olla copy (palm-leaf manuscript). The physical manuscript of Ros' Portuguese translation is archived at the British Library as title MS. Add. 9853. Ros notes also that the plates were taken to Portugal by Franciscans.

The final record of the plates comes from the official historian of Portuguese India Diogo do Couto in 1611. Do Couto claims to have seen the plates and makes an incomplete translation of its content. De Couto's translation can be found in his text Decada XII.

== Early sources ==
A number of 16th and early 17th century sources from the Portuguese era record witnessing and or physically handling the plates. Examples of such are seen in the following works:

- Portuguese Treasurer Damio De Goes: Cronica Do Felicissimo Rei D.Manuel. (1566).
- Jesuit Priest Fr. Francis Dionisio: "On the Christians of St. Thomas" (1578). Published in Documenta Indica. Vol XII. Fr. Wicki S.J.
- Augustinian Priest Fr. Antonio De Gouvea: Jornada do Arcebispo Goa Dom Frey Alexyo de Menezes. (1606).
- Jesuit Bishop Francisco Ros: MS.ADD. 9853. (1604). British Museum Library.
- Portuguese Historian Diogo Do Couto: Decadas da Asia. Decada XII. Book III. (1611).

== Content of the plates ==
According to the account of De Goes the plates contained social, economic, and religious rights given to Thomas of Cana by a local ruler and were written in three languages, namely "Chaldean, Malabar, and Arabic". The following summary of the plates was recorded by Archbishop Francis Ros in 1603–1604 according to an existing palm-leaf manuscript copy:

"Before the full moon, the same king Coquarangon being in Carnelur, there arrived in a ship Thomas Caneneo, a chief man, who had resolved to see the uttermost part of the East, and some men, seeing him as he arrived, went to inform the king. And the king himself came and saw and called said chief man Thomas and he disembarked and came before the king who spoke graciously to him; and to honor him he gave him in surname his own name, calling him Coquarangon Caneneo. And he received this honor from the king and went to rest in his place. And the king gave him the city of Magoderpatanam forever. And the said king, being in his great prosperity, went one day to hunt in the forest, and the same king surrounded the whole forest and he called in haste for Thomas, who came and stood before the king in a lucky hour, and the king questioned the soothsayer. And the king afterwards spoke to Thomas saying that he would build a city in that forest. And he answered to the king first making reverence and said: "I desire this forest for myself". And the king granted it to him and gave it forever. And at once, the next day he cleared the forest and cast his eyes on it in the same year, on the eleventh of April, and gave it as an inheritance to Thomas at the time and day aforesaid, in the King's name, who laid the first brick for the church and for the house of Thomas Caneneo, and made there a city for all (of them) and entered the church and there made prayer the same day. After these things, Thomas himself went to the king's palaces and offered him presents, and afterwards he asked the king to give that land to him and to his descendants; and he measured two hundred and sixty-four elephant cubits, and gave them to Thomas and his descendants for ever: and the same time seventy-two houses which immediately were erected there, and gardens, and trees with their enclosures, and with their paths and boundaries and inner yards. And he granted him seven kinds of musical instruments, and all the honors, and to speak and walk like a king and that at the weddings the women might give a certain signal with their finger to their mouth, and he granted him distinct weight, and to adorn the ground with cloths, and he granted them royal fans and to double the sandal (mark) on the arm, and a tent and a royal canopy in every part of the kingdom for ever, and besides five tributes to Thomas, and to his lineage, and to his confederates, for men, and for women, and for all his relatives, and to the children of his law for ever. The said king gave it in his name"

Witnesses:

- Condaxeril Canden
- Cherucaraprota Chaten (The King's Chief Door-Keeper)
- Areunden Conden (The King's Councillor)
- Amenate Counden Guerulen (Captain of the Army)
- Chirumalaprota Tirivicramen Comeren (Councillor of the East Side of Malabar)
- Peruala Ata Aditen (Singer of the King)
- Perubalanata Cottoeoude (Guard of the Kings Port)
- Bichremen Chinguende Carturte (King's Chamberlain)
- Araniperumoouil (Scribe of the King)

== Translation by Duperron ==
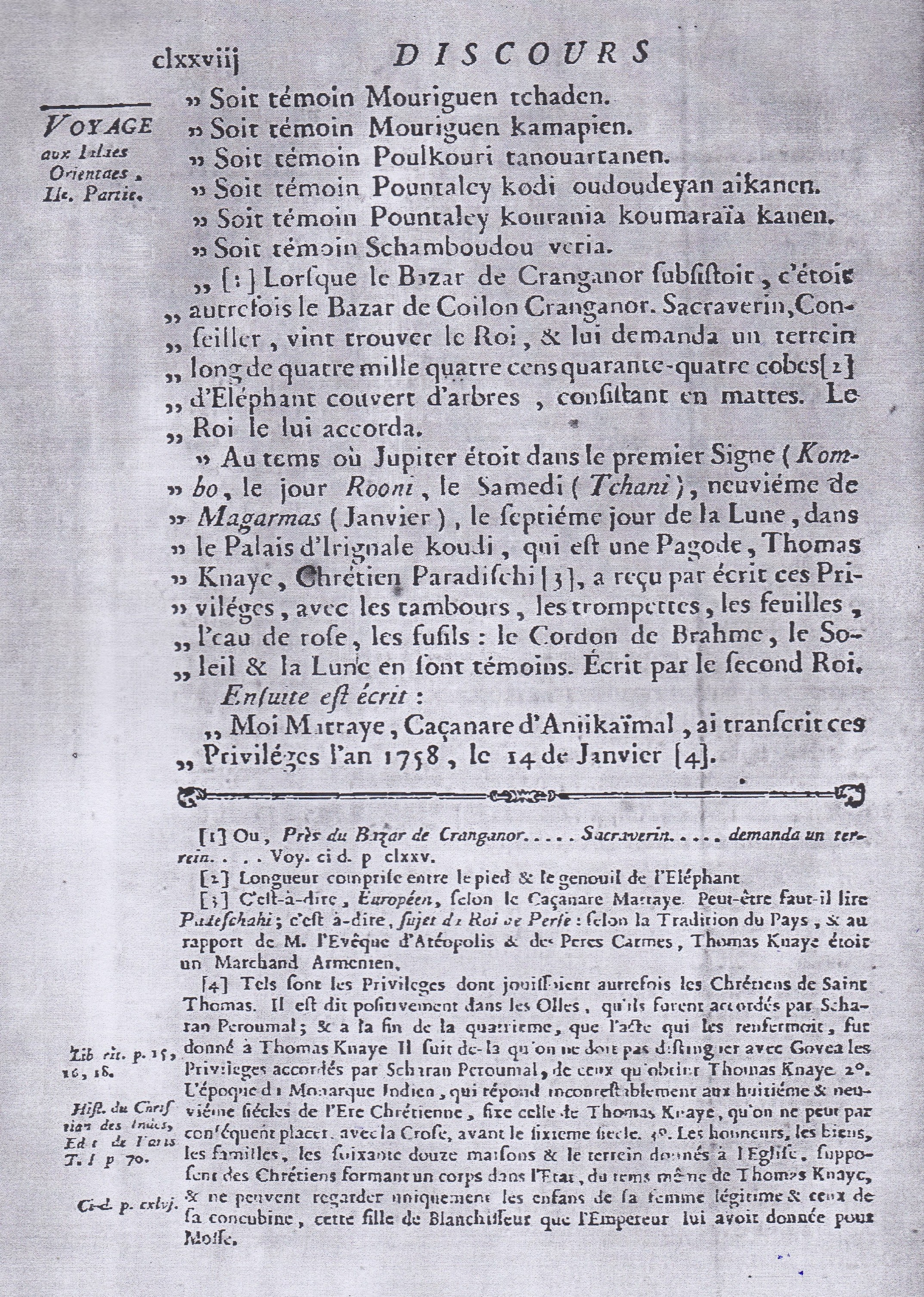
Du Perron's Translation Mentioning Thomas of Cana (1758)

Translations of the Kollam Syrian Plates made by the Syrian Christian priest Ittimani in 1601 as well as the French Indologist Abraham Anquetil Duperron in 1758 both note that the fourth plate mentioned a brief of the arrival of Thomas of Cana.It is believed that this was a notation of the previous rights bestowed upon the Christians by Cheraman Perumal. The contemporary fourth plate however does not mention this paragraph and is believed to be a later copy. Scholar of Early Christian history Istavan Percvel theorizes that at one time the Kollam Syrian plates and the Thomas of Cana copper plates were re-engraved together.

=== Text of the Brief ===
1758 translation by Indologist Abraham Duperron:

“The History of the founding of the Town of Cranganore when Pattanam was the city, (he) visited, revered and requested the Emperor and the Minister at Kolla Kodungalloor for a marsh where thickets grow. Measured by Anakol (elephant kol) 4,444 kols of land was granted in the year of the Jupiter in Kubham, on the 29th of Makaram, 31 the Saturday, Rohini and Saptami (7th day of the moon),' the palace, great temple and school at Irinjalakuda also were founded. The same day that place was called Makothevar pattanam (the town of the Great God), and it was made the city (capital). From there privileges such as drawbridge at gates, ornamented arches, mounted horse with two drums, cheers, conch blowing, salutes were granted in writing to the Christian foreigner called Knaye Thoma with sacred threat and libation of water and flower. The sun and the moon are witnesses to this. Written to the kings of all times.”

== Culture surrounding the plates ==
=== Knanaya community ===
The Thomas of Cana copper plates are a common feature in the culture, traditions, and history of the Knanaya community. The historical context of the plates and the 72 privileges bestowed to Knai Thoma are especially found in the ancient folk songs of the Knanaya first written down in the 17th century on palm leaf manuscripts. The texts of the palm leaves were compiled and published in 1910 by the Knanaya scholar P.U. Luke in his text Puratana Pattukal, or Ancient Songs. The songs were written in Old Malayalam but contain diction and lexemes from Sanskrit, Syriac, and Tamil indicating their antiquity.

An example of the folk song culture related to the plates can be seen in the song Munnam Malankara:

When of yore to immigrate to Malankara. The gentlemen Tomman Kinan essayed – Verily
The King's sons belonging to seventy-two families. These good citizens, hundred, embarked by the grace of the Catholicos – Verily
The foreigner who came entered Cranganore. He entered, and when he visited the Chera King, in plenty he presented gold and coral and pearls and obtained the country.
He came, at an auspicious time endeavored, and gained hi end. – Verily
That his greatness may be manifest in all the world around, he gave him marks of honour – the fivefold band, the eighteen castes.
The horn, the flute, the peacock feather fan, the conch, the canopy, – Verily
The gold crown and all other good ornaments. He gave him marks of honour: the walking-cloth, the day-time lamp,
The seven kinds of royal musical instruments, and three lingua cheers. – Verily
Drums and lingual cheers and all good pomp, the king with pleasure gave,
And all these did Tomman Kinan accept – Verily
He got also the copper-plate deed fittingly engraved. The marks of honour which the Kings King gave.
Last for all the days of the existence of the sun and the moon – Verily
For all the days of the existence of the sun and moon.

=== Hindu bards ===
Besides the Knanaya community, culture surrounding the Thomas of Cana copper plates is also examined among the Hindu bards of Kerala known as Panans. Panans would historically visit the homes of nobles castes in Kerala and sing songs of heroic figures as well as legendary events. After doing so the Panan would receive payment for their performance in the form of a material donation of items such as betel leaves and other types of charitable aid. Likewise, the Panans would visit the homes of the Knanaya and sing songs of the communities history and heritage. In particular, the Panans would sing of a story in the life of Thomas of Cana during the reign of Cheraman Perumal. The story is narrated from the perspective of the leader of the bards known as Tiruvaranka Panan. The contents of the story revolves around a mission bestowed to Tiruvaranka by Thomas of Cana in which he is to travel to Ezhathunadu (Sri Lanka) and implore four castes, namely carpenters, blacksmiths, goldsmiths, and molders, to return to Cranganore which they had left due to an infringement on their social traditions. The four castes are initially hesitant to return to Cranganore but are persuaded by Tiruvaranka when he shows them the golden staff of Thomas of Cana which he was granted to take on his journey as a sign of goodwill. After seeing the staff the four castes are content and in their satisfaction remove their own ornaments and smelt a golden crown for Thomas of Cana which they present to him upon their return to the Cranganore. Wearing the crown, Thomas and Tiruvarankan go to meet Cheraman Perumal who is pleased with the success of their mission and grants Thomas of Cana privileges. The remainder of the song sings of the seventy-two historical privileges bestowed upon Thomas.

== See also ==
- Quilon Syrian copper plates (mid-9th century AD)
- Jewish copper plates of Cochin (c. 1000 AD)
- Viraraghava copper plates (1225 AD)

== Bibliography ==
- Baum, Wilhelm; Winkler, Dietmar W. (2003). The Church of the East: A Concise History. Routledge. ISBN 0-415-29770-2.
- Gamliel, Ophira (April 2009). Jewish Malayalam Women's Songs (PDF) (PhD). Hebrew University.
- Jussay, P. M. (2005). The Jews of Kerala. Calicut: Publication division, University of Calicut.
- Karukaparambil, George (2005). Marganitha Kynanaitha: Knanaya Pearl. Deepika Book House. ASIN B076GCH274.
- Kollaparambil, Jacob (2015). Sources of the Syro Malabar Law. Oriental Institute of Religious Studies India. ISBN 9789382762287.
- King, Daniel (2018). The Syriac World. Routledge Press. ISBN 9781138899018.
- Luke, P.U. (1911). Ancient Songs. Jyothi Book House.
- Narayanan, M.G.S (2018). Perumals of Kerala. Cosmo Books. ISBN 978-8193368329.
- Neill, Stephen (2004). A History of Christianity in India: The Beginnings to AD 1707. Cambridge University Press. ISBN 0-521-54885-3.
- Swiderski, Richard Michael (1988a). "Northists and Southists: A Folklore of Kerala Christians". Asian Folklore Studies. 47 (1). Nanzan University: 73–92. doi:10.2307/1178253. JSTOR 1178253.
- Swiderski, Richard Michael (1988b). Blood Weddings: The Knanaya Christians of Kerala. Madras: New Era. ISBN 9780836424546.
- Thodathil, James (2005). Antiquity and Identity of the Knanaya Community. Knanaya Clergy Association. ASIN B000M1CEDI.
- Vellian, Jacob (1990). Crown, Veil, Cross: Marriage Rights. Syrian Church Series. Vol. 15. Anita Printers. OCLC 311292786.
- Vellian, Jacob (1990). Knanite Community: History and Culture. Vol. 17. Jyothi Book House. OCLC 50077436.
- Vellian, Jacob (1986). Symposium on Knanites. Syrian Church Series. Vol. 12. Jyothi Book House.
