= Periyapattinam Jewish Inscription =

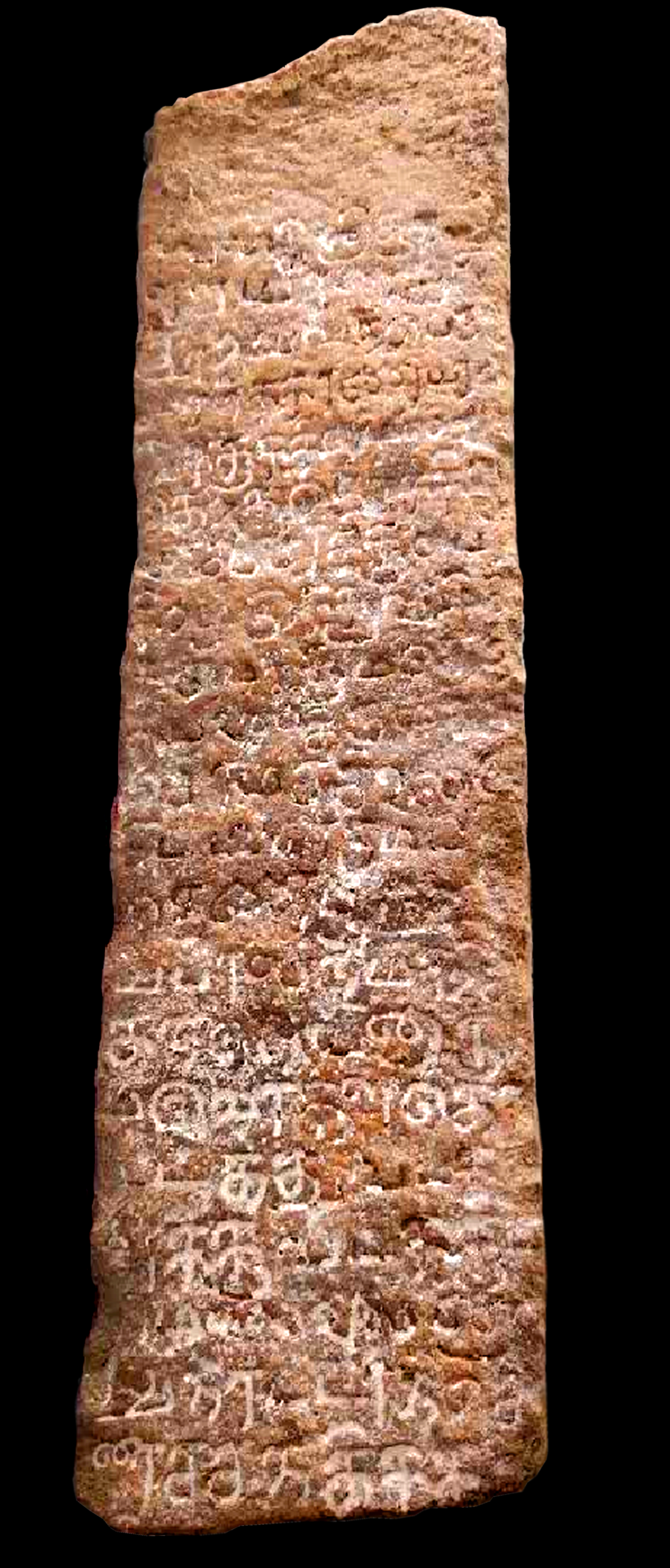
- Material: Stone
- Writing: Tamil Script
- Created: c. 1200-1250 AD
- Discovered: Valantaravai
- Language: Tamil

Periyapattinam Jewish Inscription (c.13th century AD), also Valantaravai inscription, is a medieval merchant guild inscription discovered from near Valantaravai, Ramanathapuram in Tamil Nadu in southern India. The record was originally installed on the Periyapattinam beach.

The epigraph mentions details of the land donated to certain 'Cutapalli' ('the Jewish Synagogue') at Periyapattinam. It is one of the rare records mentioning early Jewish, Christian and Muslim presence in southern India. and dates to the period of ascendancy of the Ainnutruvar or Ayyavole Five Hundred merchant guild in south India (incorporating manigramam and anjuvannam).

The settlement of 'Peryapatnam' is traditionally listed as one of the first Jewish settlements in southern India. An undated Hebrew language inscription was previously found at Periyapattinam. The Valantaravai record incidentally mentions certain "tarisapalli" or the Christian church (similar to the Quilon Syrian copper plates from Kerala). A tombstone with a Hebrew inscription was found in an unused well in a coconut farm near Periyapattinam in 2024. The marker is dated in multiple eras (including Shvat 1536/1537 of the Seleucid era, corresponding to 1224/1225 AD).

== Material and contents ==
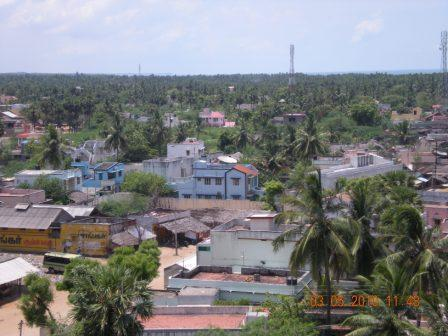
Periyapattinam

The record is inscribed on the four sides of a stone pillar (3 feet x 1 foot) in Tamil language (21+14+15+[...]). The characters on the last side are illegible. The inscription (undated) can be paleographically dated to c. 1200-1250 AD. The stone pillar (bearing the inscription) was originally situated on the Periyapattinam beach.

The inscription begins with the traditional invocation 'Swasti Sri' ('Hail Prosperity'). It mentions details of the land donated to certain 'Cutapalli' ('the Jewish Synagogue') alias 'Ainnutruvar Perumpalli' ('the Great Synagogue of the Ainnutruvar Merchant Guild').

The boundaries of the land or plot donated to the synagogue in Periyapattinam are also described.

- On the eastern border — 'Valaiceri' and the 'Mutucku Vali'
- On the southern border — the 'garden lands' of Tirumutuccolacilai Cettiyar, 'Patinenpumi' (the Eighteen Countries) Ceyapalan and Kuttan Tevanar.
- On the western border —
  1. 'Nalunattani' (the Nanadesi) Conaccanti
  2. Sri-cola-perunteru (street)
  3. Wall or matil of the tarisapalli (the Christian church)
  4. The pilarppalli (the Muslim mosque)
  5. The southern wall of the tarisapalli

== Discovery and context ==
The record was discovered by P. Satish, analysed by V. Rajaguru, president, Ramanathapuram Archaeological Research Foundation, and deciphered by epigraphist S. Rajagopal. The stones from the Periyapattinam beach were brought to Valantaravai in the 1940s to construct sidewall of a well. The stone was being used for washing cloths at the time of the discovery (2022).

=== Context ===
The settlement of 'Peryapatnam', along with 'Madayi' (in northern Kerala) and 'Cherigandaram' (unidentified), was listed as one of the first Jewish settlements on the Malabar Coast [sic] by Mosseh Pereyra De Paiva, a Portuguese Jewish trader from Amsterdam, in 1686, based on information he received from his interlocutors at Cochin. The 'Peryapatnam' of the Jewish traditions was previously identified with Pattanam near Cranganore.

An undated Hebrew language inscription was previously found on a gravestone of certain "Mariam, daughter of David", at Periyapattinam. The record also contained a prayer for the peace of the soul. The slab was later moved to the office of the Samsthanam Revenue officer, Ramnad (and is now lost). A donative record of Maravarma Sundara Pandya to the pilarpalli or the Periyapattinam Jalal Jamal Mosque can be found at the Thirupullani Temple.

== See also ==
- Jewish copper plates of Cochin (11th century)
- Viraraghava copper plates of Cochin (13th century)
- Quilon Syrian copper plates (9th century)
