= Thomas of Cana =

4th century Syriac merchant who came to Kerala, India

Saint Thomas of Cana
- Late 16th Century Sunken Relief Carving of K’nai Thoma at Saint Mary’s Greater Church, Kaduthuruthy, Kerala, India
- Venerated in: Syriac Orthodox Church; Knanaya Community
- Canonized: 6 March 1990 by Ignatius Zakka I was Patriarch
- Feast: 36th day (Sixth Sunday) of the Great Lent (Syriac Orthodox Church)
- Influenced: Saint Thomas Christians

Thomas of Cana (Malayalam: K'nāi Thoma or Tomman Kinān, Syriac: K'nānāya Thoma) was a Syriac Christian merchant magnate who arrived to the Chera Dynasties capital city of Kodungallur between 345 A.D. and 811 A.D. Thoma brought with him Jewish-Christian families (early East Syriac Christian merchants) and clergymen from Persian Mesopotamia.

Thoma received copper-plates of socio-economic rights known today as the Thomas of Cana copper plates. The descendants of Thoma and the migrants who arrived with him are known as the Knanaya or Tekkumbhagar (Southist) Christians, found among the Saint Thomas Christian community of Kerala, India. Scholars associate Thoma's migration with connecting the Church of Saint Thomas in India with the East Syriac liturgical tradition of the Persian Church of the East

Portuguese sources of the 17th century note that due to Thoma's deeds as a Christian merchant, the native Nasrani of Kodungallur venerated him as a saint. Thoma was officially canonized by the patriarch of the Syriac Orthodox Church, Ignatius Zakka I, in March 1990.

== Epithet of Thomas ==
The meaning of the Cana epithet is unclear; it may refer to the town of Cana or the land of Canaan in the Bible, or it may be a corruption of a Syriac term for merchant (Knāyil in Malayalam). However, scholar Richard M. Swiderski states that none of these etymologies are entirely sound.

Scholar Dr. Jacob Kollaparambil argues that the "Cana" form is a corruption formalized by European scholars in the 18th century based on the Malayalam form Knāi and its variants (Kynāi, Kinān) found in the folk tradition of the Knanaya and the common parlance and literature of the people of Malabar. This may be a reference to the Christian community of Kynai, in Bét Aramayé in Persia (Southern Mesopotamia).

=== Thoma the "Armenian” ===
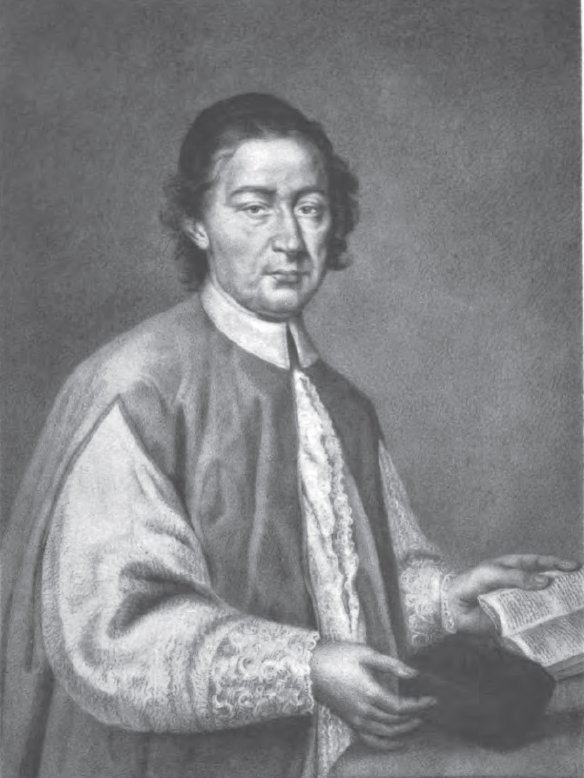
JS Assemani

A number of Portuguese era sources labeled Knai Thoma as a Syriac Christian in religion but “Armenian” in nationality. In the 18th century Lebanese scholar J.S. Assemani expressed that the Portuguese likely interpreted the term Aramean (another term for Aramaic or Syriac Christian) as Armenian and dubbed him as such.

Scholar Dr. Jacob Kollaparambil notes that while Assemani's rationale is plausible a more concrete explanation may be associated with the fact that many of the East Syriac Christian bishops who arrived to Kerala in the 15th and 16th century such as Mar Yohannan, Mar Thomas, and Mar Jacob Abuna were originally citizens of the territory known as Greater Armenia in the Middle East. The Portuguese labeled these bishops as citizens of Armenia in their own writings as well. Dr. Jacob Kollaparambil notes that because the Portuguese associated the East Syriac bishops in Kerala with Armenia, out of their own ignorance they likely extended this same nationality to Knai Thoma as well.

=== Thoma the "Bishop” ===
In the native traditions of Kerala as well as the early 16/17th century recordings during the Portuguese era, Thomas of Cana is always noted as a merchant.

Lebanese scholar J.S. Assemani argued that Thomas of Cana was a 9th-century bishop, published in his text “Bibliotecha Orientalis” (1719-1728). In an attempt to trace Thomas’ origins, Assemani labeled Thomas of Cana as Bishop Thomas of Hadud, a 9th-century Nestorian bishop. Historian Dr. Jacob Kollaparambil calls Assemani's assertion a “counterfeit” creation not in line with earlier source work and native tradition.

== History ==
=== Medieval Era ===
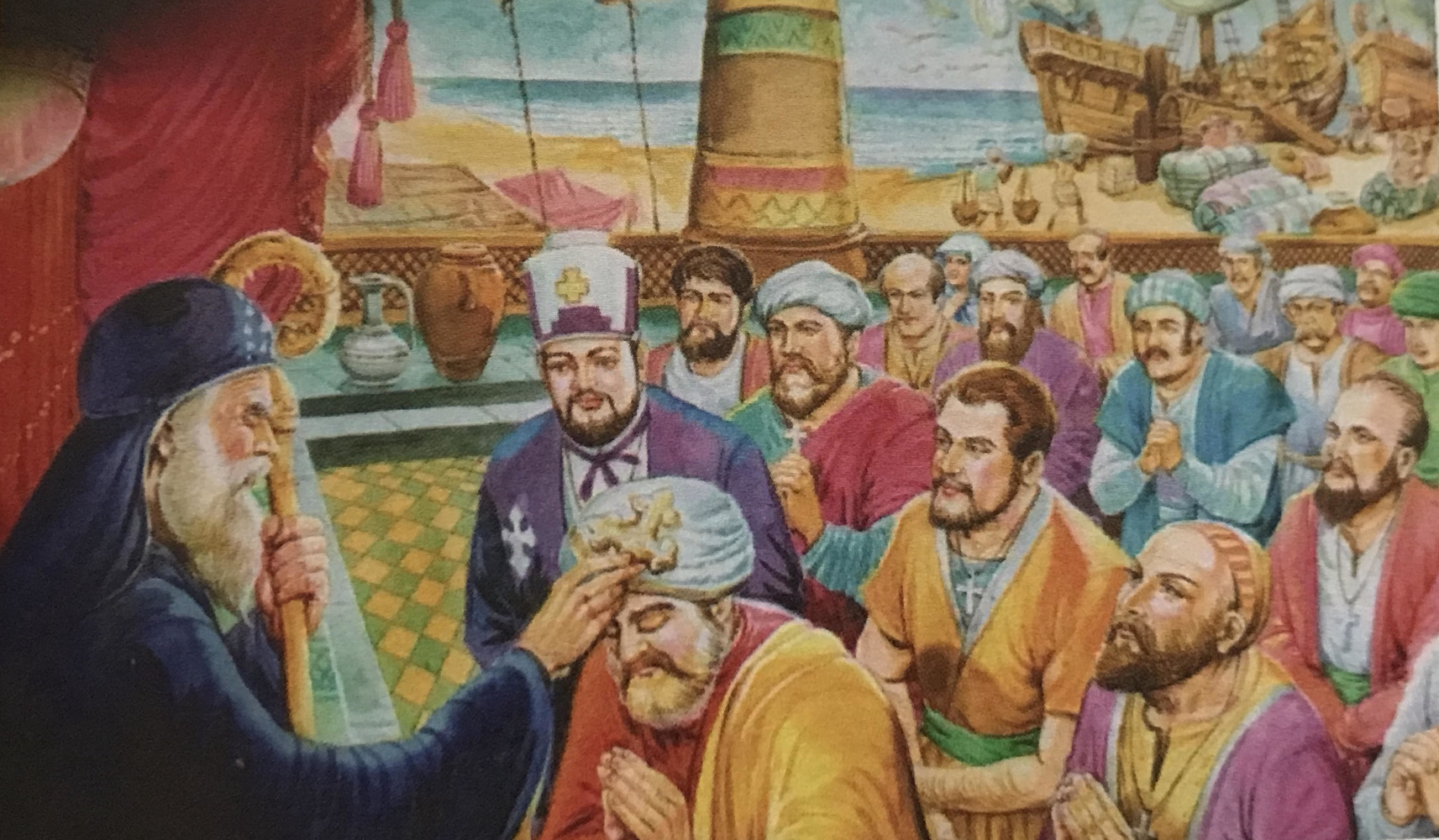
Thomas of Cana and the Knanaya depart for India

The existing native tradition places Thomas’ arrival in 345 A.D.; Reports by colonial officials give varying dates from 345 to 811 A.D. Thomas is said to have been a Syrian merchant, distinct from Thomas the Apostle, who preceded him in evangelizing in India. According to the traditions, Thomas of Cana led a group of 72 families, as well as clergymen, to the port city of Kodungallur in the Malabar coast. There they met and supplemented the Saint Thomas Christians, who had been evangelized by Thomas the Apostle in the 1st century.

Thomas was granted a copper-plate grant by the Chera Dynasty which gave his party and all native Christians socio-economic privileges. The Thomas of Cana copper plates are noted to have existed in Kerala until the 17th century, after which point they were lost. The Kollam Syrian plates of the 9th century historically mentioned a brief of the arrival of Knai Thoma.

Scholars state the arrival of Thomas of Cana reflects a historical migration of East Syriac Christians to India. This may have been the era in which the region's relationship with the Church of the East developed. Stephen Neill suggests that East Syriac Christians may have come to India specifically because there was already an established Christian community, to whom they imparted East Syriac traditions.

Historian Dr. Benedict Vadakkekara notes that the arrival of Thoma and the Knanaya community was not only a turning point for the St. Thomas Christians, but also exhibits that the native Christians were not entirely isolated from foreign Christian centers:

“Related with East Syriac Church: The spatial separateness of the St Thomas Christians from Christian centres in other lands was not in every way absolute, as at an early stage of their history they found themselves in rapport with the East Syriac Church. Neither their traditions nor their posterior documents exhibit any sign of constraint or bad blood occasioned by such a relationship. On the other hand everything goes to show that it was a happy working arrangement. Their being in dire straits early on in their history and the arrival on the scene of the progenitors of the present-day "Southists" as benefactors, appears to coincide with the Community's acceptance of fellowship with the East Syriac Church.”

==== Syrian Christian Township at Kodungallur ====
Through his copper plate grant, Thoma is noted to have acquired for the Christians land in Kodungallur upon which a church dedicated to Thomas the Apostle was built. It is noted that the native St. Thomas Christians had inhabited the northern side of Kodungallur centuries before the arrival of Thoma, while the Knanaya arrived and inhabited the southern side.

Evidence of this township first emerged in the 14th century, when Zacharias, a young deacon of St. Kuriakose Church wrote a summary of the Church of Malabar and its relationship to the Church of the East archived today as Vatican Syrian Codex 22, the oldest surviving Syriac manuscript from India.

Subsequent sources of the township are exhibited in 16th-17th century Portuguese records. In 1578, missionary Francisco Dionysio noted that the St. Thomas Church built by Knai Thoma was still in existence and was currently in the possession of the Portuguese:

"After that came a Christian by name Quinai Thoma, native of Babylon, a merchant, who disembarked at Cranganor and began negotiating his merchandise. Being rich and known in the country, he became a friend of the King of Cranganor who gave him a plot of land of 500 square yards to build a Church in honour of St. Thomas, which is the one the Portuguese now have." - Francisco Dionisio (1578), Amario Jesuitico, cod. 28, ff.34-38

Decades later in 1604, Francisco Ros, a Catholic bishop in Kerala, noted that he had read in old Chaldean texts in Kerala about the existence of the three churches of Kodungallur built by Knai Thoma:

..."I found written at the end how the said book was made and written at Cranganore, where it says there were three churches, one of St. Thomas, another of Our Lady, and another of St. Cyriac" - Francisco Ros (1604), MS. ADD. 9853. British Museum Library

==== Northist and Southist ====
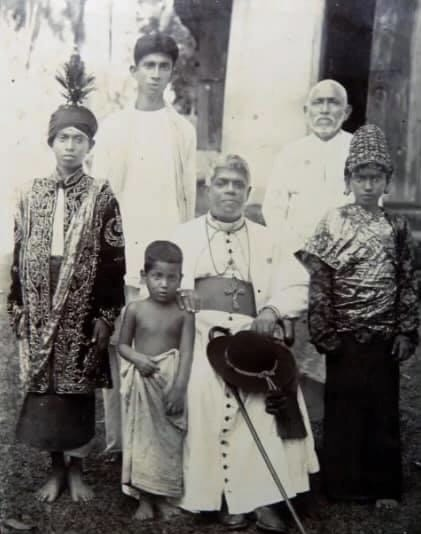
Knanaya in Ceremonial Attire 1924

A number of Portuguese authors noted the existing ethnic division of the Syrian Christians of Kerala as the majority St. Thomas Christians or Vadakkumbhagar (Northist) and the minority Knanaya or Thekkumbhagar (Southist). These designations traditionally associate the Northist as early converts of St. Thomas the Apostle in India and the Southist as the migrants who arrived with Thomas of Cana. Additionally, the designations are in reference to the Chera Empire's capital city of Kodungallur: the Thomas Christians having initially lived on its northern side and the Knanaya having arrived and settled on its southern side. The Oxford History of the Christian Church states the following about the division:

"In time, Jewish Christians of the most exclusive communities descended from settlers who accompanied Knayil Thomma (Kanayi) became known as ‘Southists’ (Tekkumbha ̄gar)...They distinguished between themselves and ‘Northists’ (Vatakkumbha ̄gar). The ‘Northists’, on the other hand, claimed direct descent from the very oldest Christians of the country, those who had been won to Christ by the Apostle Thomas himself. They had already long inhabited northern parts of Kodungallur. They had been there even before various waves of newcomers had arrived from the Babylonian or Mesopotamian provinces of Sassanian Persia." - Historian of South Asian Studies Dr. Robert E. Frykenberg (2010)

Some Portuguese authors also associated the division of Northist and Southist to the two wives of Thomas of Cana. These versions generally present the Southern wife as a Syrian woman and the Northern as a native St. Thomas Christian woman. Additionally they portray one wife as superior and the other inferior and their children as legitimate or illegitimate. In 1579, Fr. Antonio Monserratte, a missionary in Kerala wrote that the stories associated with the two-wives legend were the “lie of the land”. In 1611, Archbishop Francisco Ros, a Latin Catholic clergymen in Kerala, called the two-wives legend a "fable" and instead accounts the division to some Christians descending from the missionary work of St. Thomas the Apostle and others from Knai Thoma.

Syrian Christian scholars generally view the two-wives stories as odious, stating that they emerged due to ethnic and or socio-economic tension between the St. Thomas Christians and the Knanaya. Scholar Dr. Mathias Mundadan expresses the following about the two-wives legend:

“Other details of each version and the reciprocal imputations as legitimate and illegitimate children of Thomas Cana might have been invented to express the odium and hatred each community bore against the other” - Sixteenth Century Traditions of St. Thomas Christians (Mundadan, 1970)

=== 16th century ===
Written accounts of Knai Thoma date to the India's Portuguese period.

Alvarado Penteado: In 1518, the Portuguese missionary Alvaro Penteado wrote a letter to the King of Portugal describing the traditions and origins of the Christians of Kerala. After giving an account of the arrival of St. Thomas the Apostle to India, Penteado notes that the Christians of Kodungallur descend from two quarrelling sons of an "Armenian" merchant, hinting at the ethnic division of the Christian community as Northist and Southist. Penteado notes that Knai Thoma made his first son the "patron and inheritor" of his lands and incomes while he made his second son the "administrator of justice" to the pagan men and women whom he had converted to Christianity. Furthermore Penteado expresses that the Christians of Quilon (Kollam) do not descend from the merchant. Penteado's account is archived as CVR. No. 164. at Arquivo Nacional da Torre do Tombo, Lisbon.

Mar Jacob Abuna: In 1525, Mar Jacob Abuna, a Chaldean bishop in Kerala, wrote a letter to the King of Portugal requesting his aid after Kodungallur had been destroyed during a battle between the Kingdom of Kochi and the Kingdom of Kozhikode in 1524. Mar Jacob notes that the Christians were in an impoverished position and that there churches and homes had been burnt down. Abuna states that the Christians have a copper plate grant (the Thomas of Cana copper plates) which gave them "power to pronounce sentence of death and all other rights". Abuna's letter is archived as ANTT -CVR. No. 99, later published by Fr. Silva Rego in the text Documentao India II (1949).

Abuna: In 1533 Portuguese King John III ordered thirteen witnesses to give testimony on the tomb of St. Thomas the Apostle in Mylapore, India. Among the witnesses was a Chaldean bishop known by his title of Abuna. After giving an account on the arrival and martyrdom of St. Thomas in India, Abuna mentions the arrival of the merchant "Thomas Canane". He states that Thomas Canane went to Kodungallur and bought land there upon which he built a church, which Abuna states is "still standing" today. Furthermore, Abuna notes that Thomas Canane died from an illness and was buried at Kodungallur. Abuna's testimony is preserved at Archivum Romanum Societas Iesu as document Goa 31, ff.18-19.

Damio De Goes: In 1566, Portuguese official Damiao De Goes recounts the information given to him by treasurer of the Portuguese Depot of Cochin Pero De Sequeira on the Thomas of Cana copper plate grant. De Sequeria states that the copper plates were in the possession of Mar Jacob Abuna who had pawned them for twenty crusados due to the poverty felt by the Christians of Kodungallur after its destruction in 1524. De Sequeria states that he had befriended Mar Jacob, whom on his deathbed, requested that he retrieve the plates for him. De Sequeria sent his servant and a priest of Mar Jacob with money to reacquire the copper plate grant. After retrieving the plates, De Sequeria gave the plates to the Portuguese governor of India Martim Afonso de Sousa who ordered their contents translated. According to De Goes document the Thomas of Cana copper plates composed of two plates strung together with a thick copper wire and were written in the three languages of "Chaldean, Malabar, and Arabic". The account of De Goes is published in the text Cronica do Felicissmo Rei D. Manuel (1566).

Fr. Francisco Dionisio: In 1578 Fr. Francisco Dionisio, a Jesuit missionary, wrote a report to his superior documented as "On the Christians of St. Thomas". On the tradition of origin of the Christians of Kerala, Dionisio notes that St. Thomas the Apostle arrived to Kerala and converted many to the faith. Dionisio states that this tradition is accepted by both the Christians as well as the "Pagans" of Kerala. Dionisio notes that after St. Thomas, two Syrian Bishops by the names of Mar Sapor and Mar Proth arrived to Kollam. After Mar Sapor and Mar Proth, Dionisio expresses that the merchant "Quinai Thoma" arrived to Kerala and helped the dwindling Church to prosper and grow. Dionisio affirms that knowledge of Knai Thoma is known due to "a sheet of iron which the Portuguese found in the possession of these Christians". Scholar Istvan Perczel tentatively supports Dionisio's claim that Knai Thoma came after Mar Sapor and Proth. Christian tradition in Kerala however is not concordant with Dioniso, stating instead that Knai Thoma arrived before bishops Sapor and Proth. Francisco Dionisio's report is archived as Amario Jesuitico, cod. 28, ff.34-38, later published by Fr. Wicki SJ in the text Documenta Indica Vol XII

Fr. Antonio Monserratte: In 1579, Fr. Antonio Monseratte, a missionary in Kerala wrote a report on the St. Thomas Christians. On the ethnic division of the Christians, Monseratte notes that some Christians claim descent from St. Thomas the Apostle while others descend from Mar Thoma the Syrian (Thomas of Cana):

“My chief occupation has been with the Christians of Sierra, who commonly call themselve of St. Thomas. As regards the origin of these Christians, there are two opinions: one is that all are descended from the disciples of the Apostle St. Thomas: others say only from one Mar Thoma the Syrian. This word Mar is in Chaldean design of honour, and means the same as don and Saint in Spanish, and the Syrians use this word Mar in both meanings: for they call St. Thomas Mar Thoma and [they use it] for any honourable and noble person, Mar Jacob, Don Diego.

Monseratte expresses his opinion that the Christians of Kerala not only descend from St. Thomas the Apostle and Knai Thoma but also Nairs who regularly converted to Christianity. On Knai Thoma's arrival, Monserratte expresses that the merchant had found the St. Thomas Christians in India who were in a deprecated position. Monseratte states that Knai Thoma made his seat in Kodgunallur and had two wives, one free and the other a slave woman. Furthermore, Monseratte notes that Christians of India adopted the Syrian tradition because of Knai Thoma and expresses the importance they give to him:

"...Hence it happened that these Christians took the rite and customs of the Syrian Church, because this Quinai Thoma procured that Bishops might come from his country, for whom these peo¬ple have great respect for three reasons:

1. Because in them they recognize the nation and caste of their ancestor;

2. Because they have heard that Christ our Lord spoke Syrian as it was spoken in Jerusalem after the captivity of Babylon; and

3. Because most the Bishops and Priests (whom they call caxija in Syriac) come from these parts through Jerusalem."

Monseratte's report is archived as ARSI, Goa 12 II, ff. 521-524, later published by Fr. Joseph Wicki in the text Documenta Indica XI (1970).

=== 17th century ===
Fr. Antonio De Gouvea:In 1602-1603, Augustinian priest Fr. Antonio De Gouvea visited Kerala and took upon the role of secretary to Archbishop Alexio De Menezes of Goa. Gouvea recorded the journey of the Archbishop in India and documented information on the Christians of Kerala. Gouvea noted that Knai Thoma was an "Armenian" merchant who was also called "Marthoma" or Lord Thomas by the Christians of Kerala and that he procured for them privileges in the form of his copper plate grant. Gouvea gives information on the plates and states that they were entrusted to the Portuguese by Mar Jacob in the following citation:

"As he (Thomas of Cana) was noble and rich, and carried on a great trade, he was shown much favour and hospitality by the king of Cranganor, who, as we saw above, was the most powerful of Malavar. From him he received many privileges and honours for the Christians among whom he lived, and a very spacious ground where to found a big Church, in keeping with the founder's power and wealth, all which he caused to write on copper-plates. One Mar Jacob, Bishop of these Christians, fearing they might be lost, entrusted them to the Factor of Cochin when the Portuguese made the factory there, in order that, when necessary to them, the Christians might from there make use of them, and they were for many years in the factory, to be kept in the house, until through carelessness they disappeared, which these Christians greatly chafe at, not having writings whereby to defend themselves before the infidel kings..."

Gouvea also writes on the ethnic division of the St. Thomas Christians into Northist and Southist (Knanaya). Gouvea states that because Knai Thoma was powerful and had businesses in many parts of Malabar he had two wives and families, one on the northern side of Kodungallur and the other on the southern. According to Gouvea, Knai Thoma had his own wife and children on the southern side while on the northern side he had a family from a Nayar woman converted Christian as slave. Furthermore, Gouvea notes that Northist and Southist did not ally in marriage and that they had separate churches and priests. Gouvea explains the division further in the following citation:

"This Marthoma who received these last mentioned privileges lived among these same Christians, and as he was very powerful and carried on trade and business in many parts of Malabar, had for this purpose two houses and families, one on the southern side of Cranganor and the other on the northern side. On the southern side he had his own wife and children: on the northern side he had a Nair woman converted Christian as slave, from whom also he had children. At his death he divided his possession among all; leaving to the legitimate children all that he had on the southern side, and to the bastards his possessions on the northern side. With that each remained in places of one's own inheritance, and all of them marrying began to multiply such a way that the descendants of the legitimate children settled in Cranganor, Kaduthuruthy, Kottayam, Diamper and other places; and the bastards multiplied themselves in other parts. Thus the Christianity began growing with the descendance and family of Thomas Cana; but with this growth, developed a discord among the descendants of the legitimate children and those who had marriage alliance with them, and those (the descendants) of the bastards, which continues until today, considering the ones being legitimate to be more honorable than the others. Hence, they do not tolerate to ally oneself with the others by marriages, nor even to continue in the church of the others; nor to have in ones churches priests belonging to the caste of the others. As in the course of the time they multiplied very much by marriage and alliances, all the Christians of Malabar happened to be descendants of the ones or of the others, and so the whole Christianity (Church) is divided into these two sides, except those of Travancore and Thodamala where they did not go..."

Antonio De Gouvea's account is archived in his published work Jornada do Arcebispo de Goa Dom Frey Aleyxo de Menezes (1604).

Archbishop Francisco Ros: In 1585, the Jesuit missionary Francisco Ros arrived to Kerala and learned Malayalam as well as Syriac, later becoming a professor of Syriac at Vaipicotta Seminary. Ros was elevated as Archbishop of Angamaly (the See of the St. Thomas Christians) in 1600 by the King of Portugal. In 1604 he wrote a long report on the history and traditions of the Christians of Kerala. Ros called Knai Thoma "Thomas Cananeo" a rich "Armenian" merchant native to Babylon. Ros writes that before the coming of Knai Thoma there existed in India the St. Thomas Christians who had come to Kerala from Mylapore the shrine of St. Thomas the Apostle in India. Ros more clearly explains the ethnic division of the Christians of Kerala by stating that the Southist (Knanaya) are also St. Thomas Christians but are a minority known as the "Thomas Cananeo Party" and the Northist are descended from the older native St. Thomas Christians. Ros states that the Knanaya avoided marriage with other St. Thomas Christians and had their own churches at Udiamperor, Carturte (Kaduthuruthy), Cotete (Kottayam), and Turigure (Thodpuzha/Chunkom):

"So that, already long before the coming of Thomas Cananeo, there were St. Thomas Christians in this Malavar, who had come from Mailapur, the town of St. Thomas. And the chief families are four in number: Cotur, Catanal, Onamturte, Narimaten, which are known among all these Christians, who became multiplied and extended through the whole of this Malavar, also adding to themselves some of the gentios who would convert themselves. However, the descendants of Thomas Cananeo always remained above them without wishing to marry or to mix with these other Christians...Whence there arose between the St. Thomas Christians and the others great discord, and there were anciently among them great disputes: wherefore at Carturte and Cotete it was necessary to make different Churches, each party keeping aloof from the other. And those of the Thomas Caneneo party went in one Church, and the others in the other. And last year, 1603, the same was the cause of the quarrels between those of Udiamper and Candanada, each one holding out for his party. And it is wonderful to see the aversion which one party has for the other, without being able to forget their antiquities and the fables they have in this matter. The St. Thomas Christians descending from Thomas Caneneo are few. They are at Udiamper, and at the great Church of Carturte and at the great Church of Cotete, and at Turigure.

Additionally, Ros states that "Thomas Cananeo" arrived in 345 C.E. and received a copper plate grant along with 264 elephant cubits of land from the Chera Perumal who reigned "more than one thousand two hundred years ago". Ros notes that seventy-two houses, a church dedicated to St. Thomas, and a bazaar were built on the land Thoma acquired from the Perumal. Furthermore, Ros expresses that the manner of reckoning (calendar system) used during the granting of the Thomas of Cana copper plates is long lost because for the last 779 years the inhabitants of Kerala have been using the Coulao Era or Kollam calendar (Kollavarsham). Ros states that the "copper original" of the plates were taken to Portugal by the Religious of St. Francis, who only left a copy of the plates in Kerala. Ros gives the following summarized account of the copper plate grant:

"Before the full moon, the same king Coquarangon being in Carnelur, there arrived in a ship Thomas Caneneo, a chief man, who had resolved to see the uttermost part of the East, and some men, seeing him as he arrived, went to inform the king. And the king himself came and saw and called said chief man Thomas and he disembarked and came before the king who spoke graciously to him; and to honor him he gave him in surname his own name, calling him Coquarangon Caneneo. And he received this honor from the king and went to rest in his place. And the king gave him the city of Magoderpatanam forever. And the said king, being in his great prosperity, went one day to hunt in the forest, and the same king surrounded the whole forest and he called in haste for Thomas, who came and stood before the king in a lucky hour, and the king questioned the soothsayer. And the king afterwards spoke to Thomas saying that he would build a city in that forest. And he answered to the king first making reverence and said: "I desire this forest for myself". And the king granted it to him and gave it forever. And at once, the next day he cleared the forest and cast his eyes on it in the same year, on the eleventh of April, and gave it as an inheritance to Thomas at the time and day aforesaid, in the King's name, who laid the first brick for the church and for the house of Thomas Caneneo, and made there a city for all (of them) and entered the church and there made prayer the same day. After these things, Thomas himself went to the king's palaces and offered him presents, and afterwards he asked the king to give that land to him and to his descendants; and he measured two hundred and sixty-four elephant cubits, and gave them to Thomas and his descendants for ever: and the same time seventy-two houses which immediately were erected there, and gardens, and trees with their enclosures, and with their paths and boundaries and inner yards. And he granted him seven kinds of musical instruments, and all the honors, and to speak and walk like a king and that at the weddings the women might give a certain signal with their finger to their mouth, and he granted him distinct weight, and to adorn the ground with cloths, and he granted them royal fans and to double the sandal (mark) on the arm, and a tent and a royal canopy in every part of the kingdom for ever, and besides five tributes to Thomas, and to his lineage, and to his confederates, for men, and for women, and for all his relatives, and to the children of his law for ever. The said king gave it in his name"

Witnesses:

- Condaxeril Canden
- Cherucaraprota Chaten (The King's Chief Door-Keeper)
- Areunden Conden (The King's Councillor)
- Amenate Counden Guerulen (Captain of the Army)
- Chirumalaprota Tirivicramen Comeren (Councillor of the East Side of Malabar)
- Peruala Ata Aditen (Singer of the King)
- Perubalanata Cottoeoude (Guard of the Kings Port)
- Bichremen Chinguende Carturte (King's Chamberlain)
- Araniperumoouil (Scribe of the King)

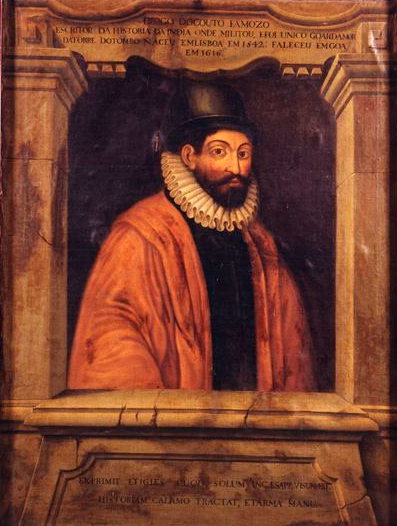
Historian Diogo do Couto

Diogo Do Couto: Serving as the official historian and keeper of archives of Portuguese India, Diogo Do Couto spent over 50 years of his life in Kerala. In 1611, Do Couto wrote on the history and traditions of the Syrian Christians of Kerala. Do Couto notes that Thomas Cananeo was an "Armenian" merchant who arrived to Kodungallur in the year 811 C.E., acquired copper plates and built three churches dedicated to St. Mary, St. Thomas, and St. Kuriakose. Do Couto states that he had witnessed the plates first hand at the Portuguese factory of Cochin and notes their later disappearance as well. Additionally Do Couto notes that knowledge on Knai Thoma is also known from old Chaldean books in the possession of the Christians of Kerala.

On the division of the Christians, Do Couto states that the Knanaya are descended from Thomas Cananeo and the people who came with him. Do Couto further notes that the Knanites had primary settlements at Diamper (Udiamperoor), Kottayam, and Kaduthuruthy. Do Couto also states that after the arrival of Knai Thoma, came the two Syrian bishops Mar Sapor and Mar Proth who arrived at Kollam. Do Couto's account:

"From the people who had come with him proceed the Christians of Diamper, Kottayam and Kaduthuruthy, who without doubt are Armenians by caste, and their sons too: the same, because they had brought their wives; and afterwards those who descended from them married in the land, and in the course of time they all became Malabarians. The kingdoms in which these Christians of St. Thomas are found today are the following: In the kingdom of the Malabar, 26 leagues from the country of Madure; in the kingdom of Turubuli (Thodupuzha?) its neighbour; in the kingdom Maota; in the kingdom of Batimena; in the kingdom of Travancor; in the kingdom of Diamper; in the kingdom of Pepper (Kaduthuruthy); in the kingdom of Tecancutes; in the kingdom of Parur; and finally in the kingdom of Kottayam. All these Christians, after the Catholic prelates who came to them from the city of Edessa had died, lived many hundreds of years in the same faith which their fathers and grandfathers had taught them until about A. D. 730 before Thomas Cananeo arrived there. And a few years after the foundation of the city of Quilon, (from this foundation, as I said already, the Malabar count their era, and in this year of 1611 as I write this is the year 722 from its foundation, and therefore according to our count that city began to be in the year 899), came two Chaldeans from Babylonia called Mar Xabio and Mar Prod..."

=== 18th century ===
In 1720, Veticutel Mathai Kathanar, a Syrian Jacobite priest, wrote a short history of the Church of Malabar. Fr. Mathai's account is unique due to the fact that unlike previous European sources, Mathai's source is the first native document accounting the history of the Christians of Kerala. Mathai gives a traditional account mentioning the arrival of St. Thomas the Apostle, then Knai Thoma and the people who came with him, and finally the bishops Sapor and Proth to the city of Kollam. On Knai Thoma's arrival Veticutel expresses that he arrived in the year 345 and gave following traditional account regarding his journey:

"...At the same time, a vision appeared by night to the metropolitan of Edessa. He arose in the morning and went to the Catholicos of the East, and told him of the vision which he had seen. When the Catholicos had heard it, he sent messengers to all the churches and monasteries and cities of the diocese and called the people to his presence And when many flocks had met with their bishops and merchants, he related to them what the Bishop had seen, and they spoke together. Then one of them arose, to wit a merchant called Thomas of Jerusalem, who answered sayiag : “Behold, i have now heard a report about Malabar and India from foreign countries and men." The Catholicos, hearing his answer, rose from his seat, went to him, embraced him lovingly, and thus addressed him: “I entreat thee, my very dear son, to go to Malabar, to visit the inhabitants of the country, and to tell me what has befallen them.” Accordingly, that occasion offering, Thomas of Jerusalem set out for Malabar, and coming to Moljomkare, he saw the Thomas Christians; and they were mutually pleased, the Christians telling him about their affairs - which when Thomas had heard, he gave them courage and exhorted them with kind words; and straightway he embarked and returned to his country. Back in his country, he went to the Catholicos and said to him: "Lo! I have seen with my eyes the Thomas Christians, and we spoke together and were mutually pleased. I teft them hopeful and returned." The Catholicos, hearing these words, answered thus: "Although I am ready to lay down my life for them, I ask you to be pleased to tell me what those children of mine most wish me to do." Then he stated to the Catholicos what the Malabar brethren desired. Therefore, not long after, yea in those very days, with the help of the adorable God and by order of the Catholicos of the East, Thomas of Jerusalem, the merchant, went forth again, and with him the Bishop who had seen the vision, and at the same time presbyters and beacons and also men and women, young men and maidens, from Jerusalem and Bagdad and Ninive, and they entered a ship and left for Malabar, where they landed at Moljomkare in the year 345 of the Lord."

In his traditional account Fr. Mathai Veticutel also notes the ethnic division of the Christians of Kerala by stating that the migrants and the native St. Thomas Christians inhabited two distinct sides of Kodungallur:

...The Malabars at once recognised them, and they came together for advice to the brethren who had arrived, which done, they went to Serkun, the king of the whole of Malabar, and presented him with gifts. And the king was pleased with them (the gifts) and said to them “I shall give you whatever you ask of me.” And he gave them the land which they desired, a very long and very broad piece of ground; besides he granted them all the royal honours' which were written on copper-plates. Lo! these plates are preserved among us to this day. Having received all this from the king, they returned to Moljomkare to build a church and town And they built a church in the country of Kuramaklur which they had received in gift from the king, and there they erected a town of 472 houses from east to west on both sides, and they duly inhabited it. Now, in those days and subsequently, Syrian Fathers used to come by order of the Catholicos of the East, and they took care of the district of India and Malabar, while the Syrians spread from that town."

Niranam Grandhavari, the first book of history in Malayalam, which is widely speculated to have been written in reference to uninterrupted chronicles kept by the Archdeacons of Malankara until 1653, gives this account of the legend of Knai Thoma:

In 345, Saint Thomas was seen , in the dream of the bishop of Uraha. According to that, as per the orders of the Patriarch of Antioch , sent Mar Joseph Episcopa, priests, deacons, men, women, and children along with Thomas of Kana since the baptism and marriage was administered in Malayalam by elders due to the lack of priests. They came and settled at Malayalam. 65 From these legends, the following are to be derived.

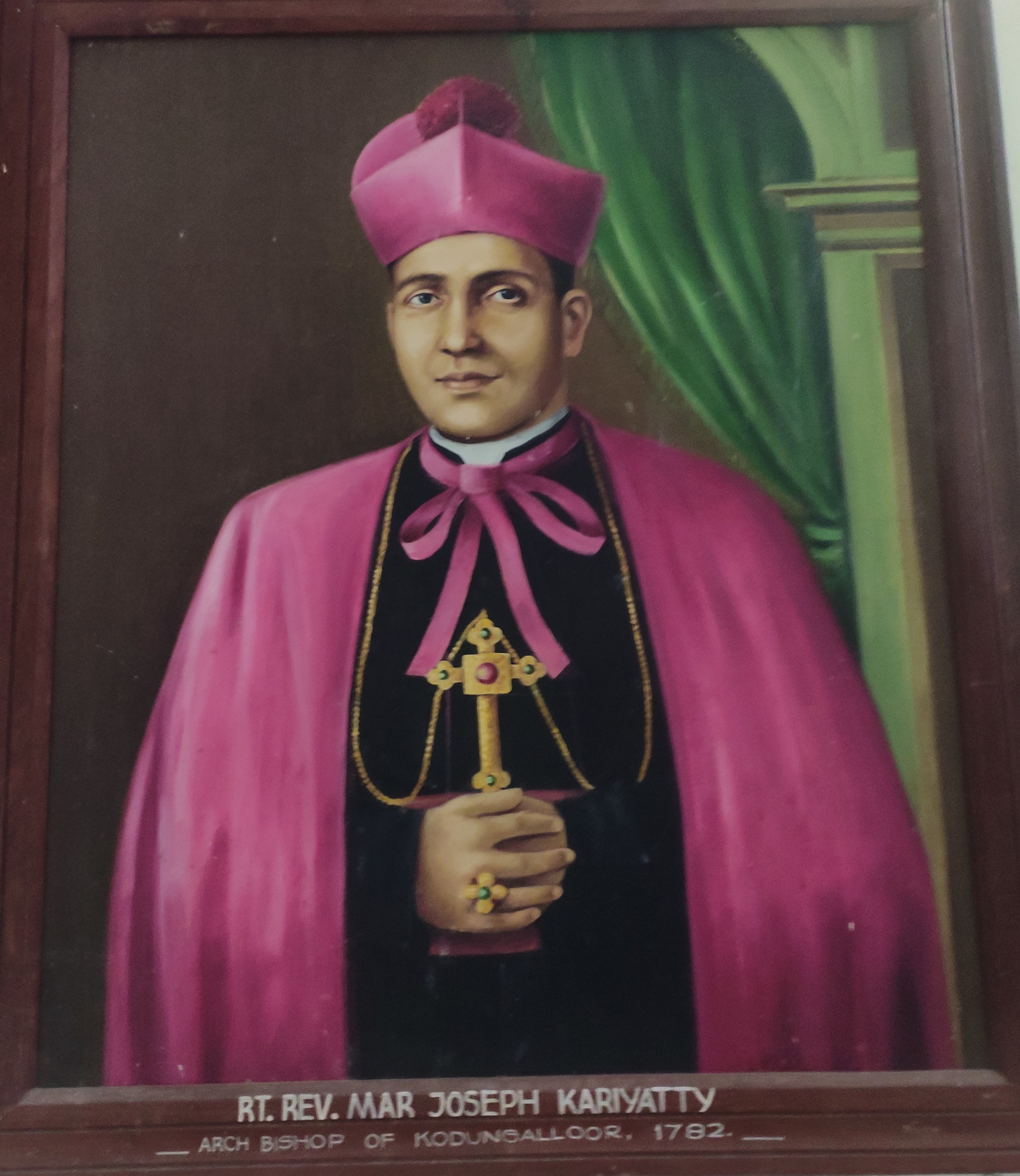
Mar Ousep Cariattil

In the 18th century (1782), Mar Ousep Cariattil, Northist priest and leader of the Kerala Syrian Catholics, wrote a short history of the Malabar Church in which he included the arrival of Knai Thoma. Cariattil notes the importance given to the migration of Knai Thoma and his party by the Native Christians of St. Thomas in their traditions:

"Those known as the Christians of St. Thomas in Malabar had preserved from the year 52 of the popular era for seven entire centuries. After that failing the succession of Bishops, began a decadence of Religion. However this defect was remedied by a rich and liberal merchant and Zealous catholic, Knai Thoma, who returning in haste to Babylonia, his native country, brought with him a bishop and two priests of laudable behavior and great learning in Syriac and Chaldean, which are the languages of the Rite of the people of Malabar, They worked with great zeal, and very soon they made the ancient virtues and fervor of Christian religion reflourish. These (as the first apostles) helped the nation in everything pertaining to ecclesiastical discipline and sciences. And therefore the Nation always considered the Babylonians as their benefactors. In these circumstances due to the want of natives, during the following centuries the Bishops from Babylonia governed the churches with no vested interest, they being, as we said, of the same Rite"

== Sainthood ==
In the 17th century, several Portuguese officials noted that the Christians of Kerala viewed Knai Thoma as a saint. In 1604, Archbishop Franciso Ros gave the following account:

"...I found moreover the name of the said Thomas Cananeo among the names of the Saints which the Deacon names in the Mass; and it was said of him that he gave a large sum of money to the king of Malabar to buy that ground of Cranganor."

In 1611, Historian Diogo Do Couto also noted that Knai Thoma was revered as a saint by the native Christians in the following record:

"...The first Church which the Holy Apostle built was in Patanam, which having been destroyed in many great wars at that time, was rebuilt by Thomas Cananeo and later was transferred to Parur, as we have said. The second church which this Cananeo built, as we have already said, was in Cranganor; and for this deed these Christians had placed him in the catalogue of their saints, and were praying to him."
