= Periyapattinam =

- village
- Location in Tamil Nadu, India
- Coordinates: 9.272625°N 78.902328°E
- Country: India
- State: Tamil Nadu
- District: Ramanathapuram
- Elevation: 8 m (26 ft)

Population (2011)
  - Total: 9,478

Languages
  - Official: Tamil
- Time zone: UTC+5:30 (IST)
- PIN: 623 523
- Telephone code: 91 4567
- Vehicle registration: TN 65
- Distance from Chennai: 560 kilometres (350 mi) S
- Distance from Madurai: 135 kilometres (84 mi) E
- Distance from Ramanathapuram: 20 kilometres (12 mi) S
- Climate: BSh (Köppen)
- Precipitation: 909 millimetres (35.8 in)
- Avg. summer temperature: 30 °C (86 °F)
- Avg. winter temperature: 25 °C (77 °F)

Periyapattinam is a large village located in the eastern part (Gulf of Mannar) of Ramanathapuram district, Tamil Nadu, India. The inhabitants of this village are primarily Tamil Muslim.

== History ==
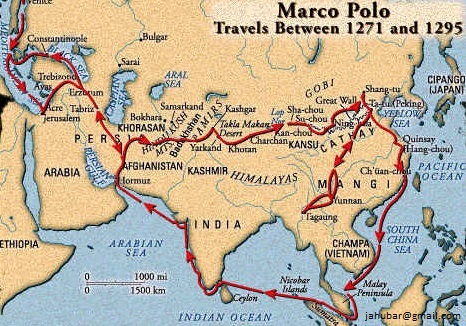
Marcopolo Travel

This place is one of the historic ports of Eastern (Gulf of Mannar) from 21 km distance of Ramanathapuram where Ibn Battuta, Marco Polo and other famous travellers visited. Battuta mentioned this place as "Fattan" at his book Rihla. The port was called "Parakirama Pattinam" in the 10th century. In the 12th century, it was called "Pavitra Manicka Pattinam". It was also called "Ta Pa Tan" by the famous Chinese traveller Wang Ta-Yuan in the 14th century. Now, it is called Periyapattinam, where thousands of Muslims live. Most Muslims consider themselves to be settler descendants of maritime traders who had business linking the Persian Gulf to the south Indian coast and Southeast Asia.

Periyapattinam is often described as one of the earliest Jewish settlements in southern India. A rare Jewish inscription (c. 1200-1250 AD), originally situated on the Periyapattinam beach, was discovered from Valantharavai in 2022 (Valantaravai inscription).

== Demographics ==
As of 2011 India census,

Number of Households: 1777

Population	Person	Male	Female
Total	9730	5099	4631
In the age group 0–6 years	1100	520	580
Scheduled Castes (SC)	338	195	143
Scheduled Tribes (ST)	0	0	0
Literates	7344	4098	3246
Illiterate	2386	1001	1385
Total Worker	2313	2176	137
Main Worker	1950	1871	79
Main Worker - Cultivator	16	15	1
Main Worker - Agricultural Labourers	296	287	9
Main Worker - Household Industries	20	11	9
Main Worker - Other	1618	1558	60
Marginal Worker	363	305	58
Marginal Worker - Cultivator	15	7	8
Marginal Worker - Agriculture Labourers	4	4	0
Marginal Worker - Household Industries	4	0	4
Marginal Workers - Other	340	294	46
Marginal Worker (3-6 Months)	346	295	51
Marginal Worker - Cultivator (3-6 Months)	15	7	8
Marginal Worker - Cultivator (3-6 Months)	4	4	0
Marginal Worker - Agriculture Labourers (3-6 Months)	0	0	0
Marginal Worker - Household Industries (3-6 Months)	327	284	43
Marginal Worker - Other (3-6 Months)	17	10	7
Marginal Worker - Cultivator (0-3 Months)	0	0	0
Marginal Worker - Agriculture Labourers (0-3 Months)	0	0	0
Marginal Worker - Household Industries (0-3 Months)	4	0	4
Marginal Worker - Other Workers (0-3 Months)	13	10	3
Non Worker	7417	2923	4494

== Hospitals ==
=== List of Hospitals ===
- Government Hospital -Periyapattinam
- Jawahar Hospital# - Ramanathapuram (Dr. Jawahar) from Preiyapattnam
- Government Hospital - Ramanathapuram
- Syed Ammal Trust Hospital - Ramanathapuram
- Pioneer Hospitals (P) Ltd - Ramanathapuram
- A.R.Hospital - Ramanathapuram
- M.G Hospital - Ramanathapuram
- Sathya Hospital- Ramanathapuram

== Education ==
Notable schools

- Government higher secondary school, Periyapattinam(1970 onwards) - Periyapattinam
- Al Ameen Matriculation School(1986onwards) - Periyapattinam
- Al Kalam Matriculation School - Periyapattinam
- National Academy Matriculation School, Ramanathapuram - Ramanathapuram
- MG Public Matriculation School, Ramanathapuram
- Periyapattinam Higher Secondary School
- Syed Ammal Matriculation School - Ramanathapuram
- Nabeesa Ammal Matric Higher Secondary School - Ramanathapuram
- Allwin Matric hr.sec School - Ramanathapuram
- Velumanickam Matriculation school - Vani-Ramanathapuram

Notable colleges

- Mohamed Sathak Engineering College - Kilakarai
- Syed Hameedha Arts and Science College - Ramanathapuram
- Syed Ammal Engineering College - Ramanathapuram
- Rashidiya Women Islamic College for Women - Periyapattinamhr.sec
- Caussanel College Of Arts & Science - Muthupettai, Periyapattinam
- Thasim Beevi Abdul Kadher College for Women Kilakarai
- Mohamed Sathak Polytechnic College - Kilakarai
- Syed Ammal Arts and Science college - Ramanathapuram

== Cuisine ==
The food habits practised by the Periyapattinam people have similarities with Sri Lankan Tamil Muslim cuisine and Malay cuisine. For example, foods like vatlappam, Idiyappam are probably from Sri Lanka. Most of the dietary practices of people of Periyapattinam follow that of coastal dwellers i.e. seafood dependence.

Other foods include: Fish Kulambu (Fish Curry), Karuvattu Aanam( Dryfish curry), Thengai Paal Rasam & Paal Puliyaanam (Coconut Milk Rasam), Prawns, and Crab. Vattalappam is a famous dish eaten during Eid and some special occasions. Suttuppenanchaanam is also a traditional famous dish in this village.

== Gallery ==
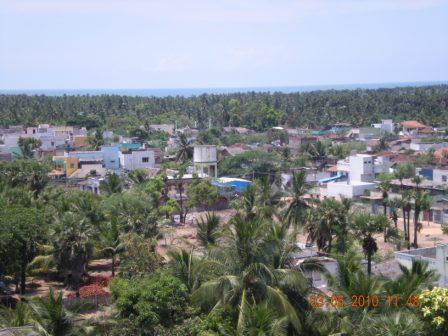
Aerial view Periyapattinam Village

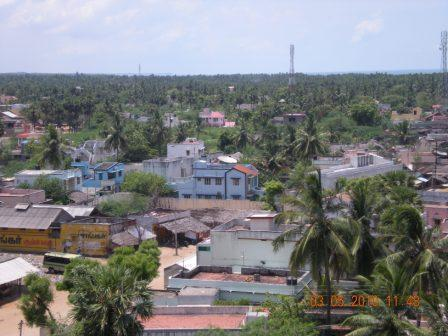
Aerial view Periyapattinam Village

Aerial view Playground

Mosque - Masjid Al Falah

Old Mosque - Jalal Jamal Jummah Palli(14th century onwards)

Govt. Higher Secondary School

Syed Ali Waliullah Dargah

Syed Ali Waliullah Dargah
