= Abraham Hyacinthe Anquetil-Duperron =

French Indologist (1731–1805)

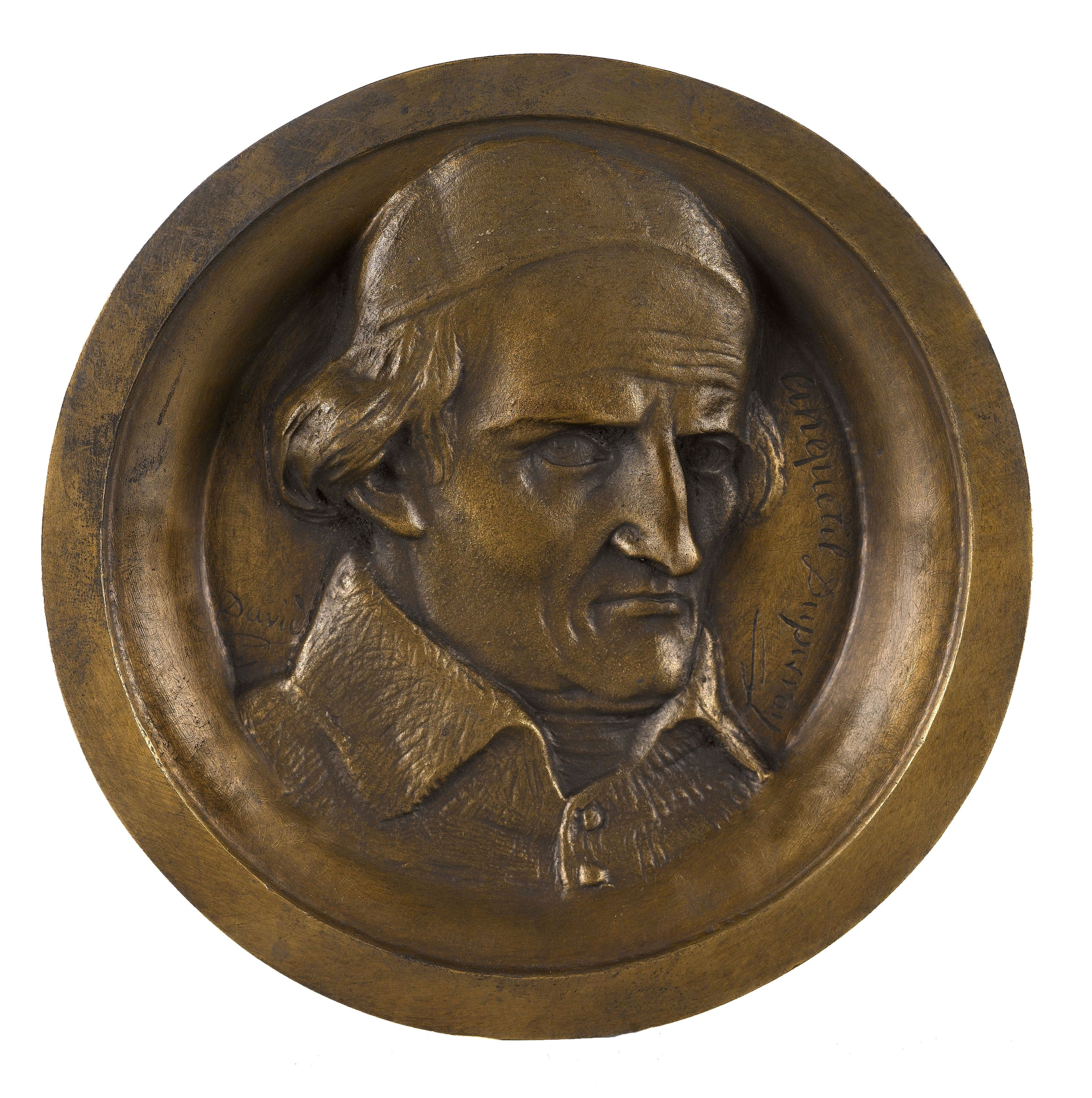
- Born: 7 December 1731; Paris, France
- Died: 17 January 1805 (aged 73)
- Occupation: Orientalist

Abraham Hyacinthe Anquetil-Duperron (7 December 1731 – 17 January 1805) was the first professional French Indologist. He conceived the institutional framework for the new profession. He inspired the founding of the École française d'Extrême-Orient a century after his death. The library of the Institut français de Pondichéry is named after him. Through his translations he helped introduce Indian texts such as the Upanishads to the West.

== Early life ==
Abraham Hyacinthe Anquetil was born in Paris on 7 December 1731 as the fourth of seven children of Pierre Anquetil, a spice importer. As was the custom of the time, the name of one of his father's estates, "Duperron", was added to his name to distinguish him from his brothers. Anquetil-Duperron initially distinguished himself in the study of theology at Paris and Utrecht with the intention of becoming a priest like his elder brother Louis-Pierre Anquetil. In the course of his studies, however, he acquired such an interest in Latin, Hebrew, and Greek that he chose to devote himself entirely to philology and classical studies and discontinued his clerical training. He travelled to Amersfoort near Utrecht to study oriental languages, especially Arabic, with the Jansenists who were exiled there. On returning to Paris, his attendance at the Royal Library (Bibliothèque du Roi, now the National Library) attracted the attention of the keeper of the manuscripts, Claude Sallier, who hired Anquetil-Duperron as an assistant on a small salary.

== Early interest in Indian manuscripts ==
In 1754, Michelangelo-André Le Roux Deshauterayes, who at the time was professor for Arabic at the Collège Royal, showed Anquetil-Duperron a facsimile of four leaves of a Vendidad Sade (Note: A Vendidad Sade is a particular variant of a Yasna text into which sections of the Visperad and Vendidad are interleaved. A Vendidad Sade contains only Avestan text, without exegetical commentary. The pages that Anquetil-Duperron were shown were a copy of part of a manuscript that had been purchased in Surat, India by George Boucher in 1719 and brought to England by Richard Cobbe in 1723. Cobbe presented it to Oxford's Bodleian Library, where it became known by the misnomer "Oxford Vendidad".) that had been sent to Deshauterayes's uncle Michel Fourmont in the 1730s in the hope that someone might be able to decipher it. The original was at Oxford's Bodleian Library, but the script was not recognized, and so the manuscript was placed in a box chained to a wall near the library's entrance and shown to everyone who might be able to identify the curiosity. Also at the Bodleian was the manuscript collection of James Fraser (1713–1754), who had lived in Surat (a city in present-day Gujarat, India) for over sixteen years, where he had been a Factor of the British East India Company and later Member of Council. Fraser had returned to Britain with some 200 Sanskrit and Avestan manuscripts, which he intended to translate, but he died prematurely on 21 January 1754.

In his later travelogue, Anquetil-Duperron is sharply critical of the English, both of Fraser's "failure" to accomplish what he intended, and of the Bodleian's failure to realize that Thomas Hyde's manuscripts, which the Bodleian also had in its possession, included a transliteration table for Avestan script. Playing on the French antipathy towards the English, in his travelogue he later claimed that after seeing the facsimile pages of the Oxford manuscript, he resolved to "enrich [his] country with that singular work" and the translation of it.^{apud} There was a government interest in obtaining eastern manuscripts; (Note: Fifty years earlier, J. F. Pétis de la Croix had been ordered to bring back manuscripts from Iran, but had not been successful.) Anquetil-Duperron obtained a mission from the government to do so but, unable to afford his own passage to India, he enlisted as a common soldier for the French East India Company on 2 or 7 November 1754. He marched with the company of recruits from the Parisian prisons to the Atlantic port of L'Orient, where an expedition was preparing to depart. His friends secured his discharge and, on 7 February 1755, the minister, touched by his romantic zeal for knowledge, granted him free passage, a seat at the captain's table, an allowance of 500 livres from the library, and a letter of introduction to the French governor in India which would entitle him to a small salary while there. Anquetil-Duperron left France as a free passenger on 24 February 1755.

== First travels ==
After a passage of six months, Anquetil-Duperron landed on 10 August 1755 at the French colony at Pondicherry, on the coast in south-eastern India. From his private correspondence it appears that he intended to become "master of the religious institutions of all Asia", which in the 18th century were still imagined to all derive from the Indian Vedas. For that, Anquetil-Duperron knew he would need to learn Sanskrit. He initially studied Persian (the lingua franca of Mughal India), which Europeans in the 18th century still presumed to have descended from Sanskrit. His plan was then to visit the Brahmins in Benares to learn Sanskrit "at some famous pagoda".^{apud} Half a year later, he was living on rice and vegetables and saving his money so that he might "find some Brahmin" to become the disciple of. As he also wanted to "study the Indian books", he decided to travel to the French colony at Chandannagar, also known in French as Chandernagor, in Bengal, where he arrived in April 1756. He promptly fell sick; by coincidence, he landed in the hospital of the Jesuit missionary Antoine Mozac, who some years earlier had copied the "Pondicherry Vedas". Anquetil-Duperron remained in the hospital until September or October 1756 and began to wonder whether he should not instead become a priest as he had intended years earlier. Meanwhile, the outbreak of the Seven Years' War in Europe had renewed hostilities between French and British forces in India, where the conflict is known as the Third Carnatic War. The British East India Company under Robert Clive and the British Navy under Charles Watson bombarded and captured Chandannagar on 23 March 1757 and Anquetil-Duperron resolved to leave the territory. Unable to gain access to the Vedas, Anquetil-Duperron planned to travel to Tibet and China to find the ancient Indian texts there. Discouraged by news that there were no texts to be found there, Anquetil-Duperron returned overland to Pondicherry over the course of a hundred-day trek. There, he found his brother Etienne Anquetil de Briancourt, who had been named consul at Surat.

As Etienne assured Abraham that the Zoroastrian priests of Surat would teach him their sacred texts as well as the languages in which they were written, he resolved to accompany his brother. Wanting to explore the country, however, he disembarked from his brother's ship at Mahé and travelled overland the rest of the way on foot and on horseback. He arrived in Surat on 1 March 1758, at a time when the Indian Zoroastrians (Parsis) were embroiled in a bitter dispute over the intercalation of the Zoroastrian calendar, which is now called the "Kabiseh controversy". Each side cultivated ties with competing European traders. The one faction (the shahenshahis, led by a certain Muncherji Seth) had ties to the Dutch East India Company. The other (the kadmis, led by a certain Darab Kumana) maintained ties to the British East India Company and to Armenian merchants. In the travelogue, Darab's co-operation with Anquetil-Duperron is attributed to a need for assurance of French protection. It seems that Darab (and another priest, a certain Kaus) attempted to provide Anquetil-Duperron with an education similar to that given to priests. His essay Exposition du système théologique aligns itself with the texts and provides only glimpses of what the Parsis actually believed at the time. Anquetil-Duperron complains of the priests' interest with law and ritual rather than philosophy or theology. Anquetil-Duperron grew impatient with the methodical methods of the priests and with his inability to obtain manuscripts. According to his travelogue, the priests also had no desire to teach him Avestan and no expectations that he would master it well enough to translate their texts. Also according to Anquetil-Duperron, the priests were committing a great sacrilege in acquainting him with the texts and lessons were conducted in Persian so that the priest's Zoroastrian servant would not be aware of what was transpiring. Kaus's anxiety increased when Anquetil-Duperron demanded proper interpretation and not just translation. Via Persian, the two priests taught him what they knew of Avestan (which was not much) and of Zoroastrian theology (which was even less). In June 1759, 16 months after his arrival in Surat, he sent news to Paris that he had completed (in three months) a translation of the "Vendidad". (Note: Anquetil referred here to the Vendidad Sade (see note above) from which he had previously seen a copy of four leaves and not to the Vendidad proper.) The same June, the priest Darab arranged for Anquetil-Duperron to attend – in disguise but armed with a sword and pistol — a ceremony in a fire temple "in exchange for a small present and the hope of promenading the city in my palanquin".^{apud} Anquetil-Duperron also suggests that Darab attempted to convert him, but that he "courageously refused to waver".^{apud} Two centuries later, J. J. Modi would explain Anquetil-Duperron's invitation into a temple as only possible if the sacred fire had been temporarily removed because the temple was being renovated.^{cf.} On the other hand, Anquetil-Duperron states that he was given a sudra and kusti and he may have been formally invested with them, which would have made him a Zoroastrian in the priest's view, and thus would have been acceptable in a functioning temple.

== Duel and legal problems ==
In late 1759, Anquetil-Duperron killed a fellow countryman in a duel, was badly wounded himself, and was forced to take refuge with the British. Anquetil-Duperron's own brother demanded that he be handed over, but the British refused. In April 1760, the French authorities dropped the charges and allowed him to return to the French sector. In the meantime, Anquetil-Duperron had travelled all over Gujarat. At Surat and in his travels, he collected 180 manuscripts, which not only included almost all known Avestan language texts and many of the 9th/10th-century works of Zoroastrian tradition, but also other texts in a multitude of Indian languages. Anquetil-Duperron finished his translation in September 1760, and decided to leave Surat. From Surat, he intended again to travel to Benares but the widow of the Frenchman he had killed was bringing charges against him, which Anquetil-Duperron then used as an excuse to seek refuge again with the British and obtain passage on one of the English ships destined for Europe. He paid for his journey by calling in debts that others had made to his brother. Just before his departure, the priest Kaus lodged a complaint with the British that Anquetil-Duperron had failed to pay for all the manuscripts that he had purchased. The British seized his goods, but released them when Anquetil-Duperron's brother guaranteed payment. Anquetil-Duperron left Surat on 15 March 1761. He arrived at Portsmouth eight months later, where he was interned but allowed to continue working. After his release, he traveled to Oxford to check his copies of the Avestan language texts against those of the Bodleian. He then set out for France and arrived in Paris on 14 March 1762. He deposited his manuscripts in the Bibliothèque du Roi the next day.

== Report and fame ==
In June 1762, Anquetil-Duperron's report was published in the Journal des sçavans, and he became an instant celebrity. The title of his report indicated that he had gone to India to "discover and translate the works attributed to Zoroaster." It appears that this mischaracterization of his objective was in order to be seen as having achieved what he intended.

The librarian Jean-Jacques Barthélemy procured a pension for him and appointed him interpreter of oriental languages at the Bibliothèque du Roi. In 1763, he was elected an associate of the Académie des Inscriptions et Belles-Lettres and began to arrange for the publication of the materials he had collected during his travels.

In 1771, Anquetil-Duperron published his three-part Zend Avesta which had been ascribed to Zoroaster and which included not only a re-translation of what the priests had translated into Persian for him but also a travelogue (Journal du voyage de l'auteur aux Indes orientales), a summary of the manuscripts that he collected (Notice des manuscrits), a biography of Zoroaster (Vie de Zoroastre), a translation of the Bundahishn, and two essays (Exposition des usages civils et religieux des Parses and Système cérémonial et moral des livres zends et pehlvis).

== Controversy ==
A heated dispute broke out in Britain and in Europe, which questioned the authenticity of this claimed first translation into a European languages of the Avesta scriptures. It was suggested that Anquetil-Duperron's so-called Zend Avesta was not the genuine work of the prophet Zoroaster, but was a recent forgery. At the fore in this dispute was William Jones, an Oxford graduate, at the time studying law at the Middle Temple in London. Jones, the future founder of the Asiatic Society who would become known for his hypothesis in 1786 regarding a relationship among European and Indo-Aryan languages, had been deeply wounded by Anquetil-Duperron's scornful treatment of Jones's countrymen and, in a pamphlet written in French in 1771, Jones dismissed Anquetil-Duperron's manuscripts as a fraud. Other scholars in England criticised Anquetil-Duperron's translation on philological grounds.

In France, Voltaire poked fun at Anquetil-Duperron and his translation in his article "Zoroastre" (1772) in the Questions sur l'Encyclopédie. Diderot was likewise similarly "conspicuously disappointed". For these philosophes the ideas revealed by Anquetil-Duperron's translation seemed impossible to relate to the idealized Enlightenment-era view of Zoroaster or to his religion which they associated with simplicity and wisdom. Many German scholars, with the notable except of Herder, also attacked Anquetil-Duperron's translation.

In 1820, fifteen years after his death, Anquetil-Duperron was vindicated by the Danish philologist Rasmus Rask. The debate would rage for another thirty years after that. Anquetil-Duperron's "attempt at a translation was, of course, premature", and, as Eugène Burnouf demonstrated sixty years later, translating the Avesta via a previous translation was prone to errors. However, Anquetil-Duperron was the first to bring an ancient oriental sacred text other than the Bible to the attention of European scholars.

== Later years ==
Following his Zend Avesta and until his death in 1805, Anquetil-Duperron was occupied with studying the laws, history, and geography of India. "In his youth a kind of Don Juan; he now led the life of a poor, ascetic bachelor, combining Christian virtue with the wisdom of a Brahmin." During that period he abandoned society, and lived in voluntary poverty on a few pence a day.

In 1778, he published at Amsterdam his Législation orientale, in which he endeavoured to prove that the nature of oriental despotism had been greatly misrepresented by Montesquieu and others. His Recherches historiques et géographiques sur l'Inde appeared in 1786 and formed part of Thieffenthaler's Geography of India. In 1798, he published L'Inde en rapport avec l'Europe (Hamburg, 2 vols.), a work considered notable by the British for its "remarkable" invectives against them and for its "numerous misrepresentations".

Anquetil-Duperron's most valuable achievement in his last years was the publication of the Oupnek'hat, id est, Secretum tegendum, a two-volume Latin retranslation and commentary of a Persian translation of fifty Upanishads. Duperron had received the Persian translation from India in 1775 and had translated that into both French and Latin, but the French translation was never published. The Latin translation was published in Strasbourg in 1801-1802 and represents the first European language translation of a sacred book of Hinduism, albeit in an approximate rendering. Anquetil-Duperron's commentaries make up half the work. The Latin version was the initial introduction of the Upanishadic thought to Western scholars, although, according to Paul Deussen, the Persian translators had taken great liberties in their rendering of the original Sanskrit text and at times changed the meaning.

A 108-page French paraphrase of Duperron's Oupnek'hat by Jean-Denis Lanjuinais appeared in Millin de Grandmaison's Magasin Encyclopédique of 1805. Arthur Schopenhauer encountered Anquetil-Duperron's Oupnek'hat in the spring of 1814 and repeatedly called it not only his favorite book but the work of the entire world literature that is most worthy of being read. (Note: See the book-length study of the Oupnek'hat's influence on the genesis of Schopenhauer's philosophy by App.)

== Political and institutional activity ==
When the Institut de France was reorganised, Anquetil-Duperron was voted in as a member but soon resigned. In 1804, he refused to swear allegiance to Napoleon, stating that "his obeisance [was] to the laws of the government under which he lived and which protected him."^{apud}

== Death ==
Abraham Hyacinthe Anquetil-Duperron died in Paris on 17 January 1805. His work became one of the most important references for nineteenth-century spiritualists and occultists in France.
