= Sivalokanathar temple, Gramam =

Hindu temple in Tamil Nadu, India

Sivalokanathar temple
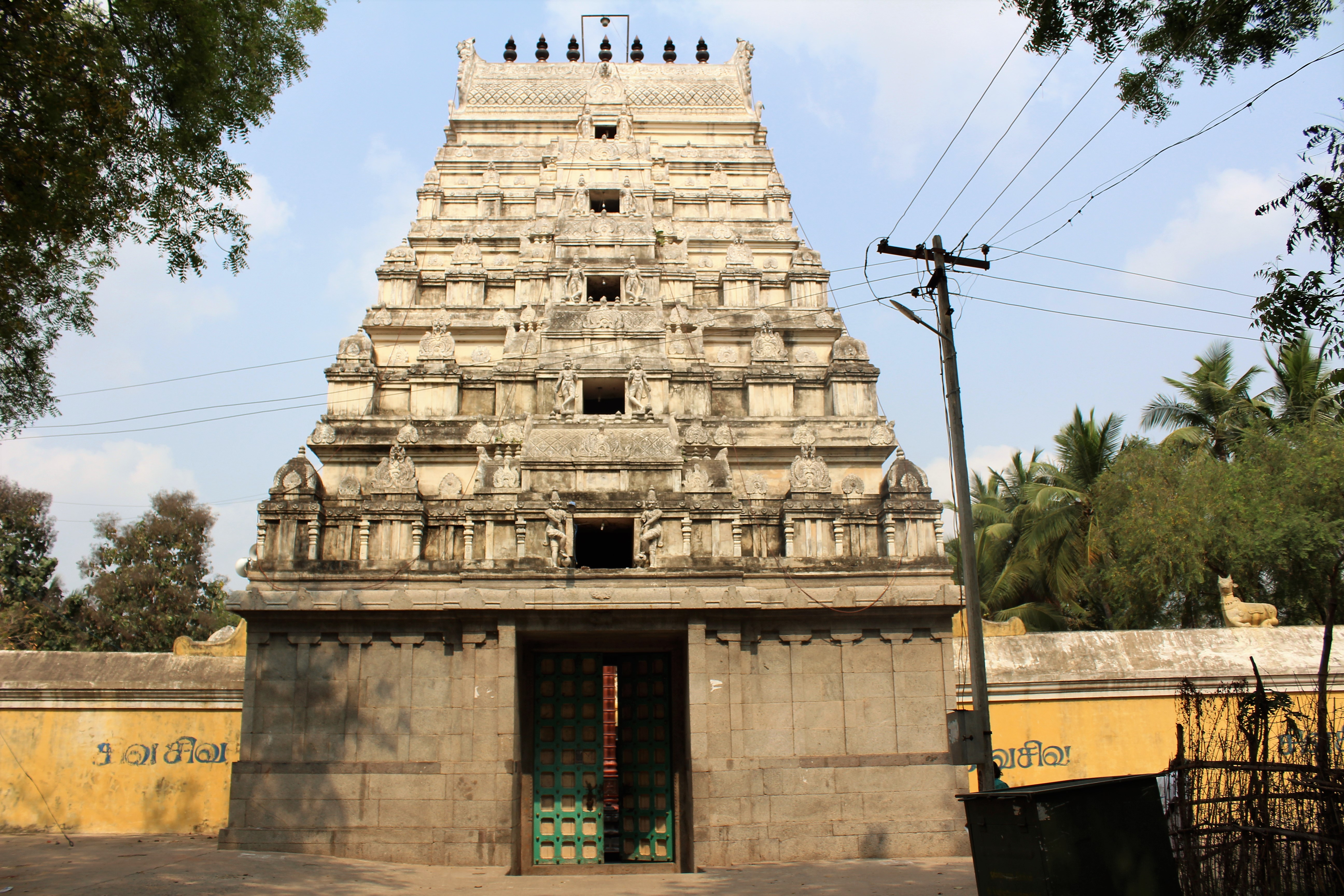

- Location in Tamil Nadu

Religion
- Affiliation: Hinduism
- District: Villupuram
- Deity: Sivalokanthar(Shiva)

Location
- State: Tamil Nadu
- Country: India
- Coordinates: 11°51′00″N 79°24′16″E

Architecture
- Type: Dravidian architecture

Sivalokanathar temple (also called Thirumundeeswaram or Sivalokanatha temple, Gramam) is a Hindu temple dedicated to the deity Shiva, located in Gramam, a village in Villupuram district in the South Indian state of Tamil Nadu. Shiva is worshiped as Sivalokanathar, and is represented by the lingam. His consort Parvati is depicted as Soundaranayagi. The presiding deity is revered in the 7th century Tamil Saiva canonical work, the Tevaram, written by Tamil saint poets known as the Nayanars and classified as Paadal Petra Sthalam.

The temple complex covers around one acre and can be entered through a seven-tiered gopuram, the main gateway. The temple has a number of shrines, with those of Sivalokanathar and his consort Soundaryanayagi, being the most prominent. All the shrines of the temple are enclosed in large concentric rectangular granite walls.

The original complex is believed to have been built by Cholas, while the present masonry structure was built by Vijayanagar kings during the 16th century. In modern times, the temple is maintained and administered by the Hindu Religious and Charitable Endowments Department of the Government of Tamil Nadu.

During the period of Appar in the 7th century, the presiding deity was called Aruttali Mahadevar, and later came to be known as Sivalokanathasvamin.

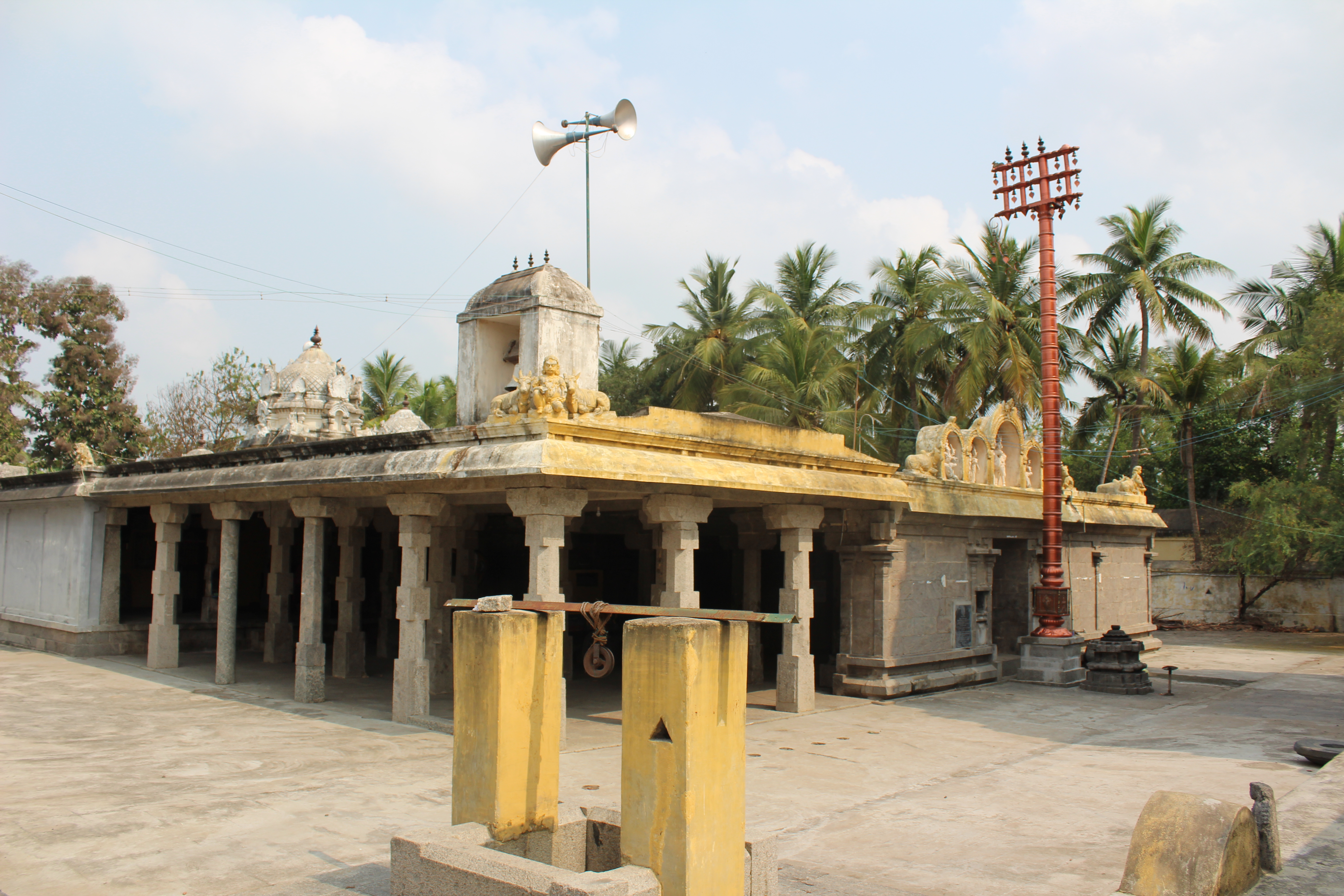
Image of the shrines of the temple

== History ==
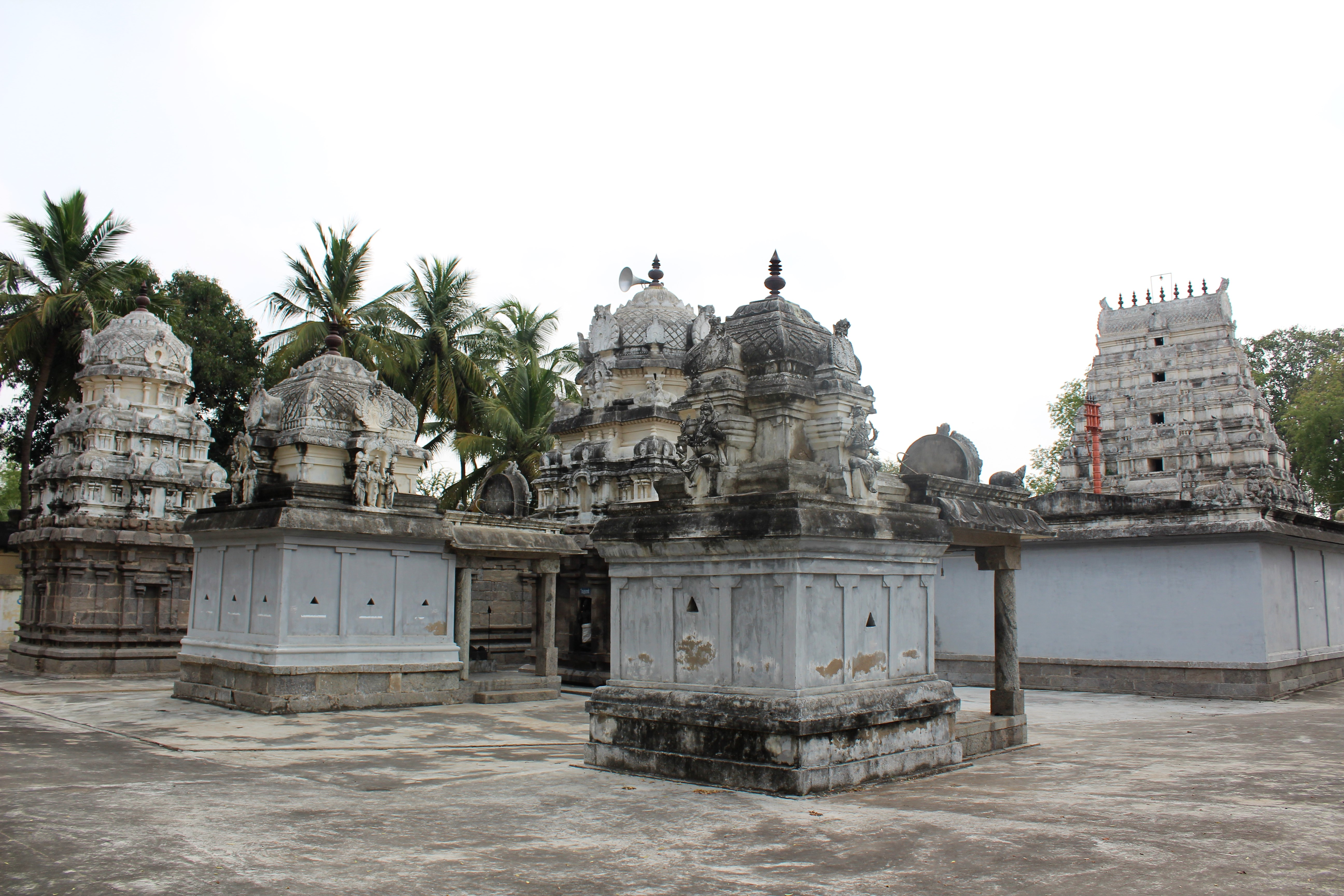
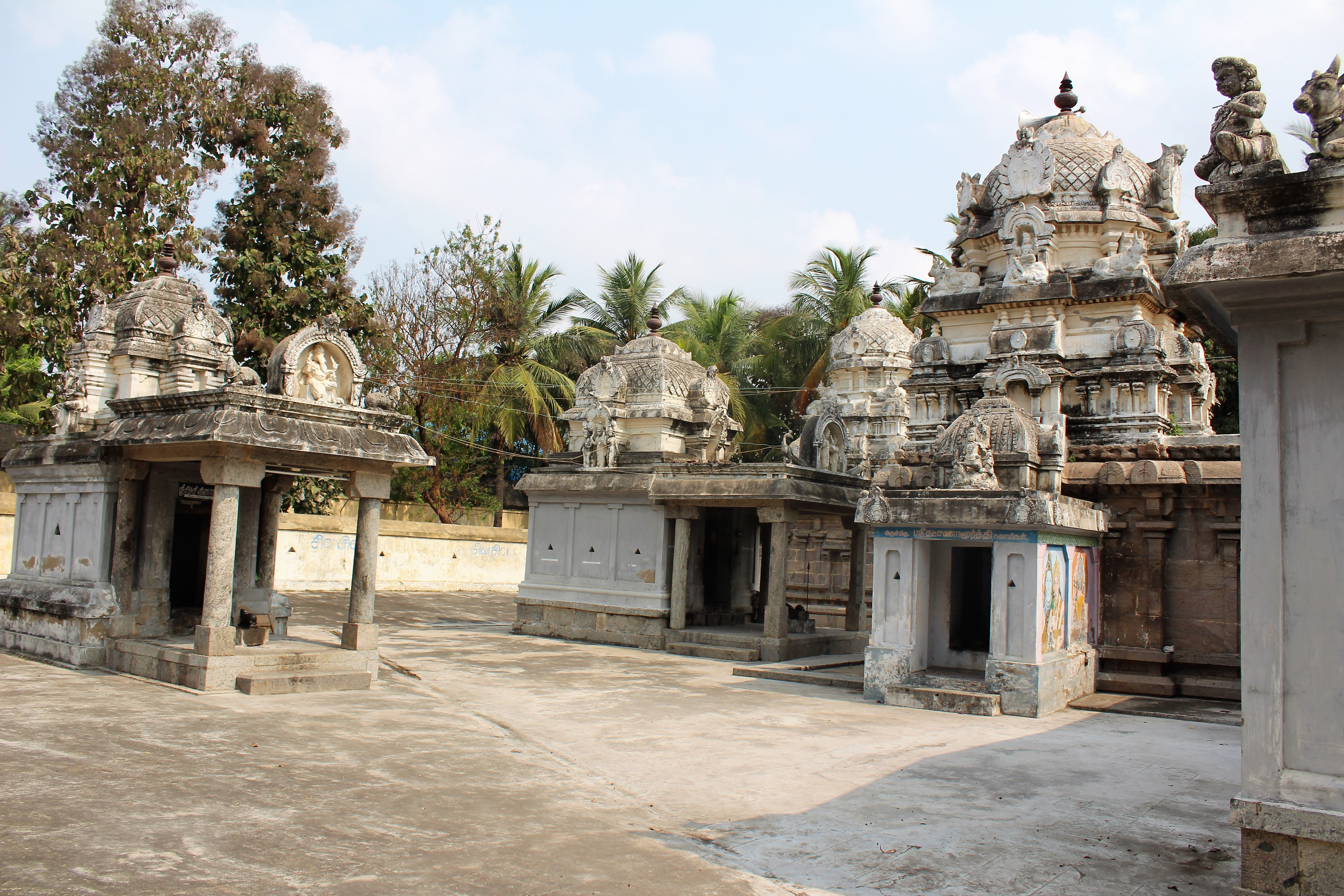
Shrines of the temple

Most of the Chola temples built during the period of 866 and 1004 CE is associated with certain military events or political campaign. During 940 Parantaka I had frequent trouble from invading Rashtrakutas. Takkolam War, dubbed as the greatest war held in the Tamil region, was fought between Cholas and Rashtrakutas. There was a military station in the region during the time of Parantaka, which was headed by his son Rajaditya Chola. The inscriptions from Kannara-deva (Rashtrakuta Krishna III), mentions the Kannaradeva defeating the Cholas and death of Rajaditya during the Takkolam war. Rajaditya was killed with a spear piercing him while he was seated on the elephant. The event gave him the name Anai-merrunjina-deva. The inscriptions from the period of Parantaka mentions that the temple was converted to a stone temple during the reign and the gift of lamps by Rajaditya (mentioned as Vellan Kumaran). The temple has various inscriptions from the period of the Medieval Cholas like Aditya Chola, Rajendra Chola, and Kulothunga Chola and Pandyan kings like Sundarapandithevan and Veerpandithevan. There are other inscriptions from Rashtrakutas, Vijayanagar kings like Virupanna Udayar. In modern times, the temple is administered by the Hindu Religious and Charitable Endowments Department of the Government of Tamil Nadu.

It is one of the shrines of the 275 Paadal Petra Sthalams - Shiva Sthalams mentioned in the early medieval Tevaram poems by Tamil Saivite Nayanars Sambandar.

== Architecture ==
The temple is located on the Villupuram - Thiruvennainallur road. The temple has a seven-tiered gateway tower and all the shrines of the temple are enclosed in concentric rectangular granite walls. The temple occupies an area of around 1.5 acres (0.61 ha). The central shrine houses the image of Sivalokanathar in the form of Lingam. The central shrine is approached through the flagstaff, Mahamandapam and Ardhamandapam, all of which are located axial to the gateway. The sanctum is square in shape measuring 13 ft (4.0 m). The Ardhamandapa measures 9 ft (2.7 m) from east to west. The central shrine has entrance towards South and can be approached circumbulating the shrine. The temple tank is located outside the main entrance tower.

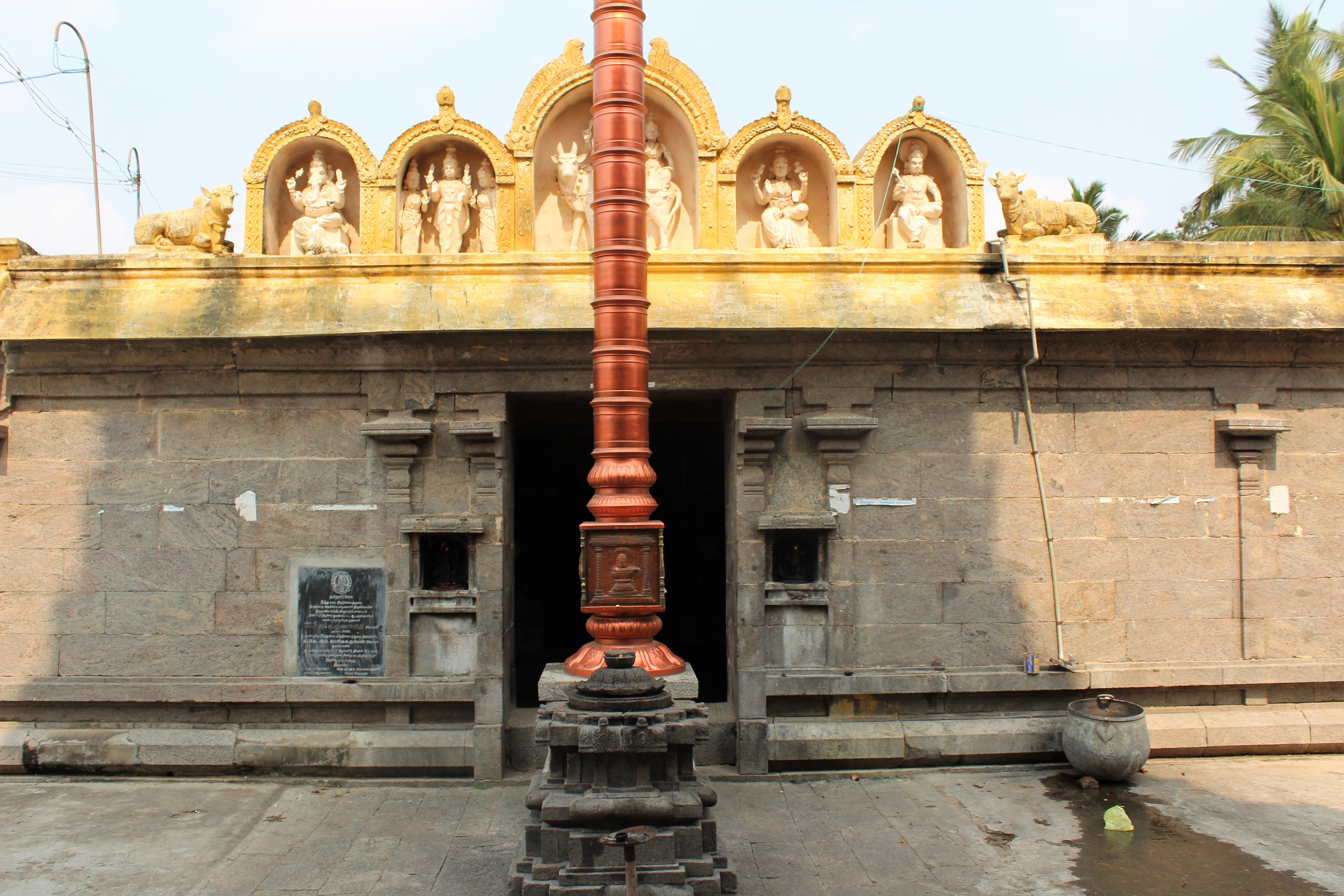
The temple tank in front of the temple
