= Goda Ravi =

Ruler of the Chera Kingdom
- Reign: 905/06–c. 943/44 AD
- Predecessor: Goda Goda (or) Kerala Kesari
- Successor: Indu/Indesvaran Goda
- House: Medieval Cheras of Kerala
- Religion: Hinduism

Goda Ravi (fl. 905/06–c. 943/44 AD) was a Chera Perumal king of medieval Kerala, southern India. The reign of Goda Ravi witnessed strengthened ties between the Cheras and the Cholas, as numerous Kerala military personnel served under the Chola prince Rajaditya in the Tamil country.

Temple inscriptions mentioning Goda Ravi have been discovered in central and north-central Kerala. These records refer, among other things, to several Chera royals — princes titled "Koyil" or "Ala-Koyil" and queens or princesses called Cheraman Maha Devi or Ravi Piratti — as well as the chieftains of Vembanadu (Alappuzha) and Valluvanadu, the latter bearing the title "Rayira Ravar". The inscriptions also mention the so-called "Agreement of Muzhikkulam". It is also known that the deposed Pandya ruler Rajasimha II took refuge with the Cheras, or Keralas, around 920 AD.

Goda Ravi was formerly identified with king Vijayaraga (c. 883/84 — c. 895 AD) of the medieval Chera dynasty of Kerala. He was also initially identified as the brother-in-law of the Pandya ruler Jatavarman Kulasekhara Deva I (the Shermadevi inscription).

== Identification with Vijayaraga ==
Goda Ravi was formerly tentatively identified with king Vijayaraga of the Chera dynasty of Kerala. Vijayaraga appears in three records: the Quilon Syrian copper plates (849 AD); an undated inscription of a Chera princess (the daughter of Kulasekhara and the wife of Vijayaraga); and a Thiruvotriyur inscription (936 AD, 29th regnal year) of Parantaka I, which mentions the daughter of the Chera king Vijayaraga ("Ravi Neeli alias Kizhan Adikal").

The identification of Goda Ravi with Vijayaraga was based on the assumption that the personal name of Vijayaraga was "Ravi", since his daughter's name was Ravi Neeli. The then-accepted late date of the Quilon Syrian copper plates (c. 883 AD; the second set) also supported this identification, since the last regnal year of Goda Ravi Vijayaraga was then suggested to have been around 913 AD.

In his 2020 study, edited by the noted Kerala historian Kesavan Veluthat, the scholar Manu Devadevan rejected the coronation year of Goda Ravi as c. 883 AD and categorically separated Vijayaraga from Goda Ravi.

== Coronation year ==
An inscription of Goda Ravi from Nedumpuram Thali temple at Thichoor, Wadakkanchery, concerning a land grant, is one of rare medieval Chera inscriptions that record both a regnal year and another era (the Kali Year) simultaneously. The regnal year appears at the beginning of the inscription (17th year, with Jupiter in Mithuna), while the Kali Year appears at the end. Recent interpretations suggest that the temple committee met and approved the land grant in the 17th regnal year of Goda Ravi, when Jupiter was in Mithuna, whereas the inscription presently available was commissioned later, corresponding to Kali Year 4030.

Nedumpuram Thali Inscription
| | Kali Year Reading | Corresponding Year | Position of Jupiter | Interpretation | Coronation Year (17 years before) |
|---|---|---|---|---|---|
| A. G. Warrier | 'nālāyirattumuppatu' ('4030') | 929/30 AD | Jupiter in Makaram | ☒ | 912 AD |
| Elamkulam P. N. K. Pillai | 'nālāyirattumuppat[tancu].' ('4035') | 934 AD | Jupiter in Mithuna | ☒ | 917 AD |
| M. G. S. Narayanan | 'nālāyirattumoppatu' ('done in 4000') | 900 AD | Jupiter in Mithuna | ☒ | 883 AD |
| Present view (Devadevan; Ed. Veluthat) | 'nālāyirattumuppatu' ('4030') = 929/30 AD | 922 AD (agreement year) | Jupiter in Mithuna | check | 905/06 AD |
| Present view (Devadevan; Ed. Veluthat) | 'nālāyirattumuppatu' ('4030') = 929/30 AD | 929/30 AD (commission year) | Jupiter not in Mithuna | check | |

== Epigraphic records ==
Note: Material—granite; Script—Vattezhuthu (with some Grantha characters); Language—old Malayalam (unless otherwise stated).

| No. | Year | Regnal Year | Location | Contents | |
| No. | Year | Regnal Year | Location | Nature | Notes |
|---|---|---|---|---|---|
| 1 | - | Nil | Thrikkalangode inscription - Meledath Mahashiva Vettakkorumakan temple, Thrikkalangode, Manjeri - (a stone paved on the circumambulatory path in front of the circular sanctum sanctorum) | Temple inscription | Mentions Moozhikkalam system. |
| 2 | 918/19 AD | 13 | Airanikkulam (Iranikulam) inscription | Temple inscription | Published in a 'form that is far from satisfactory'.; Donor to the temple is certain Ravi Piratti (Chera princess).; The committee also included the "senapathi" (chief of the royal militia?) |
| 3 | 920/21 AD | 15 | Chokkur inscription (Chokoor, Puthur village) - near Koduvally - single granite slab in courtyard of the ruined Chokkur Temple. | Temple inscription (by founder Karkodupurathu Kadamba Kumara) | Donor is a person known as Karkodupurathu Kadamba Kumara.; Earliest record to refer the 'Agreement of Muzhikkulam'.; Third face of the stone contains a separate inscription (mentioning a "nangaiyar") |
| 4 | 922 and 929/30 AD | 17 | Nedumpuram Thali inscription, Thichoor Wadakkanchery (Thali inscriptions of Cochin State) - two granite slabs fixed into the half wall in the entrance corridor on the left side of Nedumpuram Thali. | Temple committee resolutions | Dated in Kali Year 4030 (=929/30 AD).: Two halves of the record on two separate slabs (one with the regnal year and the other one with the date in Kali Era) were initially registered separately.; Council is attended by the chieftain of Vembanadu (Alappuzha) called Goda Ravi. |
| 5 | 925/26 AD | 20 | Avittathur inscription I - single granite slab paved in the courtyard of the Avittathur Temple near the sopana. | Temple committee resolutions | Mentions the Cheraman Maha Devi (the Chera queen).; The council is attended the Rayira Ravar (the chieftain of Valluvanad or the Leader of the Thousand). |
| 6 | 925/26 AD | 20 | Avittathur inscription II - single granite slab paved in the courtyard of the Avittathur Temple to the right of the srikoyil (a few feet away from sopana). | Temple committee resolutions | The council is attended the Rayira Ravar (the chieftain of Valluvanadu or the Leader of the Thousand). |
| 7 | 925/26 AD | 20 | Avittathur inscription III - single granite slab paved in the courtyard of the Avittathur Temple (a few feet away from sopana). | Temple committee resolutions | The council is attended the Rayira Ravar (the chieftain of Valluvanadu or the Leader of the Thousand). |
| 8 | 932/33 AD | 27 | Triprangode inscription (originally in Sri Krishna shrine, Triprangode Shiva Temple) - now in Archeological Museum, Trichur. | Temple committee resolutions | Mentions the Agreement of Tavanur.; Council is attended by the Ala-koyil (a Chera prince). |
| 9 | 932/33 AD | 27 | Porangattiri/Porangattur inscription (Chaliyar) - single granite slab in the courtyard of the Porangattiri Temple. | Temple committee resolutions | Cites the Agreement of Muzhikkulam.; Council is attended by the Koyil and the Ala-koyil (a Chera prince). |
| 10 | 932/33 AD | 27 | Indianur inscription (Kottakkal) - originally at Indianur Temple - now in Department of History, Calicut University. | Temple committee resolutions | A slab with inscriptions of two separate Chera-Perumals on either side.; Council is attended by the Koyil (a Chera prince). |
| 11 | 935/36 AD | 30 | Thrippunithura inscription (originally from Santhana Gopalakrishna Temple, Thrippunithura) - now in Archeological Museum, Trichur. | Temple committee resolutions | Council is attended by Ravi Aditya, a minister ("amaichi") and a Chera prince. |
