= Vellan Kumaran =

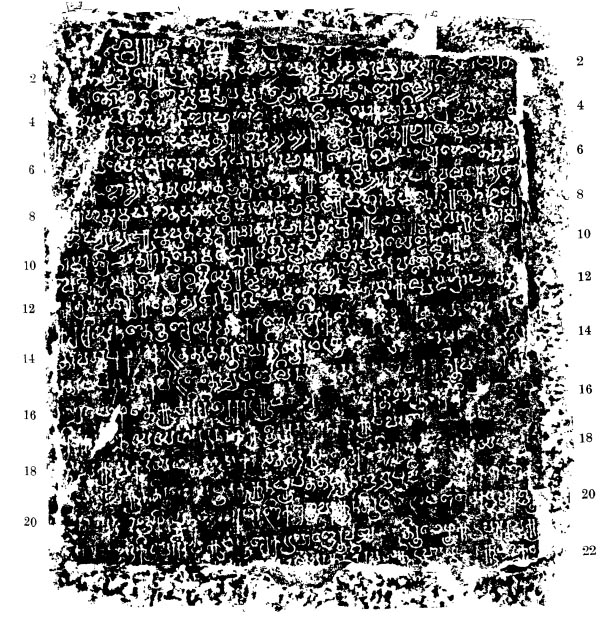
- Tiruvorriyur Inscription of Chaturanana Pandita
- Born: Nandikkarai Puttur (Kerala)
- Relatives: Rajasekhara (father, the chieftain of Valluvanatu)
- Military career
- Allegiance: Chola Empire
- Rank: Perumpatai Nayaka
- Nickname: Chaturanana Pandita
- Conflicts: Battle of Takkolam (948/49 CE)

Vellan Kumaran (fl. mid-10th century AD), diksa name Chaturanana Pandita, was a Kerala commander in the Chola army and a close confidant of prince Rajaditya. He was probably one of the few Chola commanders to survive the battle of Takkolam (948/49 CE). Kumaran is best known for engraving his own autobiography in an inscription at Tiruvotriyur (Madras) around ten years after becoming an ascetic.

Vellan Kumaran ("Valabha Guha") was the son of Rajasekhara, the chieftain of Valluvanatu in Kerala. He is also described in records as a native of "Nandikkarai Puttur" in Kerala (the Malai Natu). The inscriptions state that, after "completing education in his boyhood", he went to Chola country and became a commander under prince Rajaditya in the Chola army.

After the battle of Takkolam, Kumaran became an ascetic and settled at Tiruvotriyur as a disciple of a teacher named "Niranjana Guru". Eventually Kumaran, now known as "Chaturanana Pandita", founded a matha (the Kalamukha monastery) at Tiruvotriyur. The true significance of Vellan Kumaran's life was discovered by historian V. Raghavan.

== Background ==
=== Chola defeat at Takkolam ===
The battle of Takkolam (948/49 AD) was a military engagement fought between a contingent of troops led by the Chola prince Rajaditya and another led by the Rashtrakuta king Krishna III (939–967 AD). The battle resulted in the death of Rajaditya on the battlefield and the defeat of the Chola garrison at Takkolam.

The Rashtrakutas subsequently conquered eastern and northern parts of the Chola empire and advanced as far as Rameswaram. According to the Karhad copper plates of Krishna III (959 AD), the king "uprooted the Cholas, distributed their territory among his followers, and extracted tribute from the Chera and Pandya kings" during his campaign. The Sravana Belgola record of the Ganga king Marasimha (963–975 AD) also claims victory over the Chera king on behalf of his predecessor, Butuga II.

The death of prince Rajaditya was commemorated by the Chola family in an unusual manner. The Chola version of the events is recorded in the Larger Leiden Grant (1006 CE) of Rajaraja I and the Tiruvalangadu Plates (1018 CE) of Rajendra I.

=== Kerala military personnel at Takkolam ===
Prince Rajaditya was the son of the Ko Kizhan Atikal, the medieval Chera princess of Kerala, and the Chola king Parantaka I (907–955 AD). It is known that the Ko Kizhan Atikal, the mother of prince Rajaditya, stayed for some time at Rajadityapura (Tirunavalur/Tirumanallur) during the 28th regnal year of Parantaka (c. 935 AD), along with her entire royal entourage.

It is also recorded that prince Rajaditya commanded a large contingent of Kerala military personnel in Tirumunaippati Natu as early as the 930s.

Country	Chiefdom or clan name	Location inside chiefdom	Name
Malaiyala	Maluvacchar (Kizhamalai Natu?)		Attankan Chattan
Malaiyala	Netunkalai Natu (Netunganatu?)	Isanamangalam (Iswaramangalam?)	Manavallan Kannan
Malaiyala			Iravi Kotai
Malaiyala	Netumpuraiyur Natu (Netumpuram Tali)	Vakkanatu, Mankarai	Kantan Kaman
Malaiyala	Kantiyur Vel Kula (Venatu?)		Sundaran
Malaiyala		Tirukunrappozha (Thrikkunnappuzha)	Parivarattu Chevakan, Chenta Kumaran
Malai Natu	Matai Vazhkai		Iyakkan Iraman

According to historians, the mid-10th century witnessed a large migration of Kerala people into the Chola country in search of "commercial profit and military adventure". A warrior named "Malaiyana Otrai Chevakan" appears in the army of prince Arikulaseri in an inscription from Kizhur, South Arcot. Several merchants, mostly from Kodungallur in Malai Nadu, are also mentioned in inscriptions found at Kudumiya Malai (Pudukkottah), Tirucchanur (South Arcot), Udaiyargudi (South Arcot), Tirumalpurarm (North Arcot), and Tiruvenkatu.

== Inscriptions of Vellan Kumaran or Chaturanana Pandita ==
=== As Vellan Kumaran ===
Inscription	Date	Notes
Gramam, South Arcot	29th regnal year of Parantaka I (936 AD)	Records a gift of sheep for perpetual lamp in the shrine of Srimulasthanattu Mahadeva at Atrutali in Tirumutiyur by Vellan Kumaran of Nandikkarai Puttur in Malai Natu (who was a commander - perumpatai nayakan - of prince Rajaditya).
Gramam, South Arcot	36th regnal year of Parantaka I (943 AD): Kali Year - 4044; Kali Day - 1477037	Vellan Kumaran, the Kerala commander of prince Rajaditya, built a stone temple of Atruttali Mahadeva at Mauligrama (Mutiyur) on the Pennai river.; Adjectives of Vellan Kumaran - "Chamu Nayaka", "Cholarkal Mulabhrtya", "Perumpatai Nayaka" and "Uttamah Keralanam".; Birthplace is mentioned as "Puttur".

=== As Chaturanana Pandita ("Valabha Guha") ===
Inscription	Date	Notes
Tiruvotriyur, Madras	18th regnal year Krishna III Rashtrakuta	Chaturanana Pandita as the recipient of a donation to the temple.
Tiruvotriyur, Madras	20th regnal year Krishna III Rashtrakuta (959 AD)	Found on a slab in the floor of Shiva temple at Tiruvotriyur.; Described as "Valabha Rashtra Natha".; Says that Valabha, resembling god Guha (Kumaran), son of Rajasekhara, chieftain of Vallabha Rashtra in Kerala, went to Chola country after completing education (in his boyhood) and became a loyal subordinate of Rajaditya.; Since Valabha was not fortunate enough to die along with his master (in the battle of Takkolam), he felt that he had disgraced his caste, (Vallabha) family, father (Rajasekhara) and master (Rajaditya) by his action and turned away from life. After the bath at Triveni (on the Ganges) he accepted vratas from Niranjana Guru and assumed the name of Chaturanana.; Chaturanana donated 100 nishkas (pieces) of gold to the sabha of Narasimha Mangalam (an agrahara) on his birthday on dhanishta naksatra.; The interest (three mashas per nishka per year) on the 100 nishkas gold was to fund the performance of a special puja to Siva at Tiruvotriyur on the occasion of his natal constellation, the dhanishta naksatra.; Chaturanana Pandita is described as chief abbot of the Kalamukha Saiva monastery in Tiruvotriyur
