= Arasaleeswarar temple =

Hindu temple in Tamil Nadu, India

Arasaleeswarar Temple
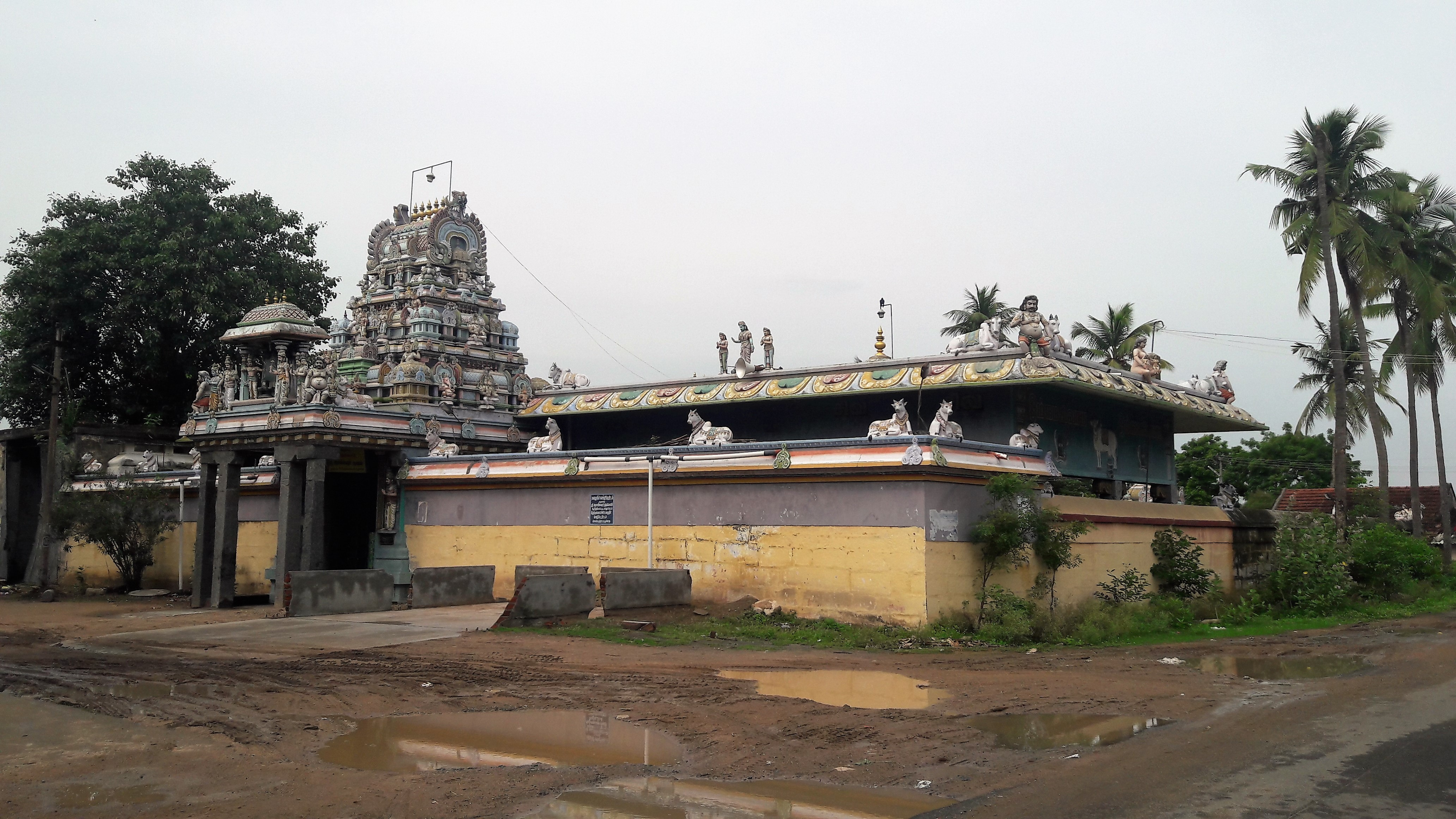

- Location in Tamil Nadu

Religion
- Affiliation: Hinduism
- District: Villupuram
- Deity: Arasaleeswarar(Shiva)

Location
- State: Tamil Nadu
- Country: India
- Coordinates: 12°03′09″N 79°46′22″E

Architecture
- Type: South Indian architecture

Arasaleeswarar Temple (also called Arasili) is a Hindu temple dedicated to the deity Shiva, located in Olindiyampattu, a village in Villupuram district in the South Indian state of Tamil Nadu. Shiva is worshipped as Arasaleeswarar, and is represented by the lingam. His consort Parvati is depicted as Periyanaayagi. The presiding deity is revered in the 7th century Tamil Saiva canonical work, the Tevaram, written by Tamil saint poets known as the Nayanars and classified as Paadal Petra Sthalam.

The temple complex covers around one acre and entered through a three tiered gopuram, the main gateway. The temple has a number of shrines, with those of Arasaleeswarar and his consort Periyanayagi, being the most prominent. All the shrines of the temple are enclosed in large concentric rectangular granite walls.

The temple has four daily rituals at various times from 6:00 a.m. to 7:00 p.m., and four yearly festivals on its calendar. The Brahmotsavam festival is celebrated during the month of the Vaikasi (May - June) is the most prominent festival.

The original complex is believed to have been built by Cholas, while the present masonry structure was built by chieftains during the 16th century. In modern times, the temple is maintained and administered by the Hindu Religious and Charitable Endowments Department of the Government of Tamil Nadu.

== Legend ==
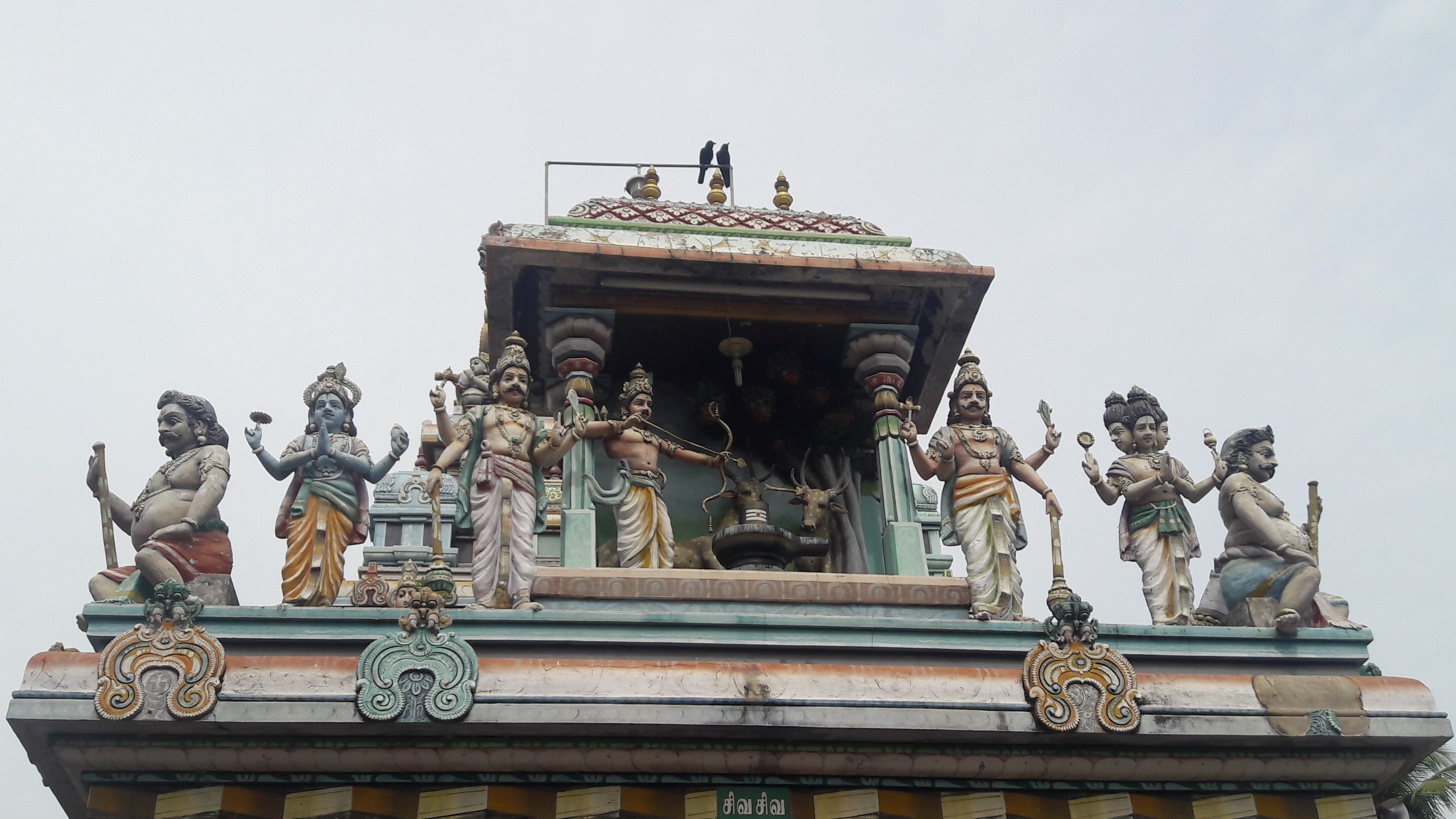
Legend of the temple

As per Hindu legend, sage Vamadeva visited many temples to worship Shiva. He came to the place and was standing under an Arasu tree (peepli tree) and felt that it would be nice if Shiva appeared in the place. Pleased by the devotion of the sage, Shiva appeared in the place of the Arasu tree and came to be known as Arasaleeswarar and the place came to be known as Arasili. As per another legend, a king named Sathyavardhan who ruled the place was a staunch devotee of Shiva. He installed a garden to garner flowers for his worship. Each day the gardener complained that someone stole the flowers of the garden. The king found that a deer was eating the flowers of the garden. Angered at the deer, the king shot an arrow at it which missed its mark but hit the Arasu tree behind. The king found that blood was oozing out from the Arasu tree, which the king found out to be the incarnation of Shiva. The scar mark in the Lingam of the temple is believed to be the arrow hit by the king.

== History ==
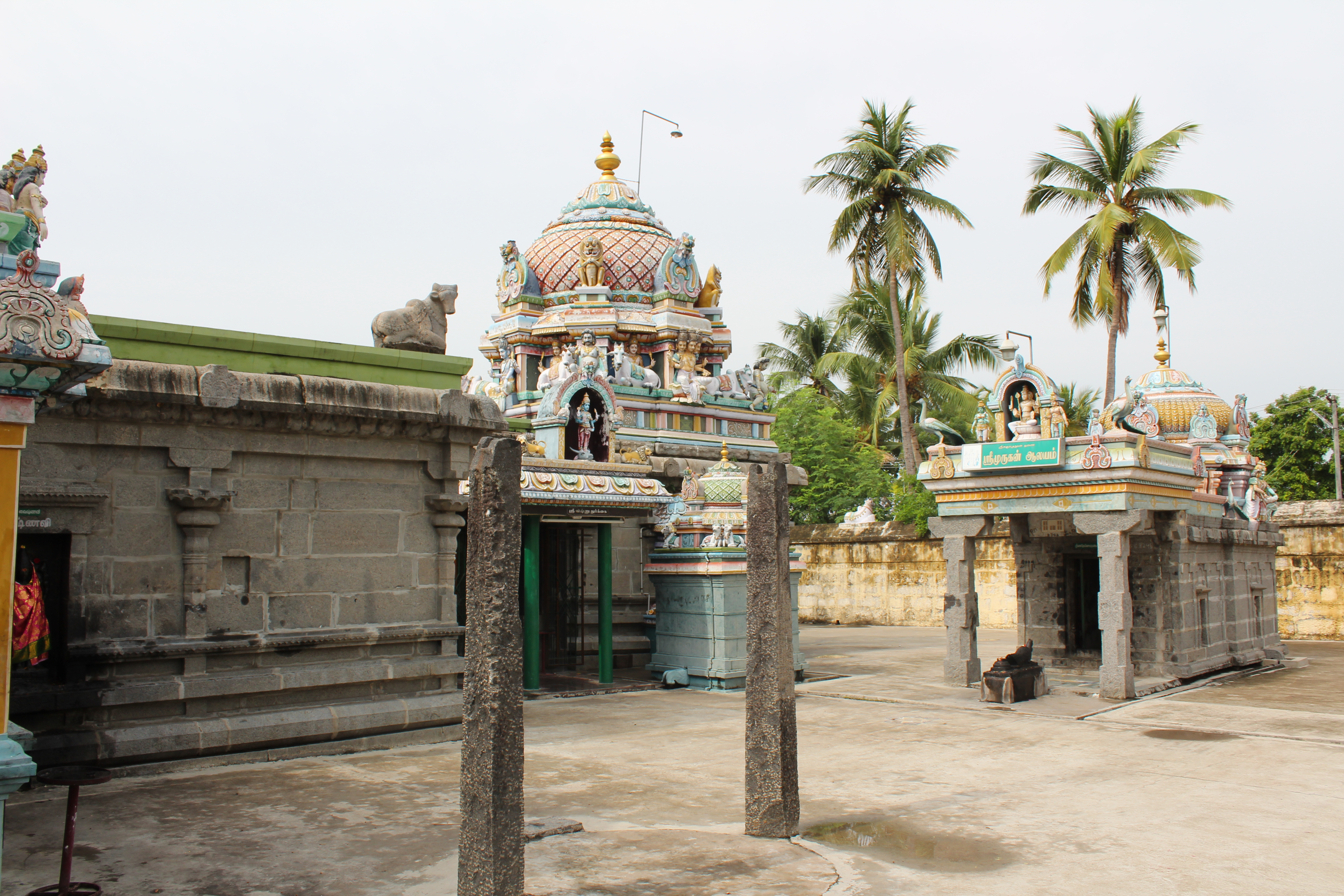
A shrine in the temple

Most of the Chola temples built during the period of 866 and 1004 CE is associated with certain military events or political campaign. During 940 Parantaka I had frequent trouble from invading Rashtrakutas. Takkolam War, dubbed as the greatest war held in the Tamil region, was fought between Cholas and Rashtrakutas. Parantaka's son Rajaditya was killed in the campaign and Krishna III assumed the name "conqueror of Tanjai and Kanchi". The temple has five inscriptions from the period of the Medieval Cholas like Vikrama Chola and Kulothunga Chola. In modern times, the temple is administered by the Hindu Religious and Charitable Endowments Department of the Government of Tamil Nadu. The bronze idols of the temple were stolen and were later restored by idol wing of Tamil Nadu Police during 2009.

== Festivals and religious importance ==
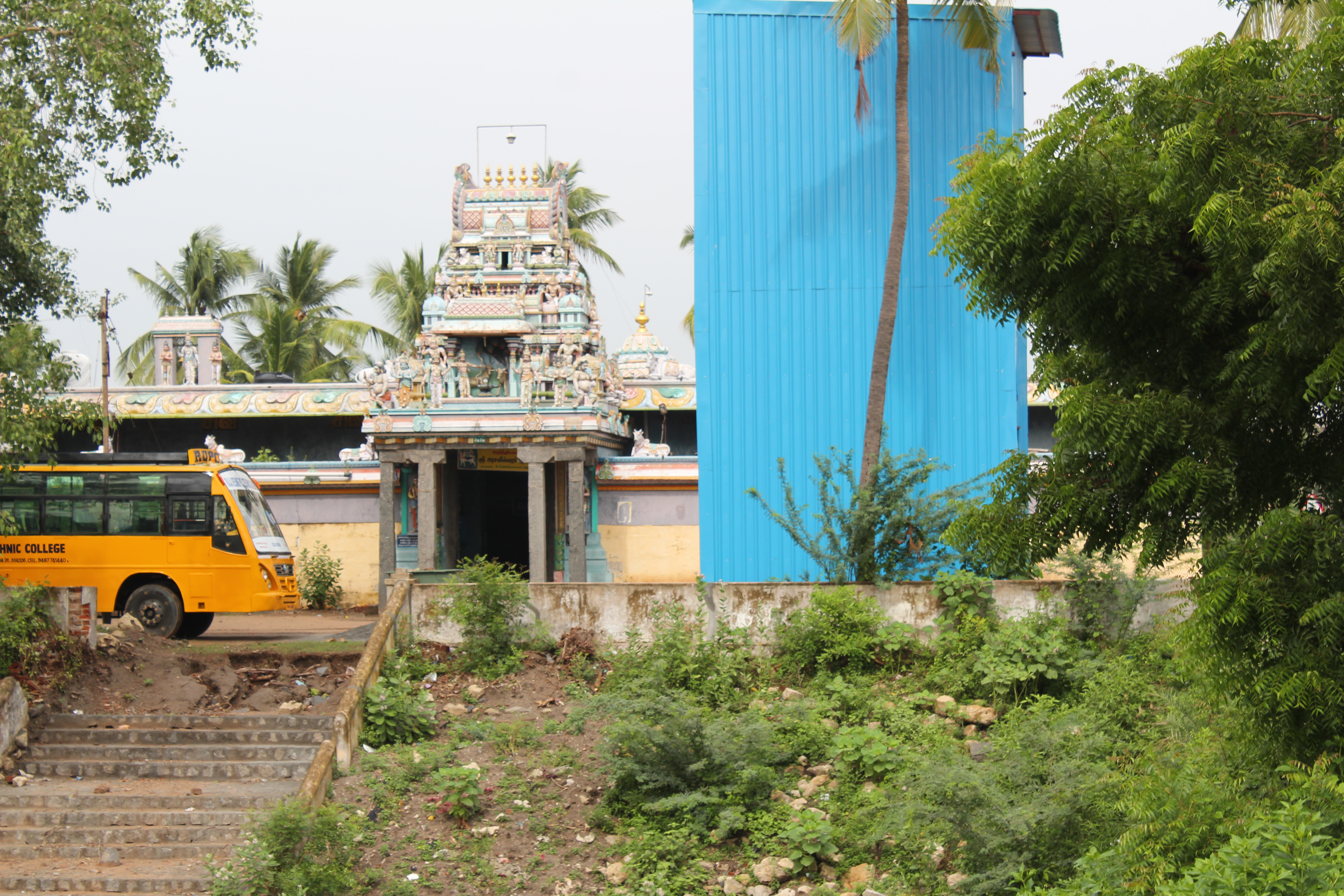
The temple tank in front of the temple

It is one of the shrines of the 275 Paadal Petra Sthalams - Shiva Sthalams mentioned in the early medieval Tevaram poems.
