= Kadambanallur =

Coordinates: 13.011523°N 79.697916°E

Kadambanallur is a village located in Vellore District of Tamil Nadu. Part of the people were the settlers from Chennai (Madras) who migrated during the freedom struggle in 1950.

== Occupation ==
The main occupations are agriculture, pottery, and skilled masons. Agriculture is done year round and includes paddy, groundnut, vegetables (mainly bringal, lady finder, and cucumber), offlate flowers (includes marigold, rose, hibiscus, jasmine, and firecracker). It is about 60 km from west of Chennai, 10 km from south of Arakkonam, and 25 km from north of Kanchipuram. Takkolam railway station is nearby railway station.

Kadambanallur belongs to Mangattucherri Punchayat. People celebrate "Chithirai Festival" at may month of every year.

== Schools ==
- Government High School
- Punjayat Union Middle School

== Library ==
- Kadambanallur Library

== Temples ==
- Vinayagar Temple
- Sri Prasanna Venkatesha Perumal Temple
- Ponniamman Temple
- Chandiragiri Amman Temple
- Jalagandeshwarar Temple
- Padavattam Amman Temple
