= Atakur inscription =

10th-century inscription in Karnataka, India

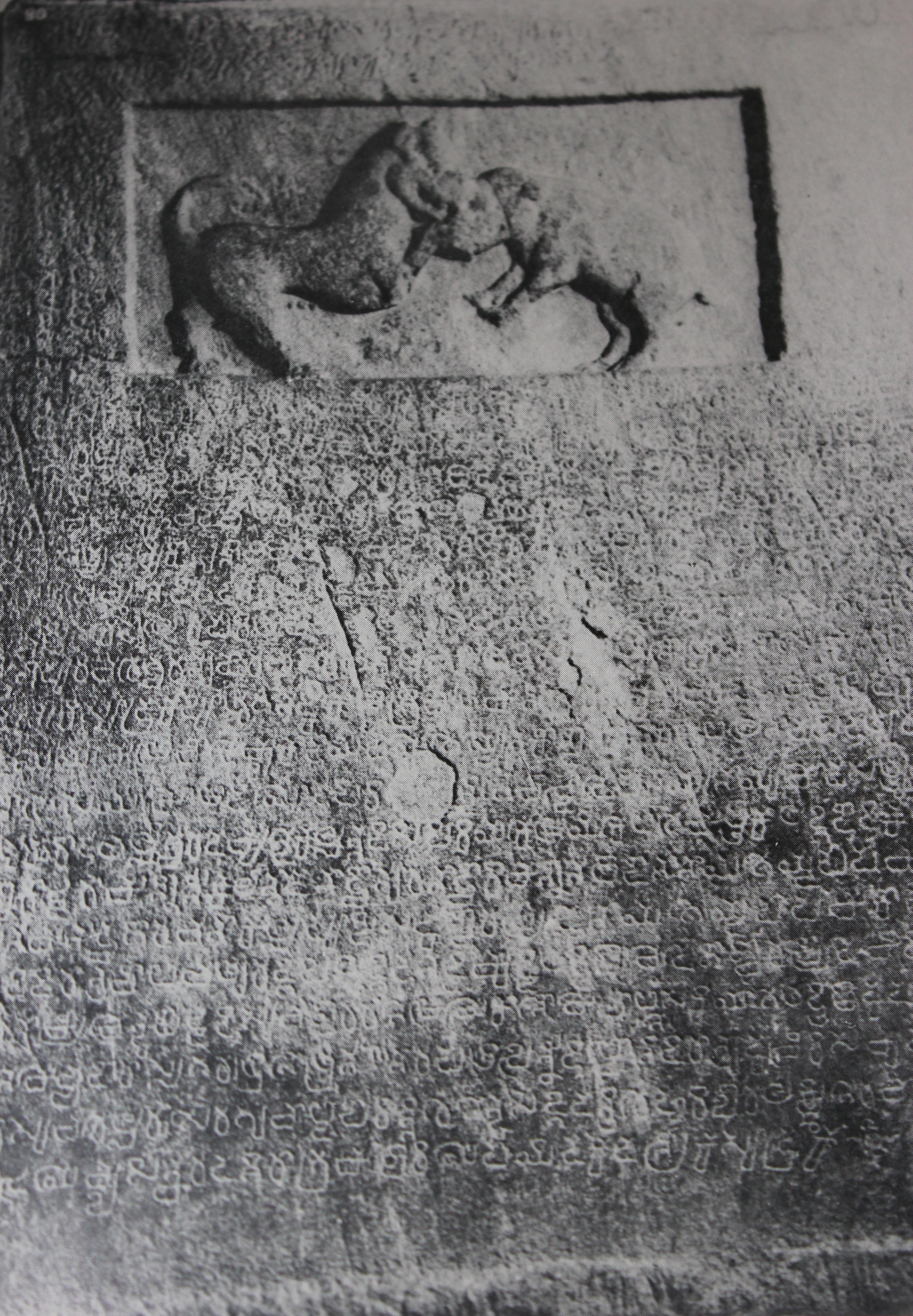
The famous Atakur inscription (949 C.E.), a classical Kannada composition from the Western Ganga-Rashtrakuta period

The Atakur inscription (sometimes spelt Athakur, Athagur, Athkur, Atkur or Atukur) dated 949-950 C.E. is an inscribed memorial stone (hero stone) in classical Kannada composition. It was discovered at the Chelleshvara temple at Atakur village, about 23 km from Mandya, Karnataka, India. The "motion packed" sculptured hero stone describes two events in poetic Kannada; the battle between "Kali" the hound and a wild boar, and the victory of Rashtrakuta Emperor Krishna III over the Chola dynasty of Tanjore in the battle of Takkolam. According to historians I. K. Sarma and Singh, memorial stones for warriors are common in medieval India, but one erected in memory of an animal is considered unique.

== Content ==
The many battles fought between the Rashtrakuta dynasty (with the support of their vassal King Butuga II of the Western Ganga Dynasty) and the Cholas of Tanjore have been the subject of many a medieval hero stone. It is known from this inscription, which is dated to 949-950 C.E (saka 872), that King Butuga II had a favorite hound called "Kali" which helped a warrior named Manlarata (or Manalera, an aid-de-camp of Butuga II) fight the Chola king Rajaditya on the battlefield. Manlarata, whom the inscription refers to as Valabhipuravaresvara ("Lord of Vallabhi"), was able to drive the Chola armies away while King Butuga II, riding an elephant on the battlefield, killed the Chola King. In the inscription, the Rashtrakuta Emperor Krishna III showers high praise on Butuga II for his achievement (the Neralige inscription illustrates in more detail the battle of Takkolam). Manalarata, whose valor is poetically described in the inscription, requested Butuga II to give him the brave hound in return for his exploits on the battlefield.

In a separate incident, during a hunt, the hound was involved in a fight with a wild boar in a trench near the village of Beltur, leading to the death of both animals in the conflict. This inscribed memorial stone was erected by a grief-stricken Manlarata in honor of the brave dog. The inscription warns the local priest (gorava) of "sin" if he were to have his food before "offering worship to the memorial stone". According to historian Shadakshari Settar, the gorava mentioned in the inscription is a Shaiva priest, whereas Ferdinand Kittel considers him a Shaiva mendicant. Commemorating his victory in battle, Emperor Krishna III gifted his vassal King Butuga II large areas of his kingdom, including the provinces of Banavasi-12000, Belavola-300, Purugere-300, Kisukad-70 and the Bagenad-70. Butuga II gifted his faithful warrior Manlarata the villages of Atakur-12 and Koteyur.
