= Vijayaraga =

Ruler of the Chera Kingdom
- Reign: c. 883/84—c. 895 AD
- Predecessor: Rama Rajasekhara
- Successor: Goda Goda (or) Kerala Kesari
- Spouse: Kizhan Adikal Ravi Neeli
- Issue: Kizhan Adikal Ravi Neeli
- House: Chera (medieval Kerala)
- Religion: Hinduism

Vijayaraga (fl. c. 849—895 AD), also known as Jayaraga, was a Chera ruler of medieval Kerala who reigned from c. 883/84 to c. 895 AD. The period of Vijayaraga likely witnessed the expansion of medieval Chera influence into the neighboring Ay and Ezhimala countries (southern and northern Kerala).

Vijayaraga appears as a royal prince as early as the fifth regnal year of the Chera king Sthanu Ravi Kulasekhara (c. 849 AD). Records indicate that he married Kulasekhara's daughter, called "Kizhan Adikal Ravi Neeli". An inscription referring to this princess has been discovered in the southern Ay country. It is also possible that Vijayaraga was the nephew (sister's son) of Kulasekhara. Vijayaraga's daughter, "Ravi Neeli" or "Kizhan Adikal ", was married to the Chola king Parantaka I.

Vijayaraga was formerly identified with king Goda Ravi (r. 905/06—c. 943/44) of the medieval Chera dynasty of Kerala.

== Sources ==
=== Inscriptions ===
- Quilon Syrian copper plates (849 AD) — Mentioned as the royal prince (the Koyil Adhikarikal) under king Sthanu Ravi (r. 844/45—c. 870/71 AD).
- Thirunandikkara inscription — inscription of a medieval Chera princess (the Kizhan Adikal Ravi Neeli), the wife of Vijayaraga and the daughter of Kulasekhara.
- Thiruvotriyur inscription (936 AD, 29th regnal year) — inscription of a medieval Chera princess (Kizhan Adikal alias Ravi Neel), the wife of the Chola king Parantaka I and the daughter of the Chera or Kerala ruler "Vijayaraga".

=== Battle with the Ezhimala rulers ===
Vijayaraga is likely the same ruler described as the Kerala king "Jayaraga" in the Mushika Vamsa Kavya, an 11th-century dynastic chronicle from the northern Ezhimala country. According to the kavya, Jayaraga married the daughter of Kunchi Varma, the Ezhimala ruler of that period.

The text also states that Vijayaraga later led a military expedition to the Ezhimala country against his brother-in-law Ishana, with the opposing forces reportedly meeting on the banks of the Parassini or Kottappuzha river. It was apparently Goda Varma "Keralaketu", the son of Jayaraga, who eventually re-established an uneasy peace between the two countries, with Jayaraga receiving tribute.
