= Parantaka I =

Chola emperor from 907 to 955

- Parakesari Varman, Maduraium Eelamum Konda Parakesarivarman, Veera Cholan, Irumudi Cholan
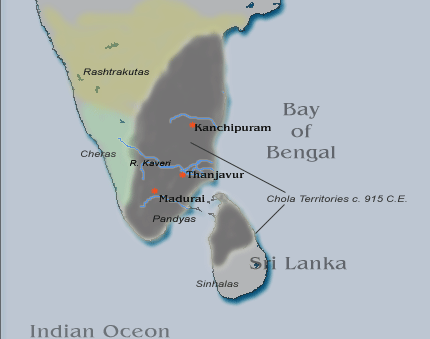
- Chola Empire under Parantaka Chola I in 915 CE

Chola Emperor
- Reign: 907–955
- Predecessor: Aditya I
- Successor: Gandaraditya
- Born: Veera Narayanan; 873; Tiruvottiyur, Chola Empire (Modern day Chennai Tamil Nadu, India)
- Died: 955 (aged 81–82); Tiruvottiyur, Chola Empire (Modern day Chennai Tamil Nadu, India)
- Consorts: 11 Total; Including: Ko "Kizhan Adigal" Iravi Nili; Solamadeviyar
- Issue: Rajaditya; Gandaraditya; Uttamasili; Arinjaya; Viramadevi; Anupama.
- Dynasty: Chola
- Father: Aditya I
- Mother: Tribhuvanamadeviyar
- Religion: Hinduism

Parantaka Chola I (r. 907–955; Tamil: பராந்தக சோழன், romanized: Parintaka Cōḻaṉ), also known as Vīracōḻaṉ and Maturai Koṇṭāṉ, was a Chola king who reigned in the early tenth century CE. He continued the expansion begun by his father, Aditya I, conquering and annexing territories in several directions. He annexed the Pandya kingdom, extended Chola power southwards to Kanyakumari and northwards towards Nellore, and brought the Gangas into a subordinate alliance while maintaining friendly relations with the Cheras.

== Invasion of the Pandya kingdom ==
Parantaka I continued the expansion begun by his father and invaded the Pandya kingdom, He captured the Pandyan capital, Madurai, early in his reign and assumed the title Maturai Koṇṭāṉ (Capturer of Madurai) by the third year of his reign.

The Mahavamsa describes the conflict in three stages. In the first, the Pandyan king was defeated by Parantaka, after which Parantaka adopted the title Madhurantaka Maturai Koṇṭāṉ). In the second, the Pandyan king sought assistance from the ruler of Ceylon, and the combined Pandyan and Ceylonese forces were defeated and forced to retreat by the Chola army. The Mahavamsa further records a subsequent attempt by the Ceylonese commander, which ended after a plague killed him and led to the withdrawal of the Ceylonese army. Chola inscriptions corroborate the first two stages but do not mention the subsequent campaign or the plague.

The decisive battle appears to have taken place at Vellur around 915. The Pandyan ruler Maravarman Rajasinha II sought the help of Kassapa V of Anuradhapura, who sent an army to his aid. Parantaka defeated the combined army at the Battle of Vellore, a decisive victory for the Cholas, but this victory was narrow. Two inscriptions from Parantaka's twelfth regnal year make brief references to the battle, recording the defeat of the Pandyan and Ceylonese forces by the Cholas.

Then the Pandya king fled into exile in Sri Lanka, and Parantaka I completed his conquest of the entire Pandya country. Following his victory, Parantaka sought to hold a formal coronation at Madurai and assume the insignia of the Pandyan monarchy. The insignia had been taken to Ceylon by the Pandyan king Rajasinma II and placed in the custody of the Ceylonese king.

== Lankan Expedition ==
After completing his conquest of the Pandya country, Parantaka I sought to consolidate Chola control over the newly conquered territory. He planned to celebrate his victory with a formal coronation at Madurai and assume the royal insignia of the Pandya monarchy. However, these insignia had been taken to Ceylon by the Pandyan king Rajasimha and placed in the custody of the Ceylonese king Dappula IV.

Parantaka I sent a messenger to Ceylon requesting the return of the insignia, but the request was refused by Uday IV the Ceylonese who ruled Ceylon at that time. Parantaka subsequently sent an army to Ceylon. In the ensuing conflict, the Ceylonese commander was killed and the Ceylonese army was routed by Cholas. The Chola army invaded Sri Lanka around 946–947 AD, defeated the Sinhalese army, and sacked Anuradhapura and conquered Northern Lanka. Udaya IV, who had succeeded Dappula IV, moved the Pandyan insignia to Rohana in southeastern Ceylon. Mahavamsa also records that the Lankan king Udaya IV took the Pandya crown and the jewels and hid himself in the Rohana hills. Parantaka's subsequent attempts to recover the insignia were unsuccessful. Later, during the reign of his grandson Rajendra I (1014–1044), the insignia were recovered during the Chola campaign in Sri Lanka. The remaining Sinhalese forces withdrew to Rohana and later returned to Anuradhapura after the Chola army returned to India.

Although the Chola forces retreated with a large amount of plunder, Sri Lankan sources claims a successful counter-invasion by Ceylon and they were able to recover the loot - a disputed event entirely unmentioned in the Chola records and not accepted by historians.

Following his campaigns in the Pandya country and Lanka, Parantaka I assumed the title Maduraiyum Īḻamum Koṇḍa Parakēsarivarman ("Parakesarivarman who conquered Madurai and Lanka").

== War against the Rashtrakutas ==
=== Background ===
Aditya I had two sons, namely Parantaka I and Kannara Deva. The eldest son was Parantaka, born to a Chera wife; the youngest son was Kannara Devan, born to a Rashtrakuta wife. Following Aditya I's death, Rashtrakuta king Krishna II tried to exert his influence in the Chola country by placing his grandson Kannara Deva on the throne.

=== Battle of vallala ===
In 907 CE, Parantaka became king. Disappointed by this, Krishna II invaded the Chola country. On the Rashtrakuta side, prince Indra III led the battle, while the Chola side was led by King Parantaka and Prince Rajaditya. In the year 911, in the Battle of vallala, a large number of Rashtrakuta soldiers died and their army began to weaken. Krishna II withdrew, and his forces retreated. The Cholas advanced, driving the Rashtrakutas completely out of their territory and securing a decisive victory. Parantaka Chola's early series of triumphs included this critical Rashtrakuta War.

=== Conflict with Rashtrakuta feudatories ===
==== Banas and Vaidumbas ====
During the early phase of Parantaka I’s conflict with the Rashtrakuta Empire and its allies, campaigns were directed against the Bana and Vaidumba chiefs. According to K. A. Nilakanta Sastri, the Bana rulers Vikramaditya II and his son Vijayaditya III were defeated in these campaigns, leading to the incorporation of Bana territory under Chola control, at times administered through loyal subordinates. The Vaidumbas, who were associated with the Banas, also appear to have been reduced to submission during this period, with some chiefs seeking refuge in Rashtrakuta domains. These events are generally placed in the early decades of Parantaka I’s reign.

==== Against Nolamba king Iriva Nolamba Diliparaja ====
During the 29th year of Parantaka I's reign, Chola influence appears to have extended into regions near Nolambavadi. A Kannada inscription from this regnal year (c. 936 CE) of parantaka I, found at Bairakur in present-day Karnataka, indicates a possible conflict between Parantaka I and the Nolamba ruler Iriva Nolamba Diliparaja, a feudatory of the Rashtrakuta Empire. While the evidence is not conclusive, some historians suggest that this encounter may have ended in favour of the Cholas, pointing to a possible success of Parantaka I over a Rashtrakuta subordinate.

=== Initial encounter with krishna III ===
The Rashtrakuta invasion culminated in the Battle of Takkolam in 949 CE, where the forces of Rashtrakuta king Krishna III defeated the Chola army led by Rajaditya, son of Parantaka I. According to the Atakur inscription, Rajaditya was killed in the battle by an arrow shot by Butuga, a Ganga chief allied with Krishna III. His death is also recorded in the Tiruvalangadu plates and the Larger Leiden Grant. The defeat weakened Chola control over its northern territories, although resistance continued for several years, as indicated by South Arcot inscriptions dated to 952–954 that acknowledge neither Chola nor Rashtrakuta supremacy.

Some historians note that the struggle between Parantaka I and the Rashtrakutas was not uniformly favourable to the latter. The Kanyakumari inscription of Virarajendra states that Parantaka I defeated Krishna III. Historian A. S. Altekar interprets this reference as possibly relating to an earlier engagement before 944 CE, suggesting that Parantaka I achieved a temporary success against Krishna III before the renewed Rashtrakuta invasion that culminated in the Battle of Takkolam (c. 949 CE). K. A. Nilakanta Sastri also questioned the early dating of the Siddhalingamadam inscription attributing the conquest of Kanchi and Tanjavur to Krishna III in 944–45, arguing that firm Rashtrakuta occupation of Tondaimandalam occurred only after the Battle of Takkolam.

== Civic and religious contributions ==
Although Parantaka I was engaged for the greater part of his long reign in warlike operations, the internal administration of his country was a matter in which he took a keen interest. He laid out the rules for the conduct of the village assemblies in an inscription. The village institutions of South India date from a much earlier period than that of Parantaka I, but he introduced many salutary reforms for the proper administration of local self-government.

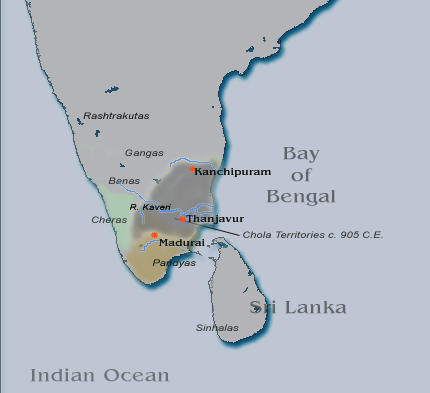
Chola Territories c. 905

The copper-plate inscriptions detail Parantaka I's promotion of agricultural prosperity by the digging of numerous canals all over the country.

He also utilised the spoils of war to donate to numerous temple charities. He is reported to have covered the Chidambaram Siva Temple with a golden roof. He was a devout Saiva (follower of Siva). According to the Thiruvilandur Copper Plate by T. S. Sridhar, Parantaka’s claim of gilding the Chidambaram temple may have involved restoring or enhancing an earlier golden roof. Appar (6th–7th century) and Tirumangai Alvar (mid-8th century) had already described the temple as having a golden structure. Parantaka may therefore have restored the existing golden vimana or added significant new elements to it.

== Personal life ==
Parantaka had many wives, of whom no fewer than eleven appear in the inscriptions. He was deeply religious yet secular, actively encouraging diverse faiths. Multiple members of his family built temples and regularly donated to various shrines across the kingdom. Kotanta Rama, identical to Rajaditya, was the eldest son of Parantaka I. There is an inscription of him from Tiruvorriyur making a donation for some lamps during the 30th year of his father. Besides Kotanta Rama, Parantaka had several other sons: Arikulakesari, Gandaraditya and Uttamasili.

Parantaka maintained a close alliance with the Chera rulers of Kerala, and this relationship was further strengthened through a dynastic marriage. He married a Chera princess, who later became the mother of his son, Rajaditya. A member of the retinue of pillaiyar (prince) Rajadittadeva gave a gift to the Vishnu temple at Tirunavalur/Tirumanallur in the 32nd year of Parantaka I. Tirunavalur was also known as "Rajadittapuram" after Rajaditya. A large number of warriors from the aristocratic families of the Chera kingdom formed part of the retinue of this Chola prince. In the 39th year of Parantaka I, his daughter-in-law, Mahadevadigal, a queen of Rajaditya and the daughter of Lataraja donated a lamp to the temple of Rajadityesvara for the merit of her brother. He had at least two daughters: Viramadevi and Anupama. Uttamasili does not appear to have lived long enough to succeed to the Chola throne.

He bore numerous epithets such as Viranarayana, Virakirti, Vira-Chola, Vikrama-Chola, Irumadi-Sola (Chola with two crowns alluding to the Chola and the Pandya kingdoms), Devendran (lord of the gods), Chakravartin (the emperor), Panditavatsalan (fond of learned men), Kunjaramallan (the wrestler with elephants) and Surachulamani (the crest jewel of the heroes).

Parantaka I died in 955. His second son Gandaraditya succeeded him.

== Inscriptions ==
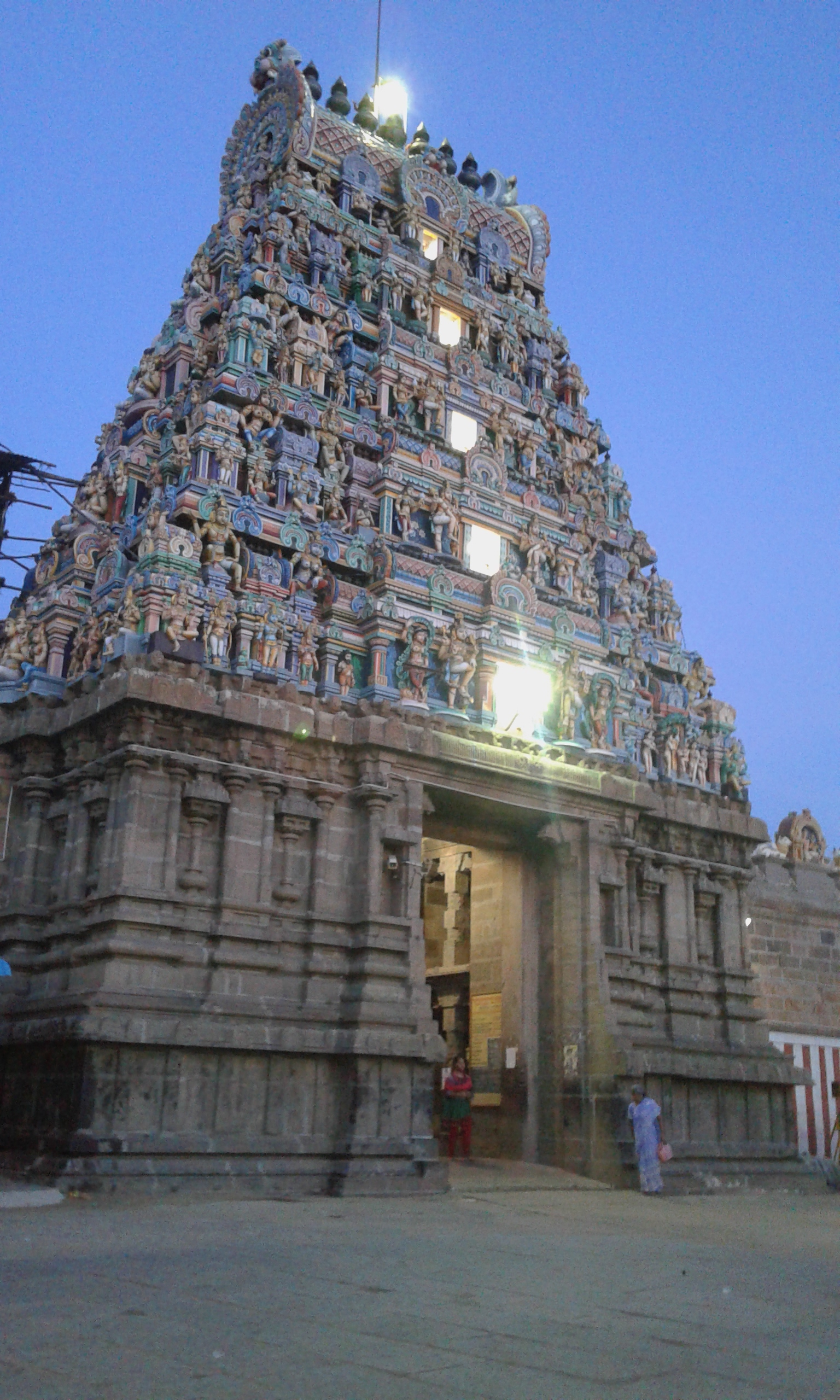
Thyagaraja Temple

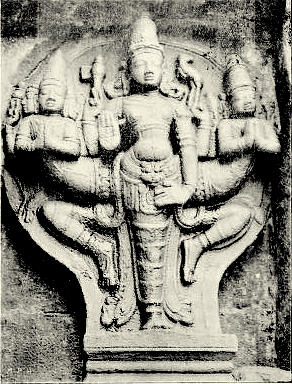
Sculpture in Tiruvottiyur.

The following is an inscription of Parantaka I from Tiruvorriyur. It is important as it shows that his dominions included regions beyond Thondaimandalam:

..record of the Chola king Maduraikonda Parakesarivarman(Parantaka) dated in his 34th year. Records gift of lamp to the temple of Tiruvorriyur Mahadeva by Maran Parameswaran alias Sembiyan Soliyavarayan of Sirukulattur in Poyyurkurram, a sub-division of Tenkarai-nadu. Refers to a military officer who destroyed Sitpuli and destroyed Nellore.

This is of his son Arinjaya making a donation. Once again it is from Tiruvorriyur:

On the eleventh slab. Records in the 30th year of Maduraikonda Parakesarivarman(Parantaka) dated in his 30th year, gift of gold for a lamp by Arindigai-perumanar, son of Chola-Perumanadigal (i.e Parantaka), to the god Siva at Adhigrama.

There are also several inscriptions of his son Rajaditya from Tirunavalur. One such inscription is the following from the temple of Rajadityesvara in Tirunavalur. The temple was also called Tiruttondîsvaram:

A record in the 29th year of the Chola king Maduraikonda Parakesarivarman. Records gift of 20 sheep for offerings and of two lamps to the shrines of Rajadityesvara and Agastyesvara by a servant of Rajadityadeva.

== Chola-Chera relations (c. 9th-10th centuries CE) ==
Cola-Cera Perumal relations (c. 9th-10th centuries CE)

Sister?	Sthanu Ravi Kulasekhara
Vijayaraga (Jayaraga?)	Ravi Nili alias Kilan Atikal
Ravi Nili alias Ko Kilan Atikal (fl. 935/36)	Parantaka I (fl. 907-955)	Paluvettaraiyar princess (Arumoli Nankaiyar?)
Rajaditya (fl. 948/49)	Arinjaya

== See also ==
- Battle of Takkolam

== Notes ==
Preceded by Aditya I	Chola; 907–955 CE	Succeeded by Gandaraditya
