= Rajaditya Chola =

Chola prince (died c. 949 CE)

- Yanaimel Tunjiya (he who died on the back of an elephant)
- Born: Pazhayarai, Chola Empire
- Died: 949 CE; Takkolam
- Dynasty: Chola
- Father: Parantaka I
- Mother: Ko Kilan Atikal
- Religion: Hinduism

Rajaditya Chola (fl. mid-10th century AD) was a Chola prince, son of king Parantaka I (r. 907–955) and a Chera princess (the Ko Kizhan Adigal), known for commanding the Chola troops in the battle of Takkolam (948–949).

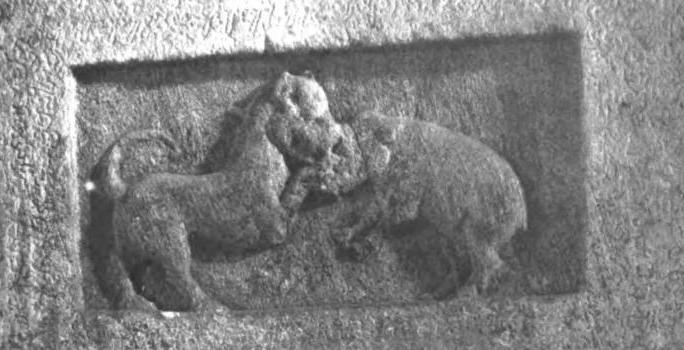
Sculptures in Atakur inscription (showing a hound and a boar fighting each other)

The death of prince Rajaditya in the battle is unusually commemorated by the Cholas. The Chola version of the events can be found in Larger Leiden Grant (1006 AD) of Rajaraja I and Tiruvalangadu Plates (1018 AD) of Rajendra Chola. An account of the battle, which differs in some details from the Chola version, is found in the Atakur inscription issued by Krishna III and prince Butuga II (a young underlord of Krishna III) of the Western Ganga family. The Shravanabelagola record of Ganga king Marasimha (963 - 975 AD) also claims victory of the Chera king for his predecessor Bhutuga II. Indirect references to the battle can also be found in the inscriptions of Vellan Kumaran, a Chera commander in the Chola army.

== Early life ==
Rajaditya was the son of the Ko Kizhan Adikal, the Chera princess, and the Chola king Parantaka I (r. 907–955 AD). The marriage between a Chera princess and Parantaka, c. 910 CE, is mentioned in the Udayendiram plates of Ganga king Prthivipati II Hastimalla.

It seems that Chola king Parantaka I anticipated a climactic battle with the Rashtrakutas and their allies in Tirumunaippati Nadu. Sometime in the 930s, or perhaps as early as 923 AD, prince Rajaditya was sent with a substantial military contingent, including elephants and horses, as well as his entire household, to Rajadityapura (Tirunavalur/Tirumanallur) in Tirumunaippati Nadu (to protect the northern edges of a nascent Chola state). The prince was joined at Rajadityapura by his mother (the Chera princess Ko Kizhan Adikal) in the mid-930s and his half-brother Arinjaya. Rajaditya was supported by a number of military personnel from Kerala (Chera) chiefdoms in Tirumunaippati Nadu.

== Veeranam Lake ==
Veeranam Lake was built by the Cholas during the reign of Rajaditya Chola between 907 and 953 AD.

== Battle of Takkolam ==
Battle of Takkolam, Takkolam is a town in Arakkonam taluk of the Vellore district, northern Tamil Nadu.

The Rashtrakuta contingent at Takkolam included a collection of feudal militias and royal soldiers (from North Western Gangas, Banas, Pandiyas and Vaidumbas among others). Prince Rajaditya, in addition to the Chola warriors, was supported by a number of military personnel and warriors from Kerala (Chera) chiefdoms , commanders and soldiers decending from Pallivaal Por Padai of Old Palava territory and 701 warlords and their warriors of Perarasu Chola(Parantaka Chola) Ezhunootri oru Kongavalar Perum Padai from Chola influenced Southern Western Gangas (Kongu) .

At Takkolam in the North Arcot district, a major battle was fought. According to Rashtrakuta Inscriptions The Cholas fought bravely; Rashtrakuta inscriptions acknowledge that the Chola forces initially advanced with little resistance and that none dared to counter-attack. However, Manalera and Buduga are said to have succeeded in killing Prince Rajaditya's elephant.Chola records mentioned Prince Rajaditya fought courageously and earned the title 'Yanaimel Tunjiya'(he who died on the back of an elephant).

The Battle of Takkolam, fought in 948–949 CE, resulted in the death of Rajaditya on the battlefield and the defeat of the Chola garrison at Takkolam. According to the Atakur inscription, during the battle, Rajaditya was struck while seated atop his war elephant by an arrow from prince Butuga II. The Chola prince died instantly. The Chola army was subsequently defeated and retreated in disorder. The collapse of the Chola resistance after the battle of Takkolam lead to the virtual destruction of the Chola empire.

Here is an excerpt from Atakur inscription :

Hail! While the samvatsara named Saumya, the eight hundred and seventy second [in] the centuries of years that have gone by from the time of the Saka king, was current:-

Hail! When Krishnaraja [III]... having attacked the Muvadi Chola Rajaditya, and having fought and killed him in Takkola...

At the place where,-having followed and come up with Four-fold Forces of the Chola, which stood to confront us without wavering,-we were to come close quarters and pierce them, we certainly saw not any [others among our] valiant men who strode forward saying "We will meet the heros that oppose us; "but we did see how,-the Chola himself being the witness, -he [Manalera] came to close quarters and pierced...he [Manalera], the sole Sudraka in war...struck, like a lion, the forehead of the [Rajaditya's] elephant...

The subsidiary record engraved on the upper part of slab throws some more light on the incident:

Hail! While Butuga [II], having fought and killed Rachamalla, the son of the illustrious Ereyapa, was governing the [pronvince of] ninety six thousand:-

At the time when Kannaradeva was fighting against the Chola, Butuga [II] while embracing Rajaditya, treacherously stabbed him with a dagger, and thus fought and killed him....

== Battle of Takkolam and Death ==
"The heroic Rajaditya, the ornament of the solar race, having shaken in battle the unshakable Krishnaraja with his forces, by means of his sharp arrows flying in all directions, was himself pierced in his heart while seated on the back of a large elephant by the sharp arrows of the enemy, and (thus) winning the praise of the three worlds, he ascended to the heaven of heroes in a tall vimana"

— Thiruvalangadu Inscriptions

== Chola-Chera relations (c. 9th-10th centuries AD) ==
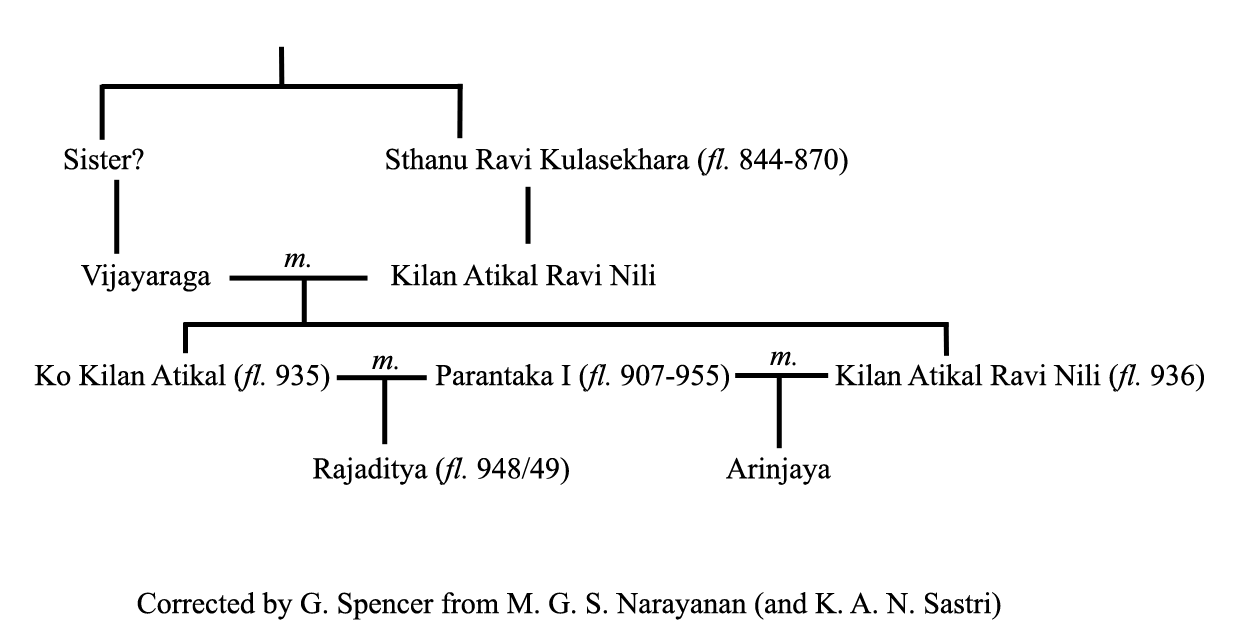

== Ecphory ==
- On 24 Feb 2025, in the honor of Rajaditya chola's greatness, the central government officially announced the name of the CISF Regional Training Centre (RTC) operating in Thakkolam as "Raja Aditya Cholan Regional Training Centre".
- The Central Industrial Security Force (CISF) celebrated its 56th Raising Day on 7 March 2025 in Takkolam, Tamil Nadu, where Home Minister Amit Shah officially announced the name of the training center complex as "Raja Aditya Chola Training Center".

== See also ==
- Veeranam Lake
