= Aditya I =

Chola emperor from 871 to 907

- Kodandarama; Rajakesari Varman, Tondaimanarrur Tunjina Udaiyar
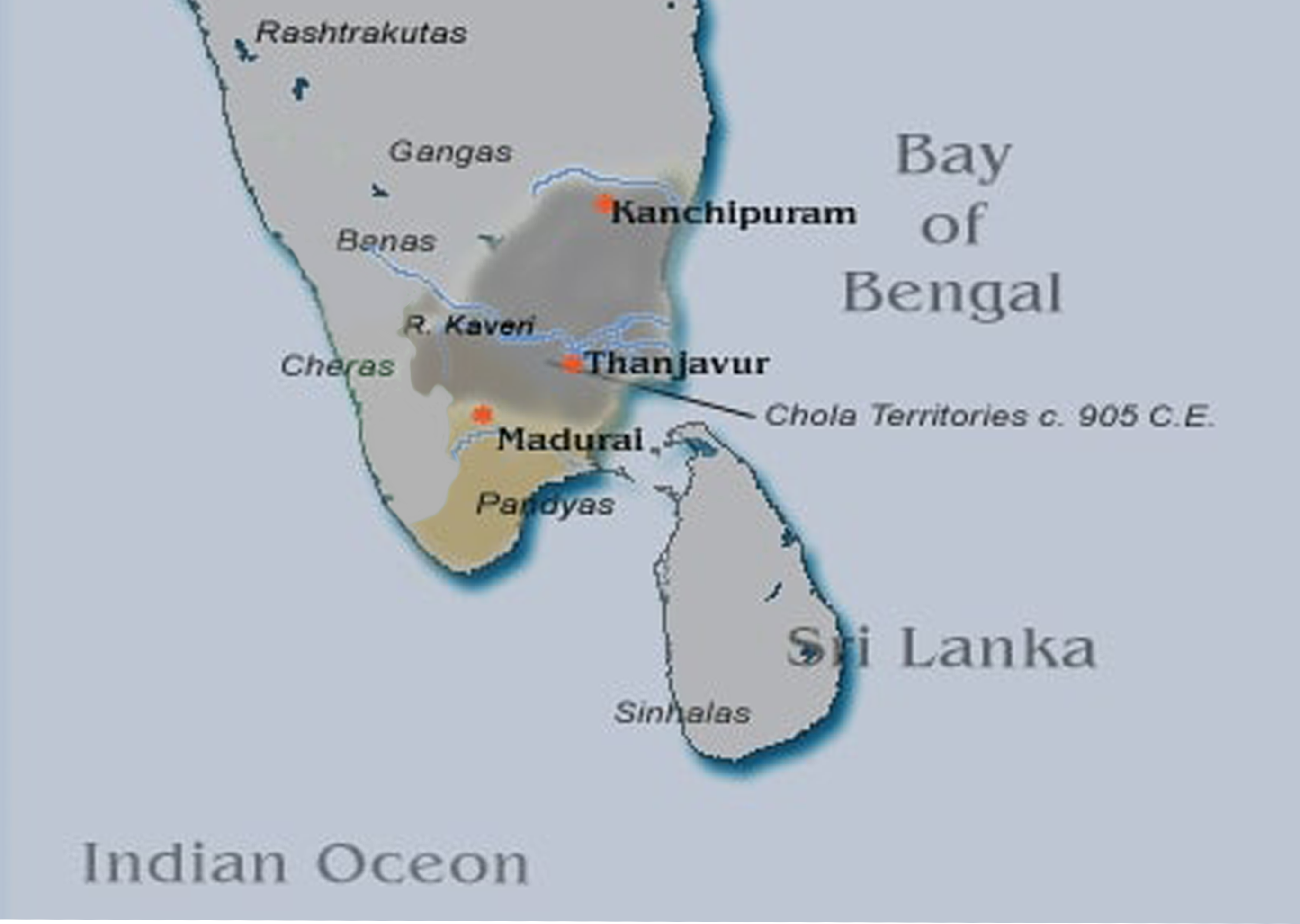
- Chola territories c. 905 CE

Chola Emperor
- Reign: c. 871 – c. 907
- Predecessor: Vijayalaya Chola
- Successor: Parantaka I
- Born: Pazhayarai, Pallava Empire (present-day Tamil Nadu, India)
- Died: 907; Tondaimanarrur, Chola Kingdom (present-day Andhra Pradesh, India)
- Queens: Tribhuvanamadeviyar; Ilangon Pichchi
- Issue: Parantaka Chola I Kannara Devan
- Dynasty: Chola
- Father: Vijayalaya Chola
- Mother: Anaghavati
- Religion: Hinduism

Aditya Chola I was a Chola king who reigned in the late ninth to early tenth century CE. He was the son of Vijayalaya Chola, and laid the foundation of the Medieval Cholas with the conquest of the Pallava Kingdom and the occupation of the Western Ganga Kingdom and Kongu Nadu. Aditya Chola I was succeeded by his eldest son Parantaka Chola I.

== Battle of Thirupurambiyam ==
In 878 CE, Pandyan king Varagunavarman II invaded the Chola country, which was under the influence of the Pallavas. In the battle held at Thirupurambiyam, he was opposed by Aparajita Varman, the son of Nriputungavarman, and was joined by Aditya Chola and Western Ganga king Prithvipati I. The Pandyas were defeated although Prithvipati was killed in the battle. The Cholas gained certain territories from the Pallavas for the help in the battle.

== Conquest of Tondaimandalam and Kongu Nadu ==
Aditya Chola I planned to overthrow the Pallavas, and invaded Tondai Nadu in 897 CE. He killed king Aparajita in the battle, and the Pallava kingdom became part of Chola territory. The Western Ganga king Prithvipati II acknowledged the suzerainty of Aditya Chola. He conquered the Kongu Nadu region, which was under the suzerainty of the Pandya king Parantaka Viranarayanan. The campaign was possibly supported by the Chera ruler Sthanu Ravi. Tamil inscription from the period indicate that Aditya repaired the highway Rajakesari Peruvazhi, which connected the Chera Nadu with Kongu Nadu.

== Death and Succession ==
Aditya I is mentioned as Toṇṭaimāṉarūr Tuñciṉa Uṭaiyār meaning "the King who died at Tondaimanarur". He died in 907 CE at Tondaimanarrur. His son Parantaka I built a Shiva temple at the place. He was survived by his consorts Ilangon Pichchi and Vayiri Akkan alias Tribhuvana Madeviyar, and a mistress Nangai Sattaperumanar as evidenced from an inscription.

| Preceded by Vijayalaya Chola | Chola; 871–907 CE | Succeeded by Parantaka Chola I |
