= Ko Kizhan Adikal =

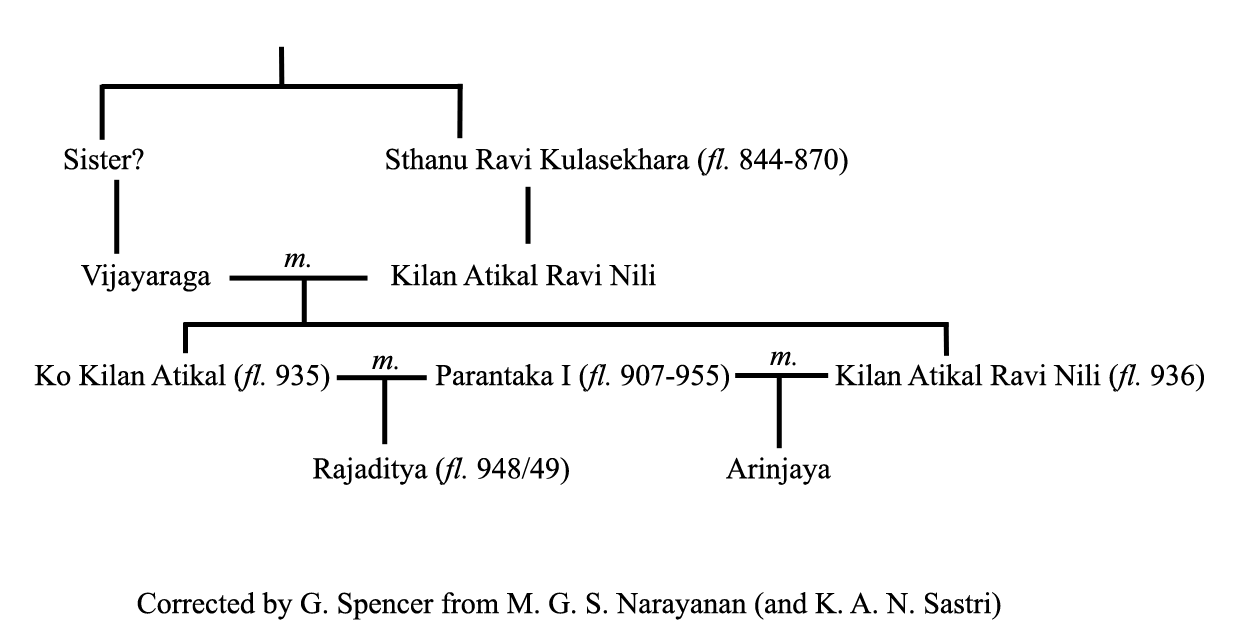
Chola-medieval Chera relations (c. 9th-10th centuries AD)

Ko Kizhan Adikal Ravi Neeli was a traditional title used by queens and princesses of the medieval Chera kingdom (c. 9th — early 12th century CE) in south India. It was initially believed that "Kizhan Adikal" was a proper given name rather than a royal title.

The title continued to be used by Kerala princesses (in the Tamil country) even after their marriages to Chola princes.

== Records ==
The title appears several inscriptions discovered in Kerala and Tamil Nadu.

=== Records associated with the Cholas ===
1. "Ko Kizhan Adikal", mother of the Chola prince Rajaditya, is mentioned in a Tirunavalur/Tirumanallur inscription (c. 935 AD, 28th regnal year) of the Chola king Parantaka I (907 — 955 AD) (EI VII, 19a).
2. The Lalgudi record of Cankaran Kunrappozhan, from Puttur in Malainatu (Kerala), refers to "Cheramanar makalar" "Ko Kizhan Adikal" (queen of Parantaka) (SII 19, no. 408) (identified with the mother of prince Rajaditya).
3. "Ravi Neeli" or "Kizhan Adikal ", daughter of "Cheramanar" or "Keralaraja" Vijayaraga, is mentioned in a Tiruvotriyur inscription (936 AD, 29th regnal year) of king Parantaka I (Index 17 & SII III, 103).
4. "Kizhan Adikal" appears alongside her husband, king Parantaka I, in the Tiruvalla copper plates (lines 109-111) (Index A80 & TAS II, III).

The Anbil copperplates of Sundara Chola (EI 15, no. 5) suggest that Parantaka I married the daughter of the Lord of Kerala, known as Pazhuvettaraiyar, and that Arinjaya Chola was born to them. This has led historians to suggest that Parantaka I may have married two princesses from Kerala: one, the unnamed daughter of the Pazhuvettaraiyar (the Lord of Kerala) and the mother of Arinjaya Chola; and the other, the daughter of the Chera king of Kerala, the "Ko Kizhan Adikal" (SII 19, no. 408; the mother of Rajaditya). The unnamed Pazhuvettaraiyar princess is sometimes identified with Arumozhi Nankaiyar, the daughter of the Pazhuvettaraiyar and queen of Parantaka I, who is mentioned in a Tiruchennampunti record (18th regnal year).

It has also been suggested that the princesses mentioned in cases (1; EI VII, 19a) and (3; SII III, 103) were either the same person or sisters. If they were sisters, this would suggest that king Parantaka I married two different Chera princesses from Kerala, who were the mothers of his two sons, Rajaditya and Arinjaya Chola.

The marriage between a Chera or Kerala princess and Parantaka is recorded in the Udayendiram plates of the Ganga ruler Prthivipati II Hastimalla (SII 2, no. 76).

The velam (a Chola palace establishment of women) of the Kizhan Adikal ("Kizhan Adikal Velam" or "Kizhai Velam") at Tanjavur is mentioned in three Chola inscriptions.

1. Saranganatha Perumal Temple, Tiruchirai, Kumbakonam (5th regnal year) (SII 19, 150).
2. Vedaranyeswara Temple, Vedaranyam, Tirutturaippundi, Tanjore (Parantaka I, 43rd regnal year) (SII 17, 530).
3. Nageswaraswamin Temple, Kumbakonam (Aditya II Karikala, 4th regnal year, the mother of Rajaditya) — as "Udaya Pirattiyar Kizhan Adikal" (SII 3, 201).

=== Other medieval Chera records ===
1. "Ravi Neeli alias Kizhan Adikal", daughter of Kulasekhara and wife of Vijayaraga, in a Tirunandikkara inscription (9th century AD) (Index A7 & TAS IV, 36).
2. "Chatira Sikhamani alias Kizhan Adikal" or "Perumattiyar" appears in a Trikkakara inscription (953 AD) associated with Chera king Indu Goda (10th century AD) (Index A24 & TAS III, 36).
3. "Kizhan Adikal" is mentioned in a Tiruvanchuli/Tiruvalanjuli temple (Tanjore) inscription referring to medieval Chera ruler Rama Kulasekhara (fl. late 11th century AD) (SII III, 221).
