= Thakkolam =

- Town
- Location in Tamil Nadu, India Thakkolam (India)
- Coordinates: 13°01′00″N 79°43′53″E
- Country: India
- State: Tamil Nadu
- District: Ranipet district
- Region: Vellore
- Suburban: Chennai Metropolitan Area

Area
  - Total: 8.5 km^{2} (3.3 sq mi)

Population (2011)
  - Total: 13,983
  - Density: 1,600/km^{2} (4,300/sq mi)
- Postal code: 631 151

Thakkolam is a panchayat town in Ranipet district, Chennai Metropolitan Area region of Tamil Nadu, India. In Thakkolam there is a famous Siva temple, named Jalantheeswarar Temple, the main lord is Jalanadheeshwaran. It is one among 276 Paadal Petra Sthalam. The temple is the scene for the Battle of Takkolam.

== Demographics ==
As of 2001 India census, Thakkolam had a population of 11,919. Males constitute 54% of the population and females 46%. Thakkolam has an average literacy rate of 70%, higher than the national average of 59.5%: male literacy is 80%, and female literacy is 58%. In Thakkolam, 10% of the population is under 6 years of age.

== Transportation ==
With the development of a vast road network, Thakkolam is well connected to its nearby towns and villages. The Thakkolam railway station connects the village to Arakonam, Tirumalpur, Kanchipuram and Chengalpet and the Thiruvalangadu railway station connects to Chennai and Arakonam.The place has got a very famous god called Lord Dhakshinamoorthy in "Thava kolam" since ever called thakolam. Lord Dhakahinamoorthy is worshipped in Jalanadheeshwarar temple.

== Prominent Peoples ==
- S. J. Ramaswamy Mudali ex MLA of Arakkonam and Solinghur constituency.
