= Battle of Takkolam =

Battle in South India

- Part of Krishna's Southern Expedition
| Date | 948–949 |
| Location | Takkolam, Ranipet district, Tamil Nadu |
| Result | Rashtrakuta victory |
| Territorial changes | Takkolam and Surrounding areas annexed by Rashtrakutas |

Belligerents
| Chola Empire; Cheras | Rashtrakuta Empire; Western Ganga Dynasty |

Commanders and leaders
| Rajaditya Chola †; Vellan Kumaran (Chera/Kerala) | Krishna III; Vaddiga I Butuga II |

The Battle of Takkolam (948–949) was a military engagement between a contingent of troops led by Rajaditya, crown prince and eldest son of the Chola king Parantaka I (907–955), and another led by the Rashtrakuta king Krishna III (939–967) at Takkolam in southern India. The battle resulted in the death of Rajaditya on the battlefield and the defeat of the Chola garrison at Takkolam.

The battle is considered as the climax of the confrontation between the two imperials powers, the Rashtrakutas and the Cholas, for complete domination of south India. The death of prince Rajaditya is unusually commemorated by the Cholas. The Chola version of the events can be found in Larger Leiden Grant (1006 AD) of Rajaraja I and Tiruvalangadu Plates (1018 AD) of Rajendra Chola. An account of the battle, which differs in some details from the Chola version, is found in the Atakur inscription issued by Krishna III and prince Butuga II (a young underlord of Krishna III) of the Western Ganga family. The Shravanabelgola record of Ganga king Marasimha (963–975 AD) also claims victory of the king for his predecessor Bhutuga II.

== Background ==
It seems that king Parantaka I anticipated a climactic battle with the Rashtrakutas and their allies in Tirumunaippati Nadu.

Sometime in the 930s, or perhaps as early as 923 AD, prince Rajaditya was sent with a substantial military contingent, including elephants and horses, as well as his entire household, to the region (to protect the northern edges of a nascent Chola state). The prince was joined in Tirumunaippati Nadu by his mother and his half-brother Arinjaya.

== Battle at Takkolam ==
The Rashtrakuta contingent at Takkolam included a collection of feudal militias and royal soldiers (from Western Gangas, Banas and Vaidumbas among others). Prince Rajaditya was supported by a number of military personnel from Kerala (Chera) chiefdoms.

At Takkolam in the North Arcot district, a major battle was fought. The Cholas fought bravely; Rashtrakuta inscriptions acknowledge that the Chola forces initially advanced with little resistance and that none dared to counter-attack. However, Manalera and Buduga are said to have succeeded in killing Prince Rajaditya's elephant.Chola records mentioned Prince Rajaditya fought courageously in the battle and earned the title 'Yanaimel Tunjiya'(he who died on the back of an elephant).

An account of the battle, which differs in some details from the Chola version, is found in the Atakur inscription issued by Krishna III and prince Butuga (a young underlord of Krishna III) of the Western Ganga family. According to the inscription, during the battle, Rajaditya was struck while seated atop his war elephant by an arrow from prince Butuga. The Chola prince died instantly. The Chola army was subsequently defeated and retreated in disorder.

== Consequences ==
The collapse of the Chola resistance after the battle of Takkolam lead to the virtual destruction of the Chola Empire. The Rashtrakutas conquered eastern and northern parts of the Chola Empire and advanced to Rameswaram. As per the Karhad copper plates of Krishna II, dated 959 AD, the king "uprooted the Cholas, distributed their territory among his followers, and extracted tribute from the Chera (Kerala) and Pandya kings" during his campaign.

The epithet ‘Tanjaiyunkonda’ or the 'conqueror of Tanjore' was given to Krishna III as mentioned in many records found in Tondai-Mandalam, that the conclusion becomes inevitable that he had conquered and occupied the Chola capital at least for some time. The statements in the Karhad plates states that Krishna defeated the Pandyas and the Keralas, exacted tributes from the king of Ceylon and planted the creeper of his fame at Ramesvara

As per historians, the defeat at Takkolam reversed the substantial political gains made by Parantaka Chola in previous decades. It opened the way for a period of multiple (and perhaps even disputed) Chola accessions. The Chola royals remained in confusion, and perhaps continued a precarious political existence under the threat of Rashtrakuta invasion.

== See also ==
- Krishna III
- Parantaka I

== Bibliography ==
- A. S. Altekar (1934). Rashtrakutas And Their Times. Digital Library of India.
