= Sthanu Ravi Kulasekhara =

Sthanu Ravi
- Kulasekhara

Chera Perumal
- Reign: 844/45 – 870/71 AD
- Predecessor: N/A
- Successor: Rama Rajasekhara
- Issue: Kizhan Atikal Ravi Neeli
Regnal name
- Kulasekhara
- House: Cheras (medieval Kerala)
- Religion: Hinduism

Sthanu Ravi (Old Malayalam and Tamil: Ko Tanu Iravi), known as the Kulasekhara, was the Chera Perumal ruler of Kerala in southern India from 844/45 to c. 870/71 AD. He is the earliest medieval Chera ruler of Kerala known to scholars. Sthanu Ravi notably assisted the Chola ruler Aditya I (c. 871–907 AD) in conquering the Kongu country from the Pandyas around 885 AD.

The famous Quilon Syrian Christian copper plates are dated to the fifth regnal year of king Sthanu Ravi. Two more inscriptions dated in the regnal years of Sthanu Ravi are found at the Irinjalakuda Kudalmanikyam Temple and at Thiruvatruvay, Thiruvalla. The Koyil Adhikarikal ("Royal Prince") during his time was his son-in-law (husband of his daughter), Vijayaraga. Sthanu Ravi had a son born around 870 AD. He was succeeded by Rama Rajasekhara (c. 870/71–c. 883/84).

Toward the end of his reign, Sthanu Ravi probably abdicated the throne and became a Vaishnavite alvar saint known as Kulasekhara Alvar (the seventh of the twelve mystic alvars). He is also identified with the playwright Chera king "Kulasekhara Varma".

== Background ==
In the mid-9th century south India, the Chera rulers of Kerala possessed a lineage name tied to the high prestige of Tamil classical poetry (the Sangam Literature). Sthanu Ravi Kulasekhara is regarded as the earliest known Chera ruler (the Perumal) of Kerala. It is speculated that present-day central Kerala likely separated from the larger Chera or Kerala kingdom around the 8th–9th century AD to form the Chera kingdom of Mahodayapuram-Kodungallur. According to the Keralolpathi tradition, central Kerala was probably under some form of viceregal rule before this period.

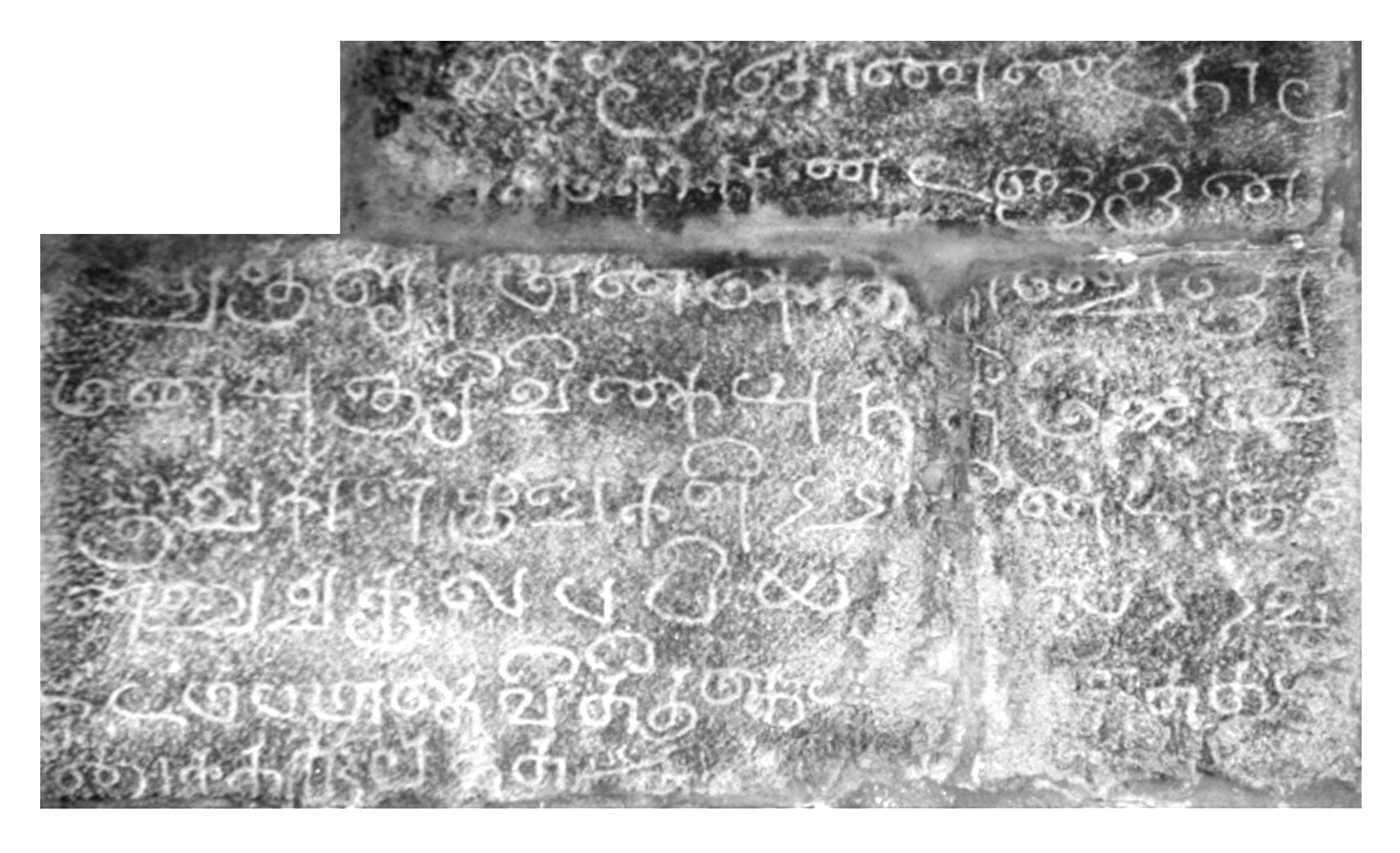
Remains of the Thillaisthanam inscription (9th century AD, Aditya Chola)

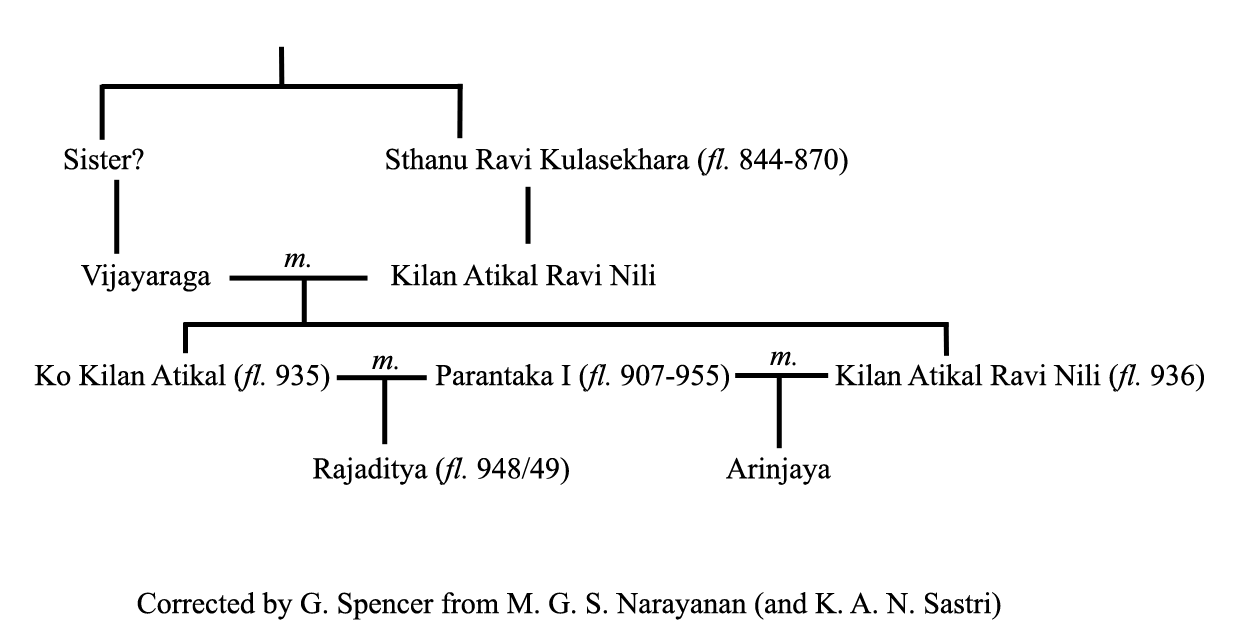
Chola-Chera Perumal relations (c. 9th-10th centuries AD)

== Campaigns in the Kongu country ==
Sthanu Ravi appears to have acted as a junior ally in a military campaign led by the Chola ruler bearing the title "Rajakesari Varma" in the Kongu country (central Tamil Nadu). Epigraphic evidence indicates that the two rulers jointly conferred military honours upon a Tanjore chief named Vikki Annan, who was married to a woman identified as "Kadamba Mahadevi". Vikki Annan was likely a Ganga prince, being the son of Prithvipati, and is mentioned in a Ganga inscription dated to the mid-9th century AD. However, records also indicate that "Vikki Annan" was a title adopted by the Chalukyas. The designation "Kadamba" in the princess's name suggests a probable affiliation with the Kadamba lineage.

The identity of the Chola ruler titled "Rajakesari Varma" remains a subject of scholarly debate. One interpretation, advanced by historian Elamkulam P. N. Kunjan Pillai and others, identifies "Rajakesari Varma" with Aditya Chola (c. 871–907 AD). This hypothesis assumes that Sthanu Ravi ruled Kerala until around 885 AD, enabling his participation as a junior partner in Aditya Chola’s Kongu campaigns, particularly the conquest of the region from the Pandyas (c. 885 AD). Recent scholarship generally supports this view. An alternative interpretation, accepted by M. G. S. Narayanan (1972/1996) following T. V. Mahalingam ("An Interregnum in Pallava History", JIH, XLI, I), identifies "Rajakesari Varma" with Srikantha Chola (817–845 AD), thereby placing the joint military action in Kongu around 844/45 AD.

== Astronomy ==
The astronomer and mathematician Sankaranarayana (c. 840–900 AD) served as a distinguished member of the royal court of Kulasekhara at the capital, Mahodayapuram (present-day Kodungallur). He is best known for authoring the Laghubhaskariyavyakha, an extensive commentary on the works of the eminent mathematician Bhaskara I (7th century AD). Evidence suggests that an "astronomical observatory" operated at Mahodayapuram under Sankaranarayana's supervision.

The vyakhya contains references to an instrument termed the "Rashichakra", marked by a "Yanthravalaya". This "device" is possibly identical to the Golayanthra or Chakrayanthra described by the renowned polymath Aryabhata. The Chakrayanthra was subsequently refined and came to be known as the Phalakayanthra by Bhaskara I.

== Inscriptions ==
=== As Sthanu Ravi ===
Ayyan Adikal, the chieftain of the port of Quilon (present-day Kollam) under Sthanu Ravi, issued the renowned Quilon Syrian Christian copper plates around 849 AD. The inscription records that Ayyan Adikal granted land and serfs to a Christian church at Quilon, established by Mar Sapir Iso, and entrusted its maintenance to the trade guilds anjuvannam and manigramam. The grant was made in the presence of the Chera Perumal prince Vijayaraga. An inscription from Kanyakumari indicates that Vijayaraga was married to a daughter of Kulasekhara, titled Kizhan Adikal Ravi Neeli, and was likely the son of Kulasekhara's sister.

Year	Inscription	Nature (language)	Royal Name	Notes
849 AD	Quilon Syrian Christian copper plates	Royal charter (Malayalam)	"Tanu Ravi"; "Koyil Adhikarikal Vijayaraga Deva"	The oldest Chera Perumal inscription from Kerala.; Dated in the 5th regnal year (849/50) of king Tanu Ravi.; Ayyan Adigal, the chieftain of Venad, grant land and serfs to the Christian church of Tarsa, Quilon.; Koyil Adhikarikal (the Royal Prince) Vijayaraga is present when Ayyan Adigal gives privileges to Christian merchant Mar Sapir Iso.
855 AD	Irinjalakkuda inscription (Kudalmanikyam Temple) - a single granite slab currently fixed on the bottom portion of the inside wall of the first prakara of the temple.	Temple committee resolution (Malayalam)	"Tanu Ravi, Ko"	Dated in the 11th regnal year (855/56) of king Tanu Ravi.; A council of the "Irungadikkudal" Parathaiyar (the Temple Committee) and Ilayavar.; The council unanimously decide to lease out land for some purpose.
861 AD	Thiruvatruvay copper plate - owned by Muvidathu Mecheri Illam (Thiruvalla)	Temple committee resolution (Malayalam)	"Tanu Ravi, Ko"	Dated in the 17th regnal year (861/62) of king Tanu Ravi.; Earliest reference to Onam Festival in Kerala.; A council of the Thiruvatruvay Sabha (the Temple Assembly) and Adikalmar (the Respected People).; The council unanimously wrap up Avani Onam feast arrangements with the land donated by certain Punchappatakarathu Chenthan Sankaran.
Inscription of Aditya Chola
c. 885 AD (?)	Thillaisthanam inscription (Tanjore) - a single granite slab on the south wall of the central shrine in the Ghrithasthaneshwara Temple, Thillaisthanam.	Temple inscription (Tamil)	"Cheraman Tanu Ravi, Ko"	Hail Prosperity! The wife of Vikki Annan, who was honoured by the king Kandan Rajakesari Varma who was the possessor of several elephants ["tondai-nadu-pavina-cholan-pal-yanai-ko-kandan"] and by the Cheraman Ko Tanu Iravi, with [the privilege of using] the seat [of honour], the chauris, the palanquin, the drum, a palace, [royal] dinner, [participation in it perhaps] and the bugle and [who was presented] with a battalion of elephants and the hereditary title of Sembiyan Tamilavel - Kadamba Mahadevi gave to the god Mahadeva at Tiruneyyttanam a perpetual lamp, for which the number of sheep given by her is a hundred. My these [charities] be under the protection of the several mahesvaras. — Travancore Archaeological Series (Volume II)

=== As Kulasekhara ===
9th century AD	Thirunanthikarai inscription - a single slab of granite in the courtyard of the structural temple	Temple committee resolution (Tamil)	"Kulasekhara Deva"; "Vijayaraga Deva"	A donation by Chera/Perumal princess Ravi Neeli Kizhan Adigal to Thirunanthikkarai Temple.; Thirunathikkarai Perumakkal (the Village Elders), the Thaliyalvan, and the Kanakar (members of the temple trust) meeting to receive 10 kalanju of gold from (princess) Ravi Neeli Kizhan Adigal for the Permanent Lamp (the nanda-vilakku) in the Thirunathikkarai temple.; Princess Ravi Neeli Kizhan Adigal is described as the daughter of king Kulasekhara Deva and wife of Vijayaraga Deva.

== Literary references ==
=== Contradicting testimonials ===
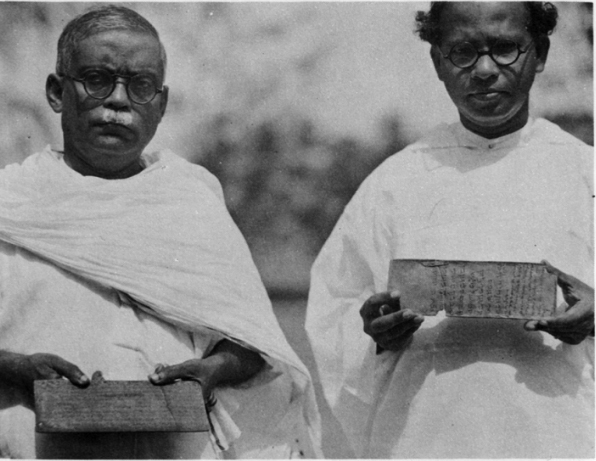
Quilon Syrian Plates

- An anonymous work titled "Padmapadacharyacharita" states that the protagonist — who was a disciple of philosopher-theologian Shankara — flourished during the time of a Kerala king named "Kulasekhara". However, "Shivanandalahari", attributed to Shankara, indirectly refers to the Kerala ruler as Rajasekhara. Similarly, "Shankaravijaya" by Vidyaranya also mentions a Kerala king named Rajasekhara as a contemporary of Shankara.
- Vasubhatta, a renowned Yamaka poet of medieval Kerala and the author of "Tripuradahana" and "Saurikathodaya", identifies his patron king as "Rama". "Vijayadarsika", a later commentary by Acyuta on Vasubhatta's "Yudhisthiravijaya", states that "Kulasekhara" was the coronation title of king Rama, whose given name, according to the commentator, was "Rama" ("Kulasekhara ityabhisekakrtam nama; pitradikrtam theramavarmeti"). "Ratnapradipika" by Sivadasa — another commentary subsequent to "Vijayadarsika" — echoes the same claim: "Kulasekharasya Kulasekhara iti namavatah, etadabhisekakrtam nama. Pitradikriam tu ramavarmeti". Modern scholars, however, generally regard these assertions as the result of confusion on the part of the commentators Acyuta and Sivadasa, who were chronologically distant from Vasubhatta, leading them to conflate Sthanu Ravi Kulasekhara with Rama Rajasekhara.
- Some scholars also identify king Rama Kulasekhara as the patron of the poet Vasubhatta, thereby placing Vasubhatta in the 11th–12th centuries AD. However, this view is generally considered unacceptable for several reasons.

== Laghubhaskariyavyakha ==
=== Identification of Sthanu Ravi with Kulasekhara ===
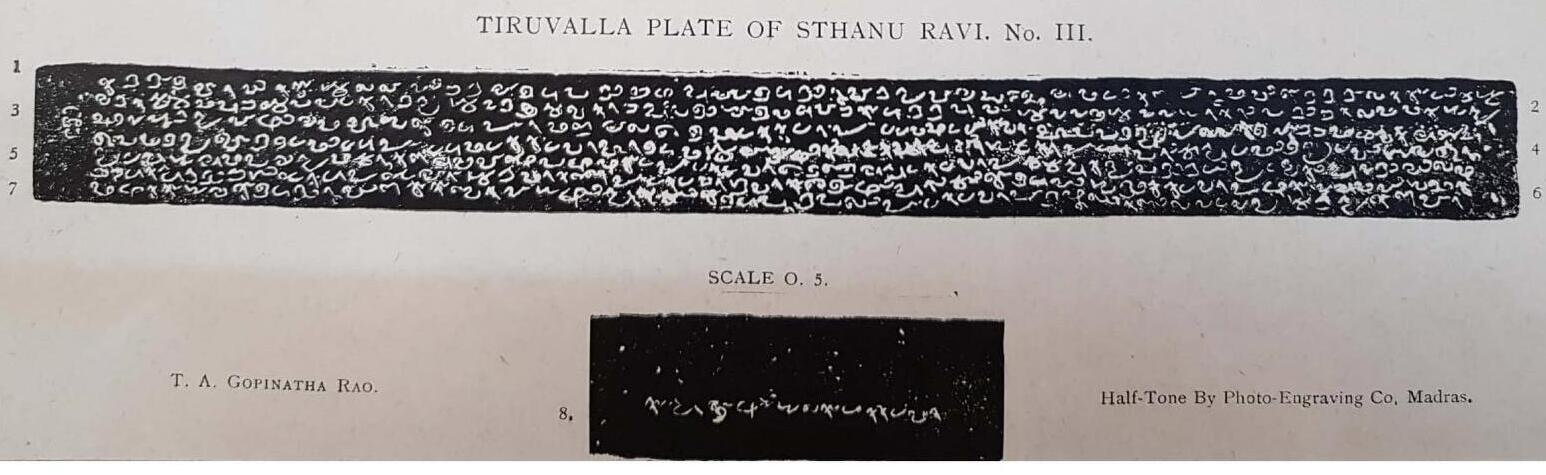
Tiruvarruvay inscription, Tiruvalla

"Sa sthanurjayati trirupasahito lingepi lokarcitah."

— Chapter I, Laghubhaskariyavyakha

In his commentary Laghubhaskariyavyakha, Sankaranarayana notes that he was patronized by a king of Mahodayapuram named "Ravi", who bore the title "Kulasekhara", thereby supporting the identification of Sthanu Ravi with Kulasekhara. The opening verse of the commentary also contains an indirect invocation to a lord referred to as "Sthanu", deliberately composed so as to be applicable both to the deity Shiva and to the reigning monarch.

=== Coronation year of Sthanu Ravi ===
Laghubhaskariyavyakha also provides two distinct dates, one in the Kali Era (866 AD, the date of an eclipse) and the other in the Saka Era (870 AD).

"Angartvambara nanda devamanubhir yate dinanam gane
Graste tigma mayukhamalinitamobhute parahne divi
Prsta praggrahanad dvitiyaghatika grasa pramanam raver
Bharta sri Kulasekharena vilasad velavrtaya bhuva."

— Chapter IV, Laghubhaskariyavyakha
- "Angartvambara nanda devamanubhir yate dinanam gane"
- Decipherment
  - Anga = 6, Rtu = 6, Ambara = 0, Nanda = 9, Veda = 4, and Manu = 14
  - Order - 6609414
  - Read in Reverse Order - 1449066
- Equivalent Kali Date - 3967 years and 86 days [= 25 Mithuna, Kollam Era 41] = 866 AD

"Evam Sakabdah punariha candra randhramuni sankhyaya asambhiravagatah."

— Chapter I, Laghubhaskariyavyakha
- Another reference to the date - "Sakabdah punariha candra randhramuni sankhyaya"
  - Candra = 1, Randhra = 9, and Muni = 7
  - Order - 197
  - Read in Reverse Order - 791 (Saka Year) = 870 AD

According to its own testimony, the Laghubhaskariyavivarana was composed in the 25th regnal year of Ravi Kulasekhara (869/70 AD), placing his coronation around 844/45 AD.

"Capapravista guru sauri samatva kalam
Yamyottaram gamanamantaratah pramanam
Acaksvya sarvamavagamya bhatoktamargad
Ityuktavan ravirasena nrpabhivandya."

"Tada pancavimsati Varsanyatitani devasya."

— Chapter VII, Laghubhaskariyavyakha

Further, Sankaranarayana mentions the conjunction of Guru (Jupiter) and Sauri (Saturn) in Capa (Dhanu), stating that it occurred when the king had completed 25 regnal years (Chapter VII). It is known that, in the 9th century AD, Jupiter and Saturn simultaneously entered Dhanu Rasi only in 869 AD.

== See also ==
- Rajendra Chola
- Raja Raja Chola
- Kulasekhara Alvar
