= Butuga II =

Western Ganga King from 938 to 961 CE

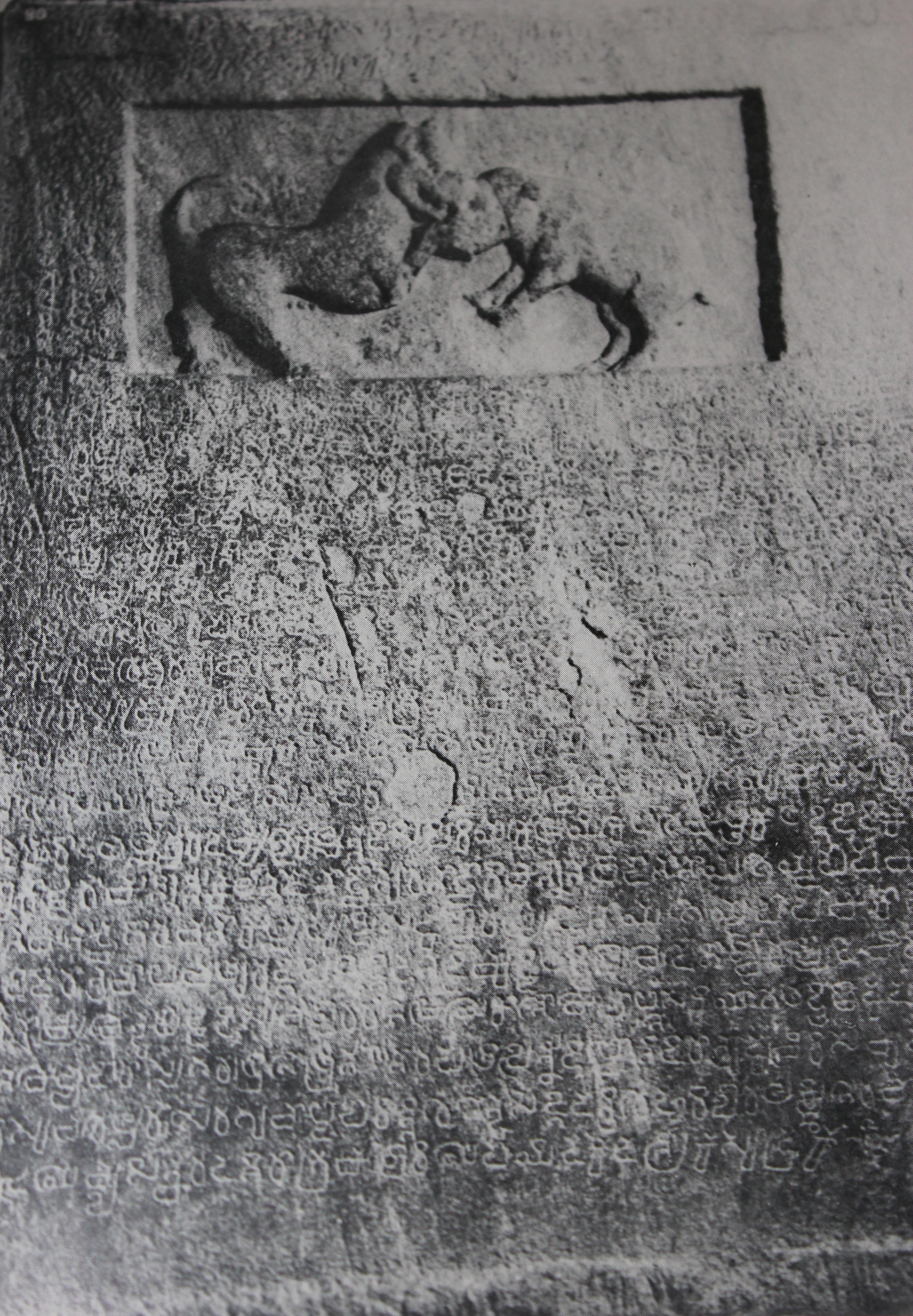

21st Western Ganga King
- Reign: c. 938 – c. 961 CE
- Predecessor: Rachamalla III
- Successor: Marulaganga Neetimarga
- Dynasty: Western Ganga
- Religion: Jainism

Butuga II (reigned c. 938 – c. 961 CE) was one of the great rulers of the Western Ganga dynasty in southern India. He became the ruler of the Western Ganga Dynasty after his elder brother Rachamalla III. He served as an ally and feudatory of the Rashtrakuta dynasty under emperor Krishna III.

Butuga II is widely known for his decisive role in the Battle of Takkolam and killing of the Chola king Rajaditya with a well aimed arrow when the Chola king was seated on his elephant Butuga shot him with an arrow Rajaditya was struck and killed instantly. his death caused panic and collapse in the Chola army. which led to a major Rashtrakuta–Ganga victory against the Cholas. This achievement established Butuga II’s reputation as one of the most celebrated Ganga kings.

He was a disciple of the Jain monk Ajitasena Bhattaraka.

== Relations with Rashtrakutas ==
In order to ascend the throne he had to first seek help from the Rashtrakutas who were hitherto their arch enemies. Butuga II first helped Amoghavarsha III regain many lost territories and in turn was helped by the Rashtrakuta ruler to overthrow Rachamalla III, the unpopular Ganga king at that time. This helped forge a strong relationship between the Gangas and the Rashtrakutas, an alliance that lasted till the end of both kingdoms. Butuga II became the son-in-law of Amoghavarsha III by marrying his daughter Revakanimmadi. He also helped the Rashtrakutas defeat the Cholas in c. 949 in the Battle of Takkolam when he killed the chola monarch According to the Shravanabelagola record says Rajaditya was fighting on top of a war elephant when Butuga shot him with an arrow (or a set of arrows). Rajaditya was struck and killed instantly — his death caused panic and collapse in the Chola army. which led to a major Rashtrakuta–Ganga victory against the Cholas. As a Rashtrakuta feudatory, he not only ruled Gangavadi but also many areas in the Malaprabha River basin and the Krishna River-Tungabhadra doab. With his immense contribution to a Rashtrakuta victory over the Cholas, Butuga II also took charge of the Banavasi region as a fief from Rashtrakuta King Krishna III. Krishna III granted him territories in the Tungabhadra region and significant autonomy over his kingdom.

== Religion and Patronage ==
Like all Western Ganga rulers, Butuga II was a follower of Jainism. He also recorded as a disciple of the Jain monk Ajitasena Bhattaraka, under whom he is said to have received spiritual guidance. Inscriptions refer to his grants for the maintenance of Jain basadis, Butuga II and his minister Chavundaraya both stunch devoted Jains, eracted the Gommateshwara monolith in 943 CE at Shravnabelgola.

He was not only a valorous soldier but also a noted scholar. He is said to have a defeated a Buddhist scholar in a (Jain-Buddhist) religious discourse and the Kudlur record speaks of him as a noted poet.

== See also ==
- Battle of Takkolam
- Rashtrakuta dynasty
- Western Ganga dynasty
