= Jewish copper plates of Cochin =

10th-century Indian royal charter

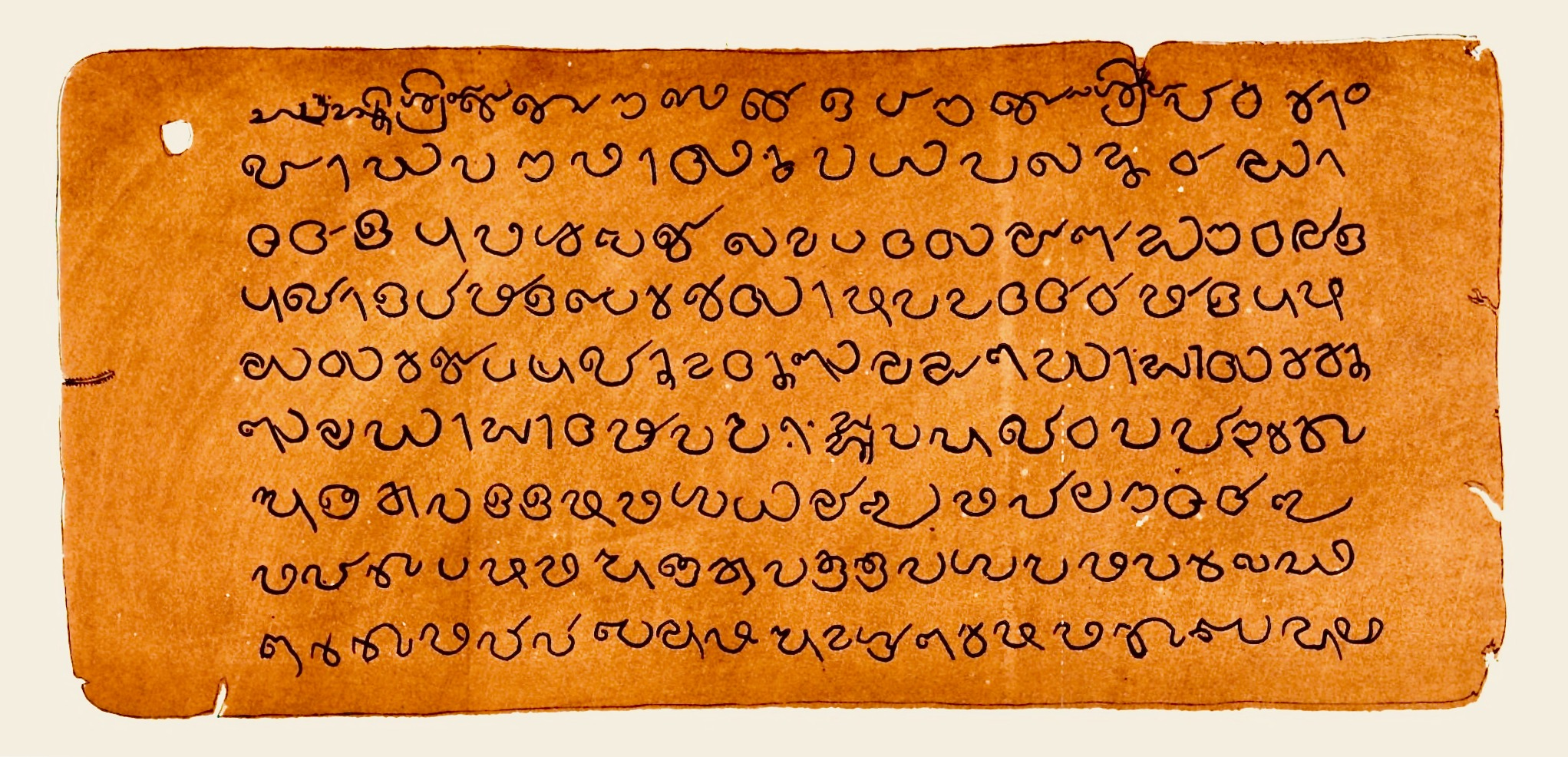
- Jewish copper plates of Cochin (plate I, side I)
- Material: Copper
- Writing: Vatteluttu Script (with Grantha characters)
- Created: c. 1000 CE
- Discovered: Kochi, India
- Language: Old Malayalam

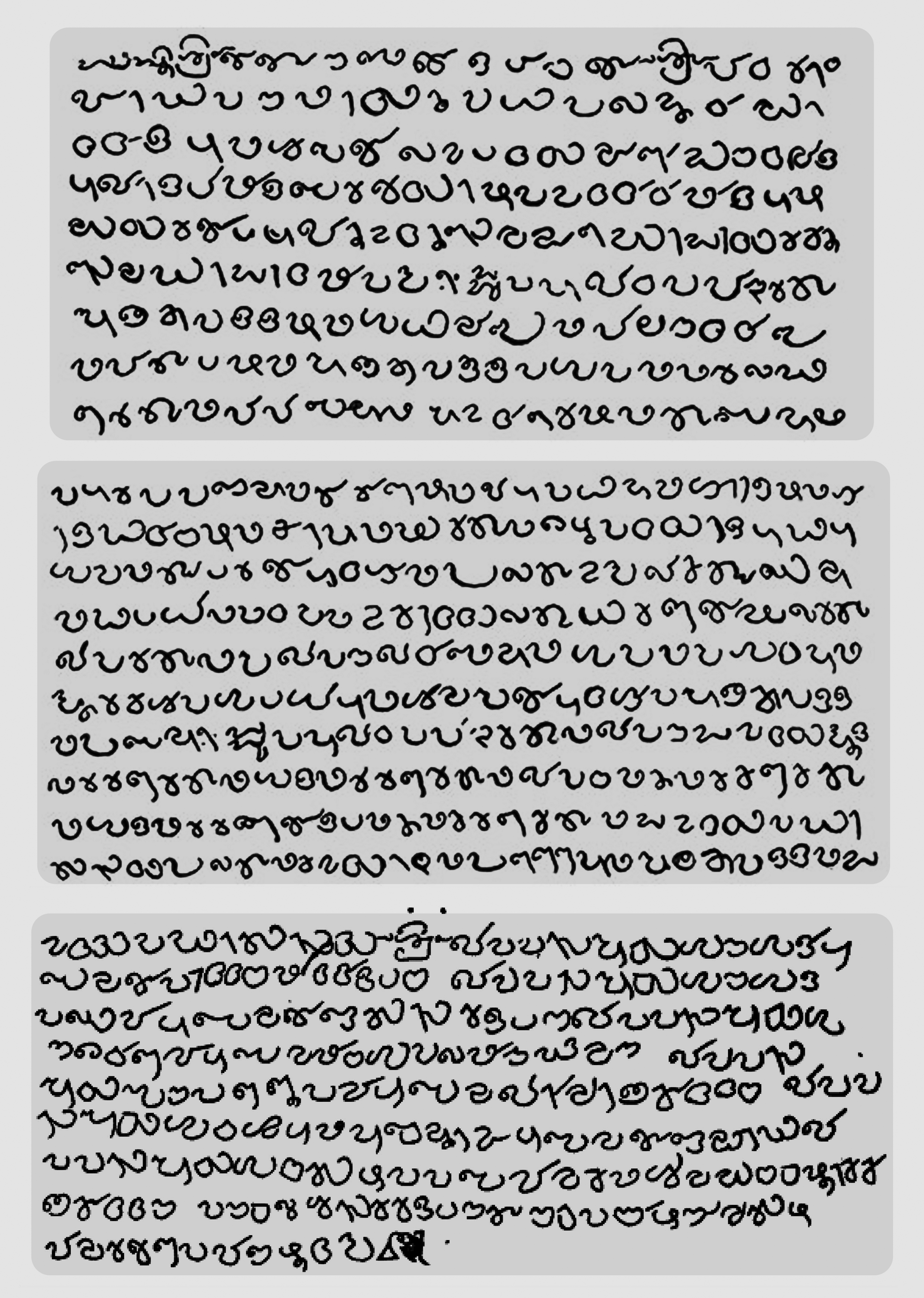
Jewish copper plates (c.1000 CE)

The Jewish copper plates of Cochin, also known as the Cochin plates of Parkara Eravi-varman, is a royal charter issued by Bhaskara Eravi, the medieval Chera ruler of Kerala, south India, to Joseph Rabban, a Jewish merchant magnate of the port of Mahodayapuram-Kodungallur. The charter notably demonstrates the status and importance of Jewish merchants on the medieval Malabar Coast. Historians generally date the copper plate inscription to c. 1000 CE.

The charter is engraved in the vernacular language of medieval Kerala, using the Vattezhuthu (script) with necessary Grantha characters, on three sides of two copper plates comprising 28 lines. It records a grant by king Bhaskara Ravi (fl. c. 959–1025 CE) to Joseph (Yusuf) Rabban of the rights of merchant guild anjuman (anjuvannam) on the Malabar Coast, together with several other commercial rights and aristocratic privileges. Rabban is exempted from all payments made by other settlers in the port city of Muyirikkode (Kodungallur), while at the same time enjoying all the rights accorded to them. These rights and privileges are granted in perpetuity to him and all his descendants. The document is attested by a number of chieftains from southern and northern Kerala and by the military Commander of the Eastern Forces.

Anjuvannam, the Old Malayalam form of "hanjamana/anjuman" was a south Indian merchant guild organised by Jewish, Christian, and Islamic merchants from the Middle East. The tone of the copper plates also suggests that the Jews were not newcomers to the Malabar Coast at the time the charter was issued.

The plates are carefully preserved in an iron box, known as the Pandeal, within the Paradesi Synagogue at Mattancherry, Cochin.

== Text ==
The plate is engraved in the vernacular language of medieval Kerala, using the Vattezhuthu (script) with additional Grantha characters. The charter ends with a list of witnesses to the deed, including several chieftains of southern and northern Kerala, the Commander of the Eastern Forces, and the Officer who Takes Down Oral Communication.

Hail Prosperity! This is the gift that His Majesty, King of Kings, Sri Bhaskara Ravi Varman, who is to wield sceptre for several thousand years, was pleased to make during the thirty sixth year opposite to the second year of his reign, on the day when he was pleased to reside at Muyirikkode (Muyirikode).

We have granted to Joseph Rabban, the Ancuvannam, tolls by the boat and by carts (other vehicles), Ancuvannam dues, the right to employ the day lamp, decorative cloth, palanquin, umbrella, kettledrum, trumpet, gateway, arch, arched roof, weapon(s) and rest of the seventy two privileges. We have remitted duty (customs dues) and weighing fee.

Moreover, according to this copper-plate grant given to him, he shall be exempted from payments made by other settlers in the town to the king, but he shall enjoy what they enjoy.

To Joseph Rabban, proprietor of the Ancuvannam, his male and female issues, nephews, and sons-in-law, Ancuvannam shall belong by hereditary succession. Ancuvannam shall belong to them by hereditary succession as long as the world, sun and moon endure — Prosperity!

This is attested by Govarthana Marthanda (Marthandan), Governor [sic] of Venadu.

This is attested by Kota Cirikantan, Governor of Vempalinadu.

This is attested by Manavepala Manaviyan, Governor of Eralanadu.

This is attested by Rayiran Chattan (Chathan), Governor of Valluvanadu.

This is attested by Kota Iravi, Governor of Netumpurayurnadu.

This is attested by Murkkan Chattan (Chathan), Commander of the Eastern Forces (forces).

This writing is executed by Vanralaceri (Vanralacheri) Kantan (Kandan) Kunrappolan, the officer who takes down oral communication (messages).

— Translated by M. G. S. Narayanan ('Cultural Symbiosis in Kerala', 1972)

== Dating and analysis ==
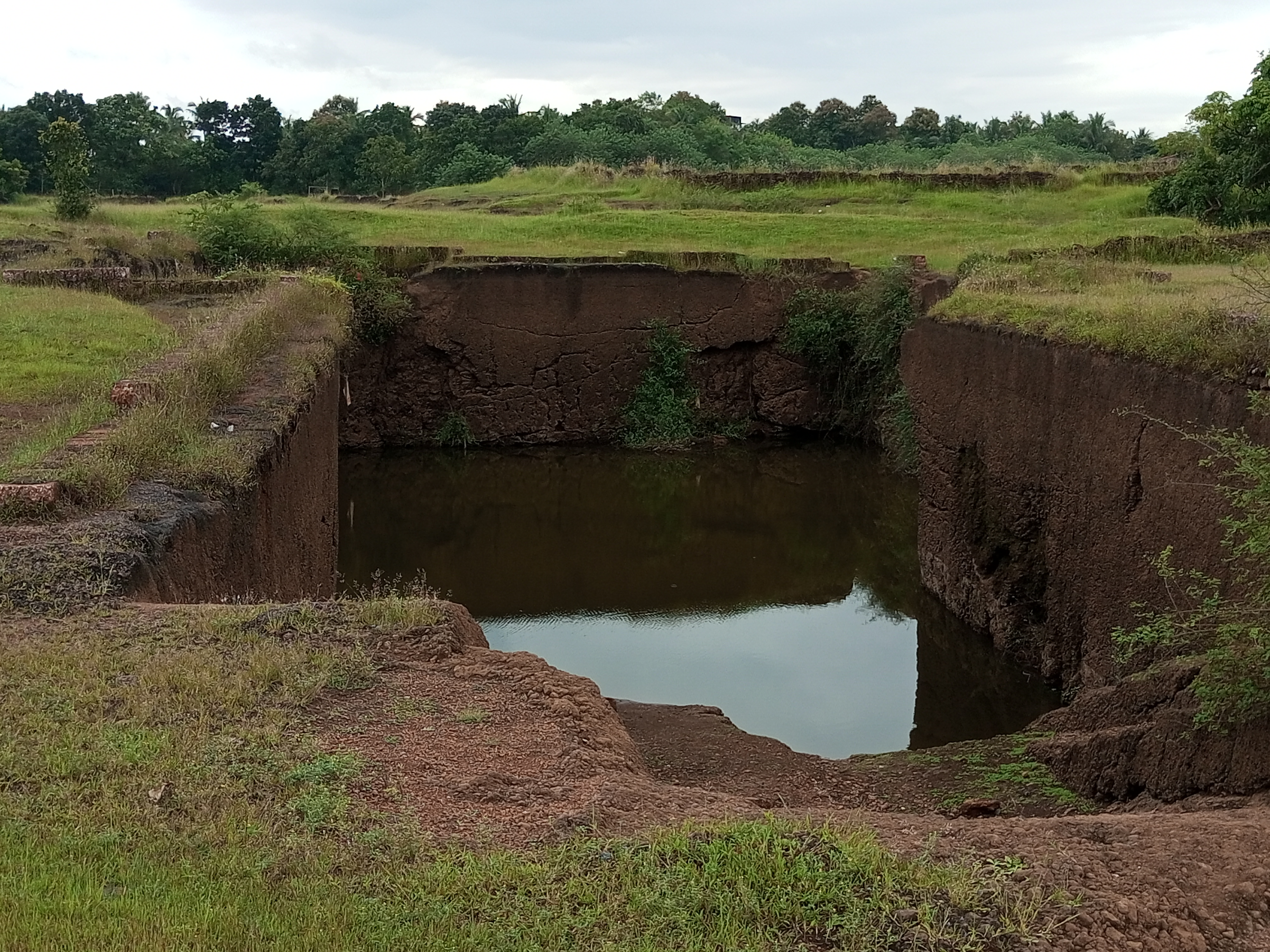
Juthakkulam (the Jew's Tank?) at Madayi, Cannanore.

It is evident from the language of the Jewish copper plates that the Jews were not newcomers to the Malabar Coast at the time of their decree. The language of the plates "certainly prove[s] that they [the Jews] were present in the midst of the local people [of Kerala] for at least several generations, if not centuries". Historian Nathan Katz states that the Cochin Jews trace their history to many centuries earlier for good reasons; yet these plates are more likely from the 10th or 11th century CE.

=== Traditional datings ===
One tradition among the Cochin Jews dates the Jewish copper plates to the 4th century CE (379 CE). The plates have, however, been assigned dates ranging from the 4th to the 11th century CE. A 17th century CE letter from the Cochin Jewish community places the grant in the year 4520 after the Creation, corresponding to 490 CE (5th century CE).

=== Scholarly dating ===
The inscription is dated to the 38th regnal year of Chera ruler Bhaskara Ravi (given as "the thirty sixth year opposite to the second year of his reign", a style of dating fairly common in the Chera country). The year of investiture of Bhaskara Ravi, a contemporary of the Chola ruler Rajendra, was found to be c. 962 CE, and hence the plates were dated to c. 1000 CE. Prominent historians, such as Y. Subbarayalu, Ranabir Chakravarti, Noboru Karashima, Kesavan Veluthat, Pius Malekandathil, Elizabeth Lambourn, Ophira Gamliel, and Manu Devadevan generally agree with the c. 1000/1001 CE dating.

Some recent findings (Devadevan, 2020) slightly modify the initial year of Bhaskara Ravi's reign (from c. 962/63 CE to c. 959/60 CE).

=== Political context ===
The decree of the plates by the medieval Chera ruler of Kerala can be taken in the context of the expansion of the neighboring Chola Empire (and the possible constant threats, including those of military action, from them). The Jewish merchants of Kerala likely already supported the Chera state, and once the Chola attacks on Kerala began (in c. late 10th century CE), these plates and the rights granted therein were "quite possibly" the reward for the financial or military assistance and support provided by the Jewish merchants to the Chera ruler at Mahodayapuram-Kodungallur.

== Legacy ==
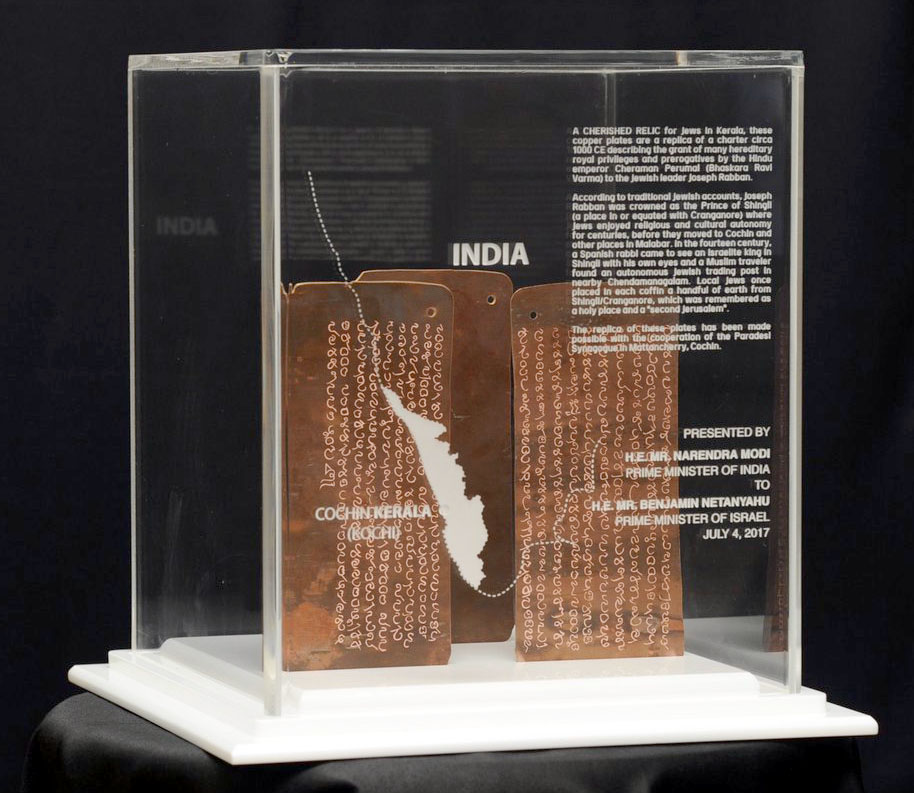
A modern replica of the Jewish copper plates presented by the Prime Minister of India to the Prime Minister of Israel.

The grant was cherished by both the "Black Jews" and the "White Jews" (the Spanish Jews) of Cochin as a historical document and as their "original" deed of settlement.

- During the visit of Prime Minister Ariel Sharon to India in 2003, the then provincial tourism minister presented him with a replica of the Jewish copper plates.
- Similar replicas were also gifted by Prime Minister Narendra Modi to Prime Minister Benjamin Netanyahu during a state visit to Israel in 2017.

== See also ==
- Quilon Syrian copper plates
- Thomas of Cana copper plates
