= Keralolpathi =

Malayalam Hindu prose chronicle

- The Origin of Malabar
- Keralolpathi (Gundert/2nd Edition, 1868)
- Author(s): Unknown
- Ascribed to: Thunchaththu Ezhuthachan
- Language: Malayalam
- Date: Disputed (c. 16th–19th century AD)
- First printed edition: Gundert Version, 1843
- Genre: Pre-Colonial Historiography
- Subject: Legendary History of Kerala
- Text: Keralolpathi at Wikisource

The Keralolpathi (Malayalam: കേരളോല്പത്തി; IAST: Kēraḷōlpatti; transl. Origin of Kerala), formerly transliterated as "Kerala Ulpathy", is a Malayalam Hindu prose chronicle that deals with the mythical origins and legends of Kerala in southern India.

The Keralolpathi covers the legendary history of Kerala and its people from ancient times through the medieval period to the colonial era, serving as an early attempt to historicize Kerala as a distinct entity. The narrative is generally regarded by scholars as "an expression of the historical consciousness" rather than "a source of history". The text contains multiple historical layers, with the earliest influenced by Nambudiri-Brahmins and the later ones shaped by non-Brahmin (Nair) regional rulers. Some versions of the Keralolpathi were likely intended for public or community performance.

The currently available Keralolpathi texts were primarily composed in the Calicut (Samoothiri) and Cannanore (Kolathiri) countries of northern Kerala. The tradition was also adapted by the rulers of Cochin (Perumpadappu) in central Kerala.

The date of the Keralolpathi remains a subject of debate among Kerala historians. The existing versions of the text are generally dated between the 15th and 19th centuries AD. By the 18th century AD, modified versions of the text had begun to appear, varying from kingdom to kingdom and region to region across different parts of Kerala.

== Extant versions ==
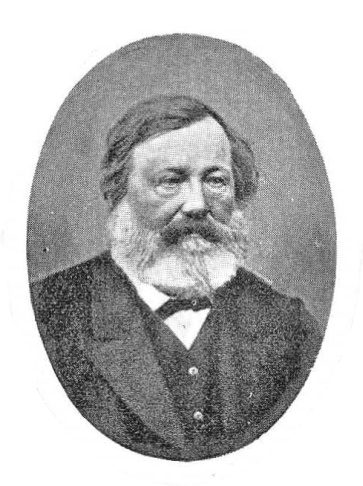
Hermann Gundert

The Keralolpathi text exists in numerous manuscripts and multiple versions. The Tamil text "Keraladesha Varalaru" and parts of the Sanskrit text "Kerala Mahatmayam" notably employ the Keralolpathi tradition. The authorship of Keralolpathi is traditionally attributed to Thunchaththu Ramanujan Ezhuthachan, the renowned 17th-century scholar from northern Kerala.

1. Gundert Version (Mangalore, 1843; 2nd ed. 1868)
  - Reprinted by Skaria Zachariah (Kottayam, 1992)
  - Reprinted by K. Mahadeva Sastrikal (Trivandrum, 1939)
  - Reprinted by S. K. Nair (Madras, 1953)
2. Trichur Version (no date; 2nd ed. 1930–1)
3. Three versions by M. R. R. Varier (Calicut, 1984)
4. Two versions by S. Rajendu (Perinthalmanna, 2012)
  - One of which is titled Kerala Mahatmayam
5. Kerala Visesha Mahatmayam by P. K. N. Kumara Pillai (Cochin, 1876).
6. Trichur Version Appendix
7. Kilippattu Version (Kottakkal, 1909)
8. Velayudhan Panikkasserry Versions (reproduction without acknowledgement, the Trivandrum and Trichur versions)

=== Recent discoveries ===
- Several details found in the Keralolpathi text regarding early medieval Kerala were confirmed by archaeological/inscriptional evidence in the late 1960s and early 1970s. These include the attestation of the 32 Brahmin villages in Kerala, the confirmation of Mahodayapuram (Kodungallur) as the capital of the kingdom of Kerala/Chera, evidence of matrilineal succession in the Chera family, the use of the title 'Perumals' for Chera rulers, the heavy Brahmanical influence in the Chera court, and the presence of the powerful Brahmin council known as "Nalu Thali".
- The accumulation of multiple historical layers in the extant Keralolpathi text was identified by historian Kesavan Veluthat in 2009. The oldest layers of the text were influenced by the Kerala Brahmins, while the latest layers were dominated by non-Brahmin regional chiefs, with minimal Brahmin influence on the narrative.
- It has also been suggested that the Keralolpathi text was intended for and used in public or community-based performances rather than private reading (2019).

== Contents ==
The currently extant versions of Keralolpathi are composed in heavily Sanskritized Malayalam prose. There are numerous versions of the text available, many of which exist in print editions. The texts are written from the perspective of Kerala's 17th- and 18th-century elites.

Keralolpathi traditions usually begin with an account of the god Parashurama creating Kerala (and Tulu country) by reclaiming it from the sea with a toss of his sacred battle axe (the Parasurama tradition). He then settled the land with Brahmins brought from "the north", establishing 64 villages, 32 of which were located in present-day Kerala. The Brahmins initially brought and settled refused to stay, returning to their original northern homeland out of fear of the ancient "serpents" of the land. In response, Parashurama brought "a second wave" of Brahmins. To prevent them from being accepted back if they attempted to return north, he "altered" their sacred hairstyle and dress code. Parashurama also convinced the Brahmin community to adopt "matrilineal descent" as a way to atone for his own matricidal sin. However, only one village, Payyannur in the north, complied with his request. As a result, he brought Shudras from other regions and established matriliny among them. He then sanctified 108 temples dedicated to gods Shiva, Shastha, and goddess Durga. Following this, he selected 36,000 Brahmins from various settlements and granted them "the right to carry weapons", sanctioning them to defend their land independently like the Kshatriyas, thus ruling Kerala as "brahmakshatra". He also introduced sacred rites, rituals, duties, and entitlements of Kerala.

Over time, however, the Brahmin rulers of Kerala, represented by the Four Kazhakams (the four settlements of Perunchellur, Payyannur, Paravur, and Chengannur), realized that governing the land compromised their integrity. They decided to appoint a Kshatriya as their king (during a meeting at Tirunavaya). Accordingly, a Kshatriya prince and his sister were invited to Kerala. The brother was anointed as king, the Perumal, by the Brahmins, who required him to pledge "unwavering loyalty" to the Brahmin councilors. It was decided that the descendants of the royal princess and a Kerala Brahmin would inherit the throne of Kerala, ensuring that the offspring belonged to the Kshatriya varna under matrilineal descent. The Brahmins also arranged that each Kshatriya king should rule over Kerala for twelve years.

Keralolpathi provides a detailed account of the various castes in Kerala. At the time of Parashurama’s retirement, Kerala had only two communities: the Brahmins and the Shudras. The complex caste system was later established by the last Kshatriya king. The text attributes the structuring of the caste system in Kerala to the famous philosopher Shankara. Different variations of the Keralolpathi text address the origin of castes in varying degrees of detail, with some providing more extensive explanations than others.

The text then presents an extensive list of distinguished kings, called Cheraman Perumals, who were "brought" from other regions to govern Kerala, along with narratives of their heroic deeds. The era of the Perumal rulers concludes with the long reign of a charismatic Cheraman Perumal named "Kulasekhara", who ruled for 36 years. During his reign, his overlord from a country east of the Ghats invaded Kerala with a vast army. To repel the invading forces, the king summoned the militia of his chieftains, including the young Manichan and Vikkiran of Eranad in northern Kerala (the Eradis). The Eradis assured the king that they would capture a fort established by the overlord. The battle lasted three days, and the overlord eventually abandoned the fort, which was then seized by the king's troops.

Years later, the same king divided the kingdom among his chieftains/kingsfolk and mysteriously disappeared. Two situations appear to have led to his abdication. First, it is said that he stayed beyond the stipulated twelve-year term as ruler of Kerala, thereby incurring the terrible sin of misappropriating Brahmasvam, or the property of the Brahmins, since Kerala originally belonged to them. To atone for this sin, he sought to propitiate the gods and abdicate the throne. In another version, the king's consort developed a fondness for Padamel Nair, the commander of the king’s Nair forces. However, the commander did not reciprocate her feelings. In retaliation, the "vengeful" queen falsely accused him of making advances toward her. The king summarily ordered his execution but later realized the truth. Filled with remorse for committing such a crime "upon the word of a woman", he believed that the only way to atone was to abdicate the throne and leave everything behind. The people of Kerala never heard from him again.

The final portion of the text provides a detailed account of the rule of regional chiefs who wielded sovereign power in their respective localities following the partition of the unified Kerala state. The last king’s act of donation served as the legal sanction for their authority. For example, the Eradi youths, ancestors of the later kings of Calicut, who had been overlooked during the land allocation at the time of the king’s departure, were later granted the king's sacred sword along with permission to "die, kill, and seize". There is considerable variation among different versions of the text regarding this section.

== Historical reliability ==
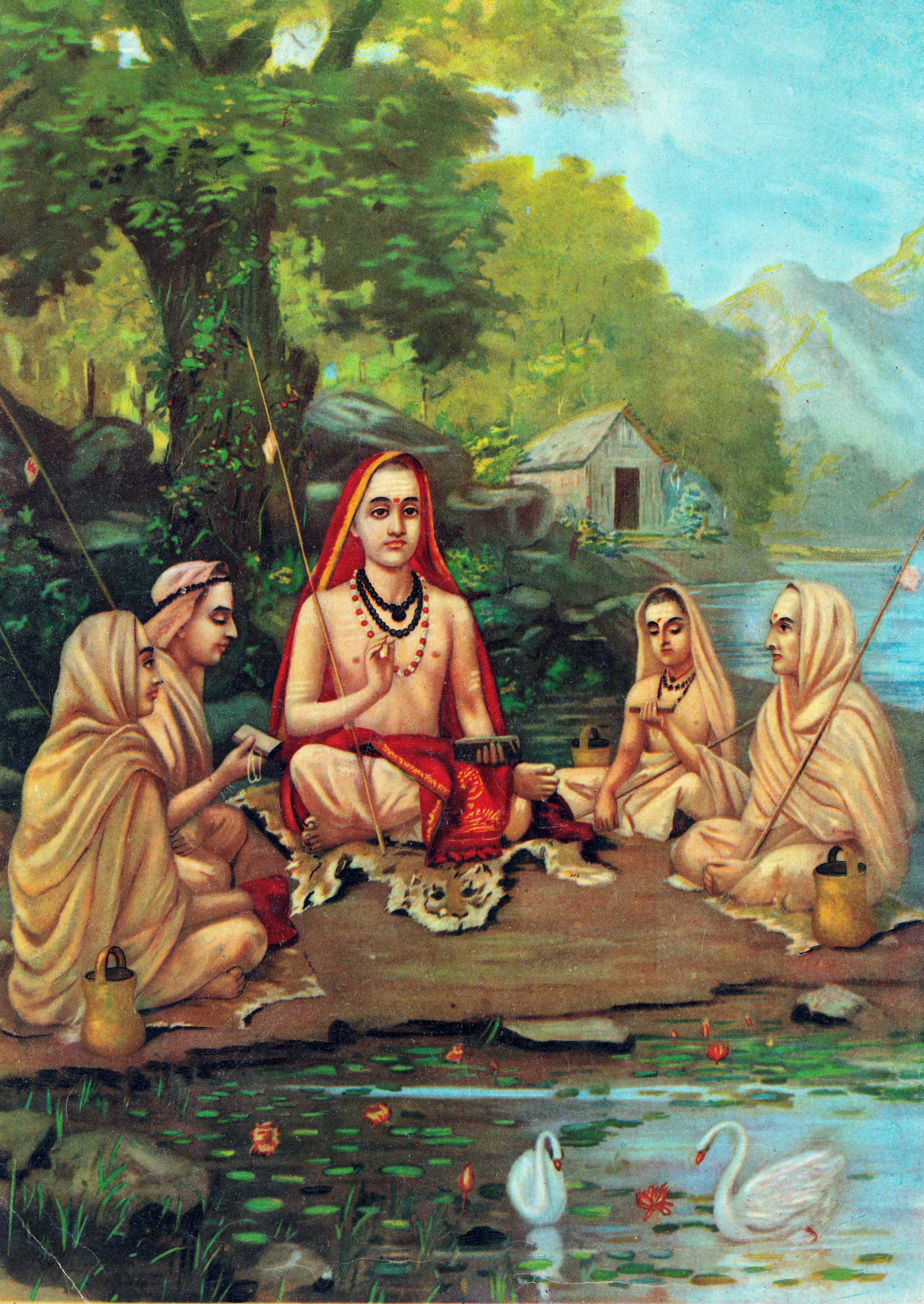
A depiction of Shankara by Raja Ravi Varma (1904)

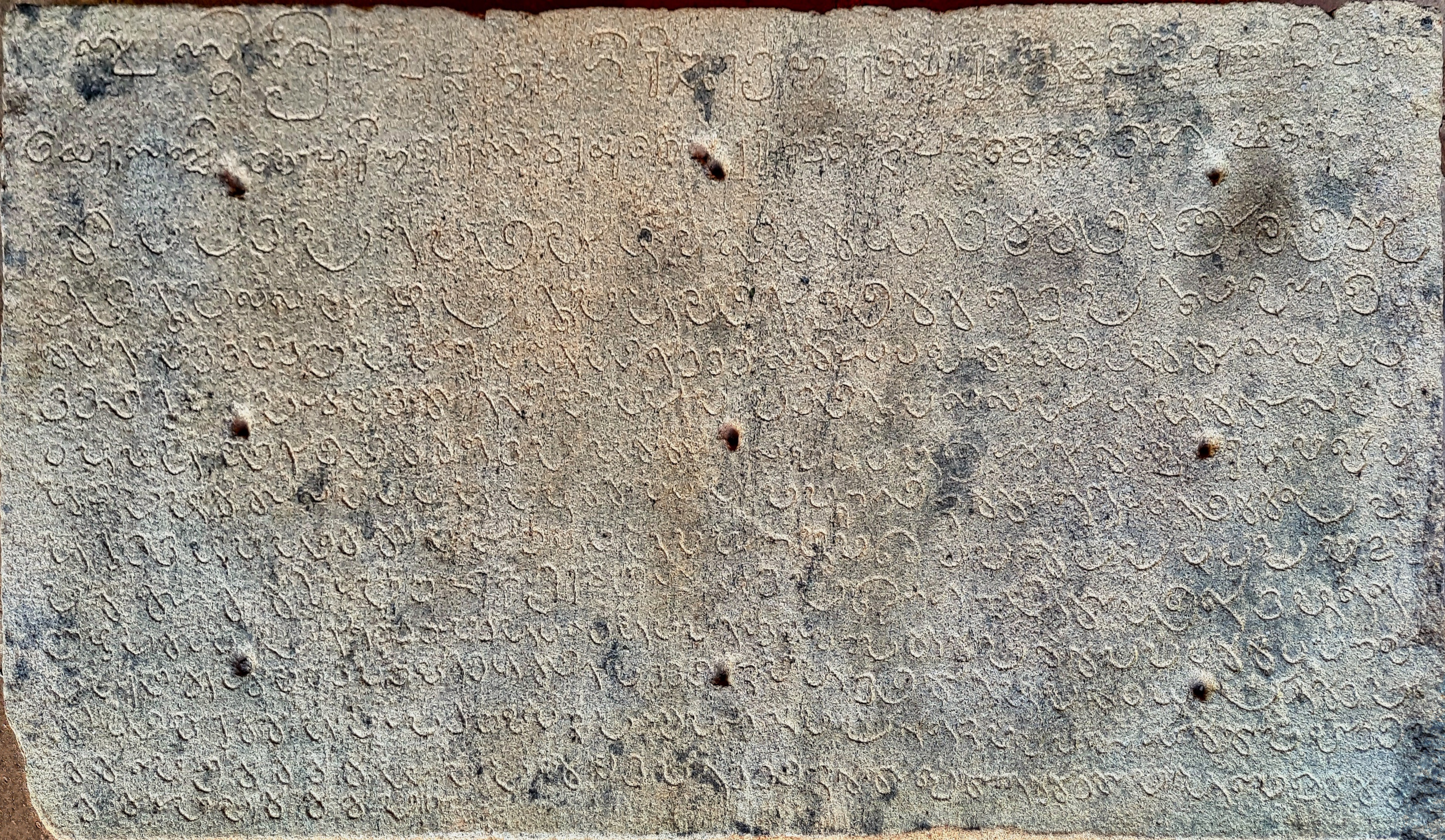
The Iranikulam inscription is a unique record (C35) that mentions the amalgamation of Thiruvalla with the Iranikulam Brahmin village (10th century CE).

Modern historians generally question the historical reliability of the Keralolpathi collection of legends, as it contains numerous historical discrepancies and contradictions — particularly in the names of kings, dates, and geographical details. The narrative is now widely regarded as a reflection of "historical consciousness" rather than a reliable source of history. While the text is considered extremely valuable for understanding the mindsets and political ambitions of Kerala's elites from the 16th to 19th centuries AD, it is argued that it can be used to reconstruct the history of the medieval Chera period only with considerable caution.

- The Keralolpathi does not include details about the early historic (pre-Pallava) Chera rulers and their activities, as recorded in early Tamil literature (the Sangam Literature).
- For instance, the Keralolpathi states that a certain king of Kerala, or the Cheraman Perumal, converted to Islam, traveled to Mecca on a hajj pilgrimage, and met the Islamic prophet Muhammad in the 7th century AD. However, the corresponding date mentioned in the text is before the 6th or 7th century.
- It also claims that Krishna Deva Raya (16th century AD, reigned 1509–1529) of the Vijayanagara Empire appointed a viceroy to rule over Kerala in the 5th century AD, dating it to 428 AD.

According to P. Shungunny Menon, the 19th-century court historian of Travancore, the Keralolpathi cannot be regarded as a reliable historical source. Menon, stated that:

[...] numerous discrepancies and glaring mistakes are visible for we find the authors in their anxiety to prove the correctness of their accounts confusing occurrences of the modern age with those of the ancient...it is obvious that on a work such as the Kerala Ulpathy little reliance can be placed [...]

William Logan, the author of the Malabar Manual (1887), also refutes the validity of the Keralolpathi and describes it as follows:

[...] a farrago of legendary nonsense having for its definite aim the securing of the Brahmin caste of unbounded power and influence in the country [...]

— William Logan

K. P. Padmanabha Menon, another Travancore historian, describes the Keralolpathi text as:

[...] an ill digested and uncollated collection of different versions huddled together in inextricable confusion [...]

— K. P. Padmanabha Menon

=== Modern interpretations ===
Kesavan Veluthat, a prominent historian of medieval Kerala, refers to the text as follows:

Attempts to study it [Keralolpathi] were centred largely on the question of accepting or rejecting the veracity of statements related to the heroes and events in this narrative. The concern of these scholars was with the historicity or otherwise of the narrative, rather than the historical consciousness expressed in it, or the form chosen to express it and the social function that it performed. Thus, they failed to identify or appreciate it as an expression, through the medium of performance, of the sense of history shown by sections of Kerala society.

— Kesavan Veluthat

Dilip M. Menon, another prominent historian of Kerala, examines how the Keralolpathi legends influenced local historical consciousness and presents an alternative perspectives on the concept of time. Menon challenges the conventional dismissal of the Keralolpathi text as mere fiction by arguing that it reveals how pre-modern Kerala understood its past, power structures, and social hierarchies. He also highlights how the text served to justify medieval Brahminical authority and regional political claims in Kerala.

The chronology of the puranas encompasses vast swathes of time, and local histories have an idea of a past that is both distant and near at the same time...The "Keralolpatti" itself may be a northern tradition and could be said to bear the impress of early colonialism and its search for legitimating histories that would allow an easier transition to East India Company rule.

— Dilip M. Menon (2020)

Manu Devadevan, historian of pre-modern India, describes the Keralolpathi text as follows:

Latter-day works, like the Kēraḷōlpatti and the Kēraḷamāhātmyaṃ, tell us more about the historical memories that a section of the 17th- and 18th-century elites from Malabar chose to cherish. These texts are invaluable for understanding the mentalities and political aspirations of the period when they were put together, but they can be relied upon for reconstructing an earlier period only with considerable circumspection.

— Manu Devadevan (2020)

== See also ==
- Parasurama
- Nair
