= R. Champakalakshmi =

Indian historian and social scientist (1932–2024)

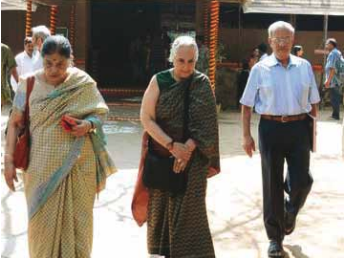
- Champakalakshmi (left) at the Kalakshetra Foundation (2014)
- Born: 1932; Srirangam, Tiruchirappalli, Madras Presidency, British India (present-day Tamil Nadu, India)
- Died: 28 January 2024 (aged 91–92)
- Occupations: Historian and social scientist
- Relatives: R. Jayalakshmi (sister)

Academic background
- Education: University of Madras
- Doctoral advisor: T. V. Mahalingam

Academic work
- Discipline: South Indian history
- Institutions: Jawaharlal Nehru University

Rangachari Champakalakshmi (Note: Though many of the bibliographic sources indicate Champakalakshmi's first name as Radha, her first name is most likely Rangachari (alternately spelled as Rangachary), a patronymic reference to her father's name.) (1932 – 28 January 2024) was an Indian historian and social scientist whose work focused on the study of early and pre-modern South Indian history. She served as a professor in the Centre for Historical Studies, Jawaharlal Nehru University (JNU). In addition, Champakalakshmi was president of the Indian History Congress.

== Early life ==
Champakalakshmi was born in 1932 to Pattammal (mother) and R. Rangachari (father) in a family from Srirangam in present-day Tamil Nadu. Her father was an advocate. Champakalakshmi obtained a doctorate in history from the University of Madras. Her doctoral dissertation under historian T. V. Mahalingam, was on Vaishnava iconography in Tamil Nadu, a topic that she continued to research later into her career.

== Career ==
Champakalakshmi started her academic career teaching at the University of Madras from 1959 to 1972, after which she joined the Centre for Historical Studies at the Jawaharlal Nehru University (JNU) as an associate professor of ancient history, where she continued to teach for the next 25 years, until her retirement in 1997. She started her research studying religion, specifically Jainism and Vaishnava Hinduism in ancient South India, and later expanded her research to include trade, economy, and emergence of urban centers in pre-medieval South India. Some of her research was published in a book Vaishnava iconography (1981). As a part of this work, she brought together evidence from Tamil Sangam literature, the Bhakti movement of the Alvars, the Agama traditions, and combined this with extensive fieldwork to bring out the distinct medieval period iconography of the Vaishnavism faith.

Some of her later works studying the social, cultural, and economic history of early and medieval South India were published in Trade, Ideology and Urbanization (1996) and Religion, Tradition and Ideology (2011). The latter was a collection of essays discussing the contribution of religious traditions to the social capital in pre-colonial south India. She wrote about growth of urban centers under the Pallavas and Cholas including Kumbakonam and Thanjavur in the Cauvery delta region, and Kanchipuram in the Palar valley among other centers.

In addition to serving as a professor at the JNU, Champakalakshmi also served as a president of the Indian History Congress. She taught many famous students at her time at JNU, including Kesavan Veluthat, Rajan Gurukkal, Manu V. Devadevan, and K. N. Ganesh. She was a script consultant for Bharat Ek Khoj, a 1980s Indian television series based on Jawaharlal Nehru's The Discovery of India. Many of Champakalakshmi's collections are held at the Roja Muthiah Research Library in Chennai.

== Personal life ==
Champakalakshmi's sister R. Jayalakshmi was a carnatic musician and one half of the duo Radha Jayalakshmi with her cousin Radha. Her other sister R. Vanaja was a numismatist with the National Museum of India in New Delhi. Champakalakshmi died on 28 January 2024.

== Select works ==
=== Books and monographs ===
- Champakalakshmi, R. (1981). Vaiṣṇava Iconography in the Tamil Country. Orient Longman. ISBN 978-0-86131-216-0.
- Champakalakshmi, R. (1996). Trade, Ideology, and Urbanization: South India 300 BC to AD 1300. Oxford University Press. ISBN 978-0-19-563870-7.
- Champakalakshmi, R. (2001). Tradition, Dissent and Ideology: Essays in Honour of Romila Thapar. New Delhi: Oxford University Press. ISBN 9780195654424. OL 9869061M.
- Champakalakshmi, R.; Kris, Usha (2001). The Hindu Temple. Roli Books. ISBN 978-81-7436-094-6. OL 18662304M.
- Champakalakshmi, R. (2002). State and Society in Pre-modern South India. Cosmobooks.
- Champakalakshmi, R. (2011). Religion, Tradition, and Ideology: Pre-colonial South India. New Delhi: Oxford University Press. ISBN 978-0-19-807059-7.

=== Other works ===
- Champakalakshmi, R. (1987). "Urbanisation in South India: The Role of Ideology and Polity". Social Scientist. 15 (8/9): 67–117. doi:10.2307/3520287. ISSN 0970-0293. JSTOR 3520287.
- Champakalakshmi, R. (1994). "Patikam Pātuvār: Ritual Singing as a Means of Communication in Early Medieval South India". Studies in History. 10 (2): 199–215. doi:10.1177/025764309401000203. ISSN 0257-6430. S2CID 163010468.
- Champakalakshmi, R. (2009). "The Making of a Religious Tradition: Perspectives from Pre-Colonial South India". Proceedings of the Indian History Congress. 70: 1–24. ISSN 2249-1937. JSTOR 44147652.
