= K. P. Padmanabha Menon =

Indian historian

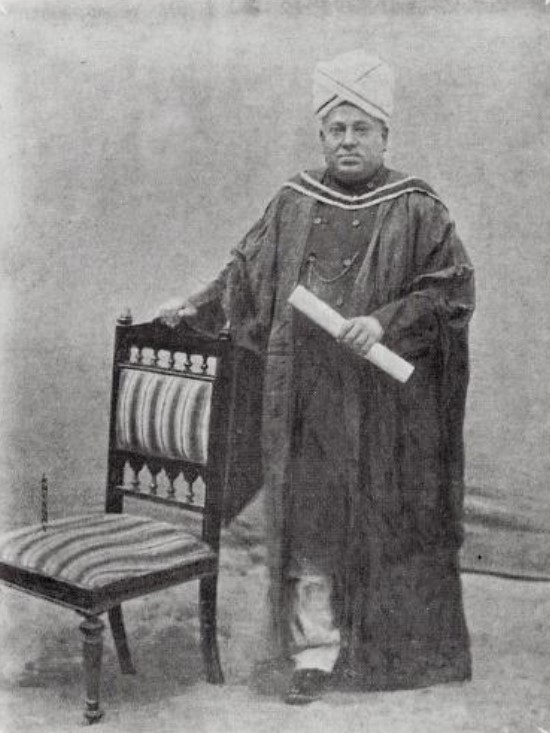
K. P. Padmanabha Menon (1857-1919)

K. P. Padhmanabha Menon, MRAS (1857-1919) was an Indian historian and lawyer. He is best known as the author of History of Kerala and History of Cochin.

== Early life ==
He was born in October 1857 at Elamakkara, near Edappally. He was the son of P. Sankunni Menon, Diwan Peishcar of Travancore and the author of A History of Travancore, one of the earlier scholarly works on the history of Travancore, and Parvati Amma. He was the youngest of the three children born to the couple. After graduating in law, Menon became an apprentice under Sir H. H. Sheppard, who was the then Advocate-General to the Government of Madras. Sheppard subsequently became a judge of the Madras High Court and later served as the legal adviser to the Secretary of State for India.

In 1885, in order to care for his mother during her advanced years, Menon settled in Ernakulam, where he began legal practice before the Appeal Court of the Cochin State. In 1899, he moved to Travancore. He was thereafter nominated by the Government of Travancore as a non-official member of the Legislative Council. Subsequently, Menon was elected by the public as a member of the Marumakkathayam Committee, which was constituted to reform the laws and customary practices of the Nayar community. He later served on a committee appointed by the Government of Cochin, whose report ultimately led to the enactment of the Nayar Regulation.

== Writing career ==
Menon's History of Kerala in four volumes with 2,500 pages was completed in 1910. Padmanabha Menon used a portion of the Aluva Palace for this work. The work was published in 1924, five years after his death. Menon also wrote History of Cochin (Kochirajya Charitram), a history of the Kingdom of Cochin, in two volumes, published in 1912 and 1914 respectively. K. P. Padmanabha Menon introduced the method of social history and is regarded as the first modern historian of Kerala.
