= Iranikulam =

Village in Thrissur District, Kerala, India

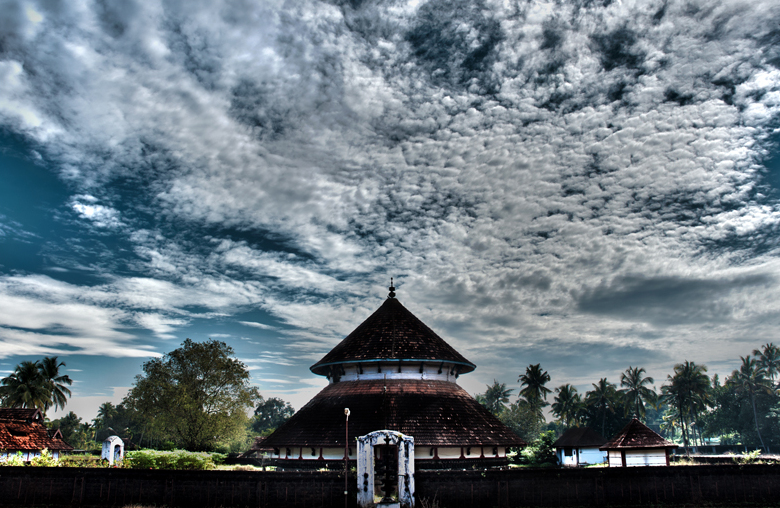

Iranikulam is a village in the southern part of Thrissur district in Kerala, India. It is considered one of the oldest villages in Kerala. Iranikulam is one of the 64 Brahmin villages in Kerala. One of the oldest Shiva temples is situated here. Iranikulam is famous for its culture. Most of the people in this village are farmers. The Temple is one of the few temples in the world where Shiva & Parvati are both consecrated under the same roof. Population of this village is very low compared to other villages in Kerala. Government school of this village is one of the oldest.

== Gallery ==
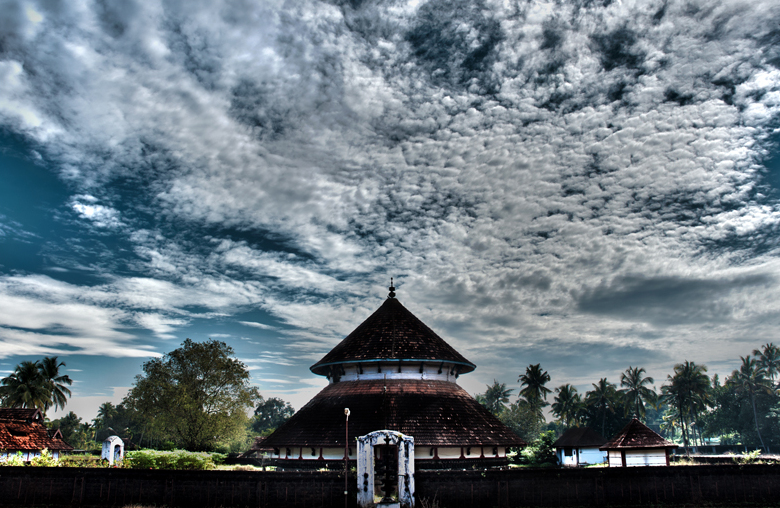
IranikulamMahadeva Temple

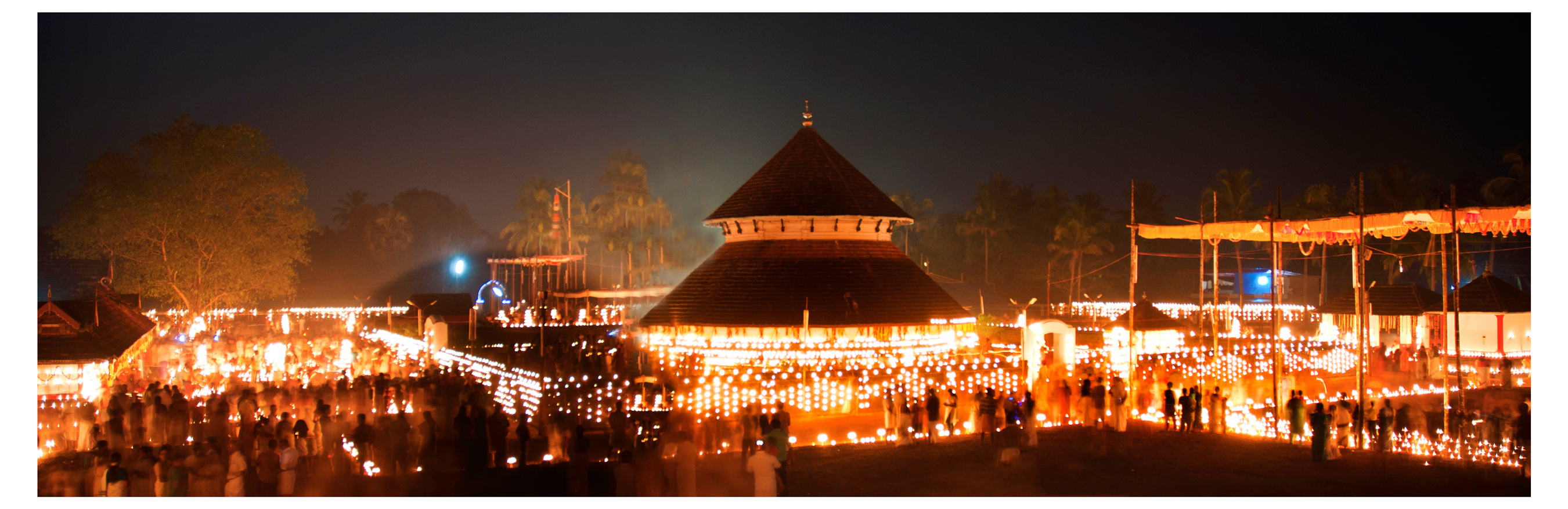
Temple lit up during the Yearly Festival held around December- January

== See also ==
- Iranikulam Sree Mahadeva Temple
