= Aluva Palace =

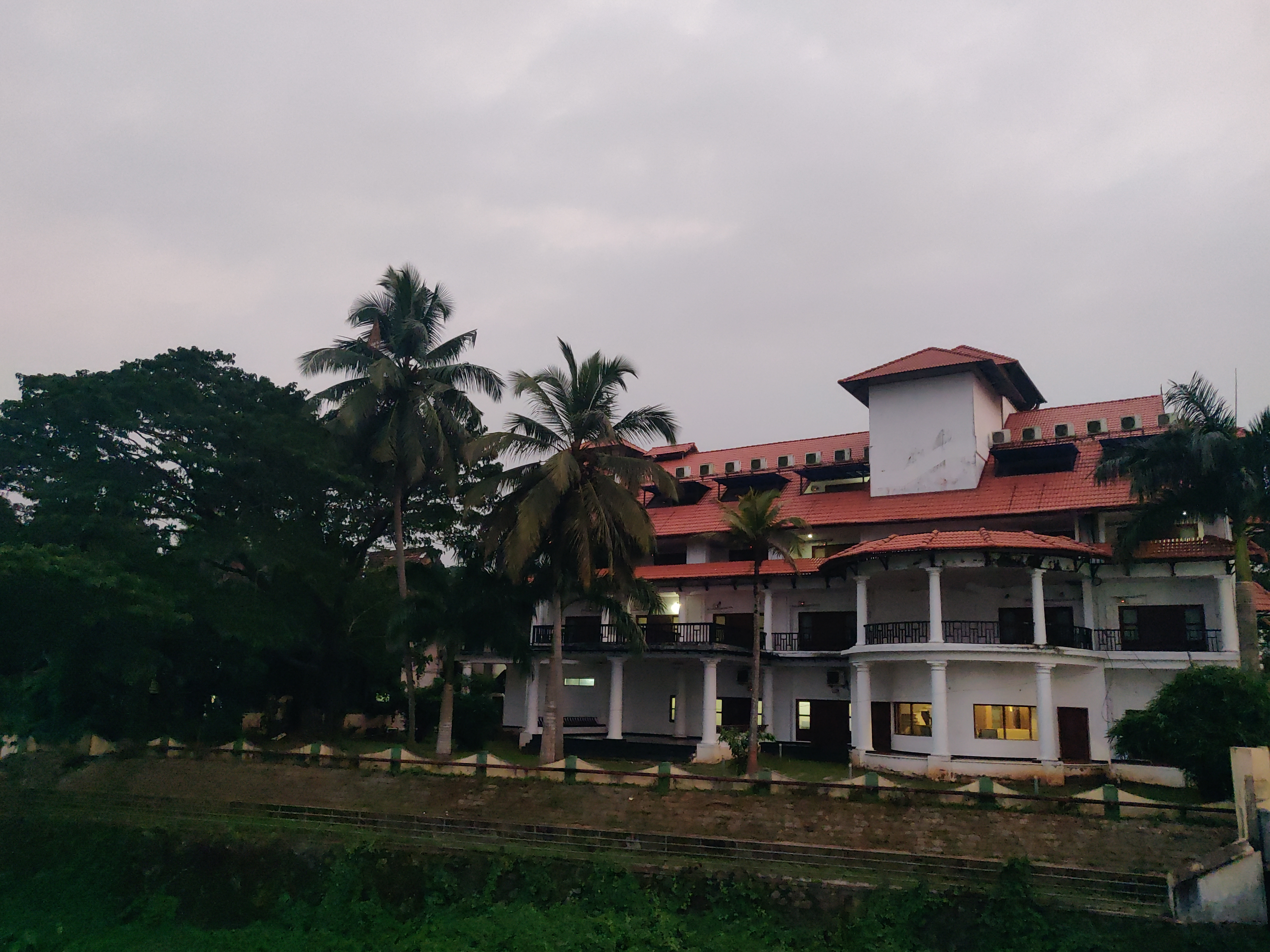
- Aluva Palace View from Periyar River side.
- Interactive map of the Aluva Palace area

General information
- Architectural style: Kerala architecture
- Location: Aluva, India
- Coordinates: 10°6′38″N 76°20′58″E
- Client: Maharaja of Travancore

The Aluva Palace, also known as Alwaye Palace, is a Travancore royal palace built by king Maharaja Karthika Thirunal Dharma Raja around 1790 during the reign of the Chera kings of Travancore. Aluva Palace is situated near the city Kochi, Ernakulam district of the state of Kerala.

== Historical importance ==
Historical reports suggested that the Palace was once used a residence by the royal family of Travancore. The monument also served as a guest house for the people who used to visit the royal family. The monument is positioned on the banks of the Periyar River. After the death of King Chithira Thirunal Balarama Varma in 1991, the palace was taken over by the state government of Kerala and is taken care of by the government which now serves as a hospitality centre.
