= Iranikulam Sree Mahadeva Temple =

Hindu temple in India

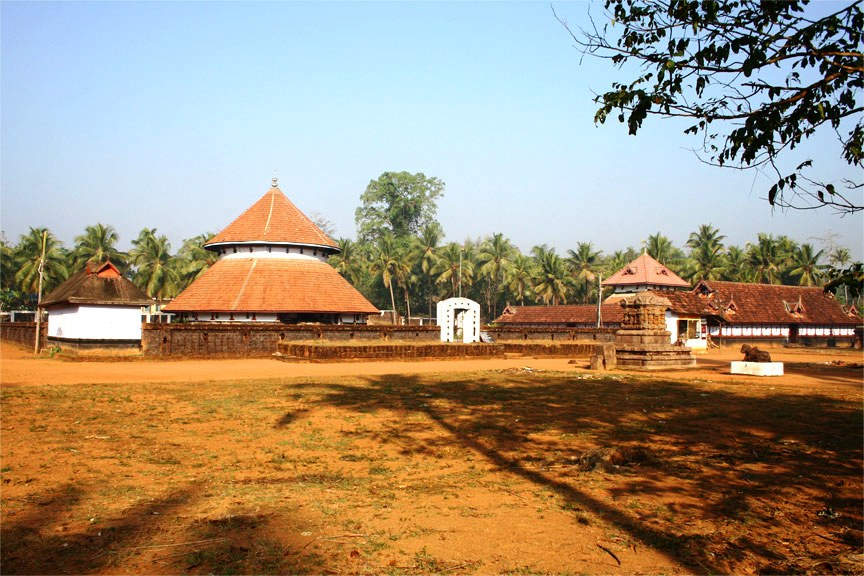

- Sree Mahadeva Temple, Iranikulam, Thrissur, Kerala

Religion
- Affiliation: Hinduism
- District: Thrissur
- Deity: Thekkedathappan, Vadakkedathappan, Parvathi, Subrahmanya
- Festivals: Maha Shivaratri, Thiruvathira

Location
- Location: Iranikulam
- State: Kerala
- Country: India
- Interactive map of Iranikulam Sree Mahadeva Temple
- Coordinates: 10.204553°N 76.276883°E

Architecture
- Type: Kerala style
- Completed: Not known

Specifications
- Temple: Two
- Monument: 2
- Elevation: 38.03 m (125 ft)

Iranikulam Sree Mahadeva Temple is in Iranikulam, Mala in Thrissur district in the Indian state of Kerala. The temple has two main deities, Thekkadathappan and Vadakkedathappan, both versions of Shiva. The south shrine is generally considered to be the shrine of Shiva. The presiding deities of the north shrine are Shiva, Parvati and Subramanya. It is believed that this temple is one of the 108 Shiva temples of Kerala and is installed by sage Parasurama dedicated to Shiva.

== See also ==
- 108 Shiva Temples
- Temples of Kerala
- Iranikulam Temple Website

== Temple Photos ==
Various Photos of Iranikulam Sree Mahadeva Temple

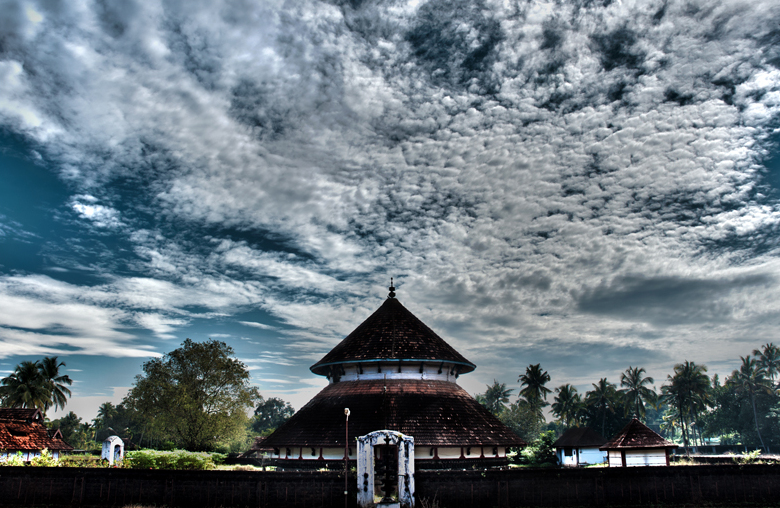
South Sanctum Santorium

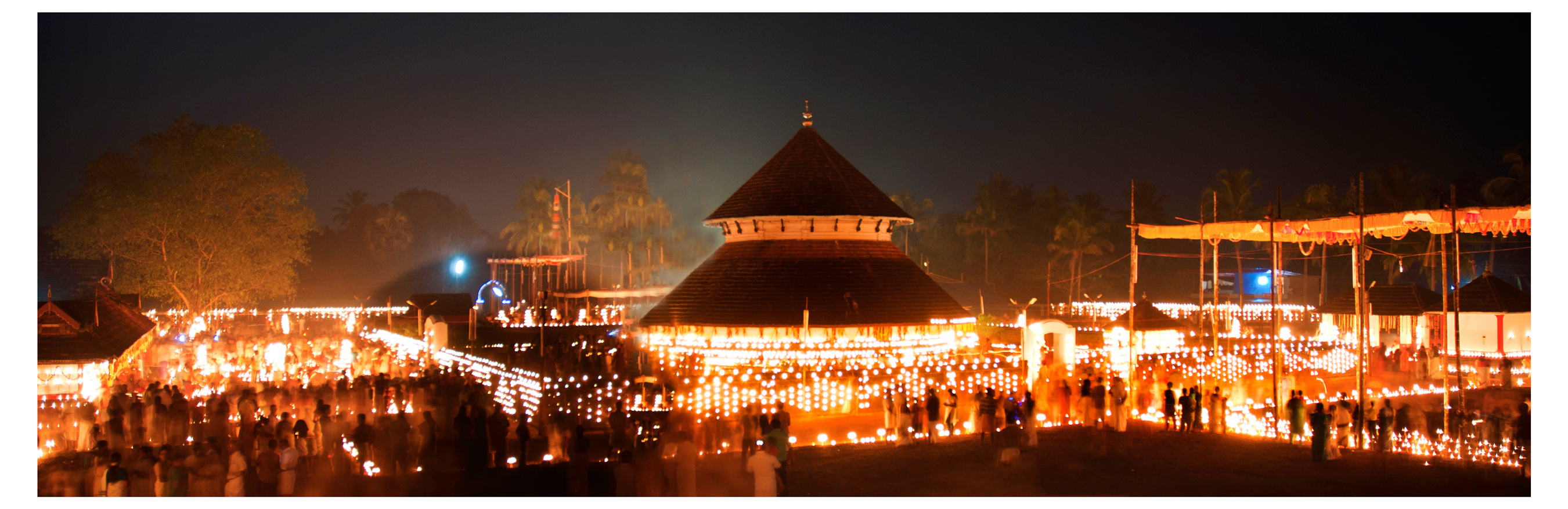
Shivarathri Festival

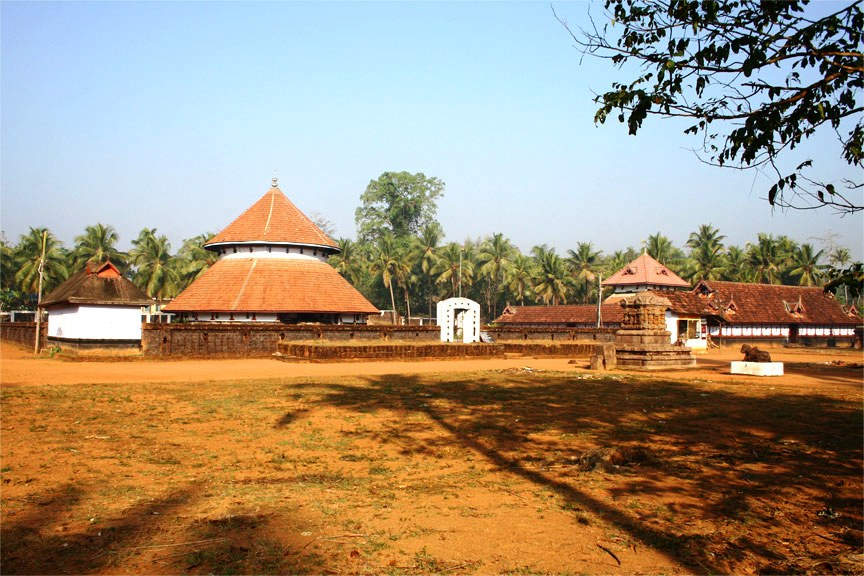
South and North Temple
