= Manu V. Devadevan =

Indian historian

Manu V. Devadevan (born 1977) is an Indian historian known for his works on pre-modern south India. He holds an expertise in multiple Indian languages. He currently works at School of Humanities and Social Sciences, Indian Institute of Technology, Mandi. He has also published two poetry collections in Kannada and is also a translator.

Manu Devadevan, originally from Kerala, grew up and studied in Bengaluru. He completed his post-graduate degree from Jawaharlal Nehru University and completed his doctoral research from Mangalore University (under historian Kesavan Veluthat). The Infosys Prize 2019 for Humanities was awarded to Manu Devadevan.

== Publications ==
- A Pre-History of Hinduism (2016)
- Clio's Descendants: Essays in Honour of Kesavan Veluthat (2018, editor)
- The 'Early Medieval' Origins of India (2020)
- God Is Dead, There Is No God: The Vachanas of Allama Prabhu (2019)
