= M. G. S. Narayanan =

Indian historian and political commentator (1932–2025)

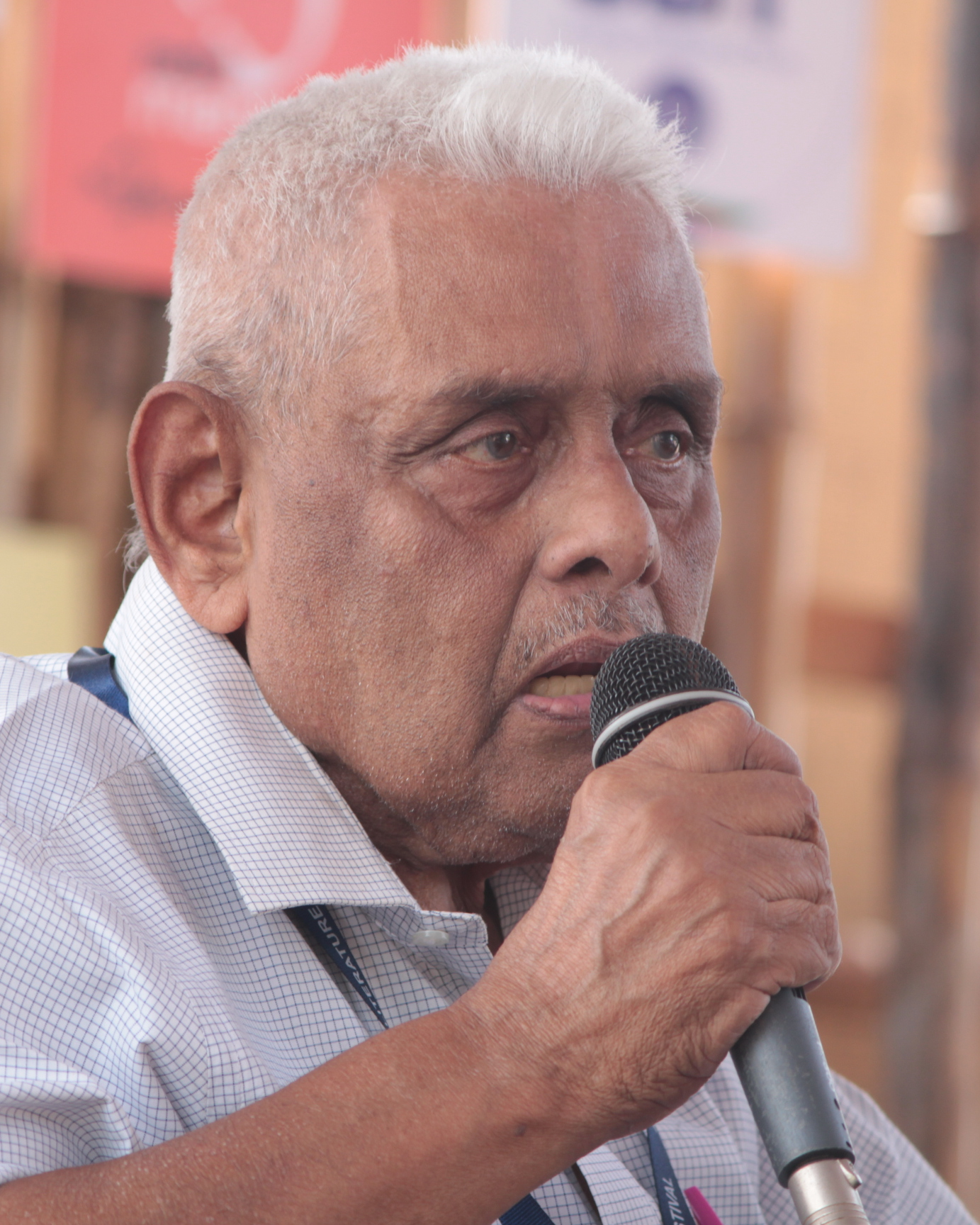
- Narayanan speaking in 2017
- Born: Muttayil Govinda Sankara Narayanan; 20 August 1932; Ponnani, Malabar District, Madras Presidency, British India
- Died: 26 April 2025 (aged 92); Kozhikode, Kerala, India
- Education: Madras Christian College (master's degree); University of Kerala (doctoral studies)
- Occupations: Historian; Academic; Political commentator
- Notable work: Cultural Symbiosis in Kerala (1972); Perumals of Kerala (1972); Calicut: The City of Truth Revisited (2006)

Muttayil Govinda Sankara Narayanan (20 August 1932 – 26 April 2025) was an Indian historian, academic and political commentator. He headed the Department of History at Calicut University (Kerala) from 1976 to 1990, and served as the Chairman (2001–03) of the Indian Council of Historical Research.

== Early life ==
Muttayil Govindamenon Sankara Narayanan was born to Govinda Menon at Ponnani, Malabar district on 20 August 1932.

He had his early education at Parappanangadi, Ponnani, Calicut and Thrissur. He later moved to Madras (present day Chennai) to pursue his master's degree in history from Madras Christian College. Narayanan married Premalatha in August 1965. He was awarded a Ph.D. by the University of Kerala in 1973.

His Ph.D. thesis was published two decades later as Perumals of Kerala in 1996 by Calicut University Press. It empirically reconstructed the history of Kerala during the Ceras between 800 and 1124 CE in a meticulous exercise, states Rajan Gurukkal. His study relies on interpreting inscriptions and the literature from that period. Arthur Llewellyn Basham praised his work as "one of the ablest and most thorough Indian theses I have examined".

== Career ==
M. G. S. Narayanan worked at the Kerala University, University of Calicut and retired in 1992 as Dean of Faculty of Social Sciences and Humanities, a post he held from 1970. He was Professor and Head of the Department of History in Calicut University from 1976 to 1990. He was the general secretary of Indian History Congress during 1982–1985, and a visiting fellow at the Institute of Oriental Studies, Moscow University in 1991. He served as Member-Secretary of the Indian Council of Historical Research during 1990–1992.

Narayanan was known for his Brahmin Oligarchy model and he was one of the many critics of Burton Stein's "segmentary state" model for the Chola Empire. With Veluthat, Narayanan proposed that Bhakti movement brought together "kings, Brahmanas and the common people" in harmony between 6th and 10th-century, but more as an "illusion of equality", writes Karashima. Other scholars have proposed different views, noting certain defects in his model.

According to T. K. Rajalakshmi writing in Frontline in 2001 – a news weekly in India – Narayanan was a specialist in ancient history and "a believer in Hindutva to the extent that he is a Hindu and an inheritor of a great tradition". Though he was close to the Bharatiya Janata Party, states Rajalakshmi, he was not a hardliner. Narayanan stated that "there cannot be history without differences".

Narayanan died on 26 April 2025, at the age of 92.

== See also ==
- K. N. Panikkar
