= Kesavan Veluthat =

Indian historian (born 1951)

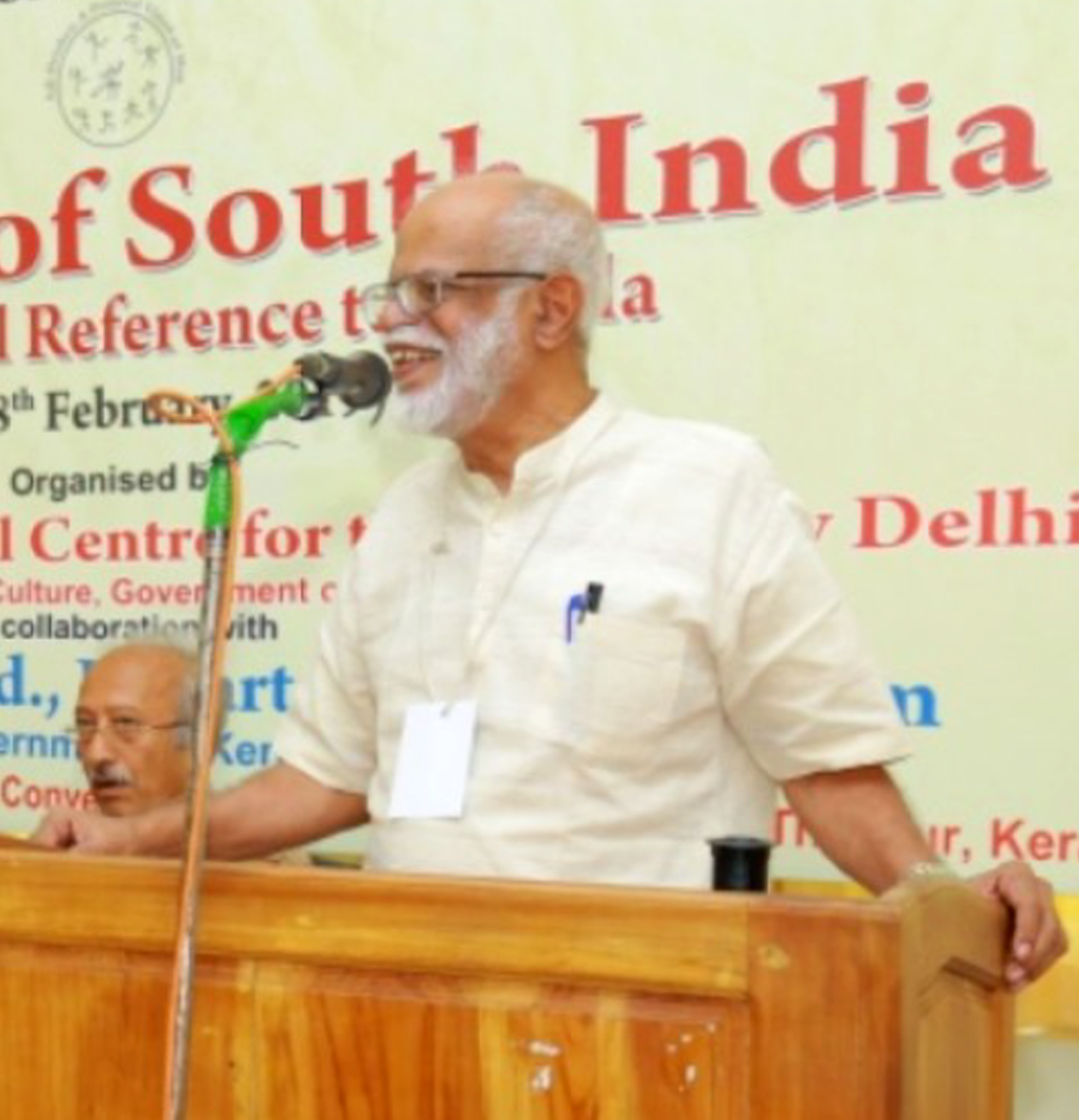
- Kesavan Veluthat
- Education: National Council for Rural Higher Education (undergraduate degree); University of Calicut (Master's Degree and Doctoral Studies); M. Phil from Jawaharlal Nehru University (M. Phil)
- Occupations: Historian; Academic
- Notable work: The Political Structure of Early Medieval South India (1993); The Early Medieval in South India (2009)

Kesavan Veluthat (born 1951) is an Indian historian and academic from Kerala specializing in medieval south Indian history. He is also an epigraphist and knows languages such as Sanskrit, Tamil, Kannada and Malayalam.

== Career ==
Veluthat received his undergraduate degree from National Council for Rural Higher Education, graduate degree from University of Calicut (Kerala) in 1974, M.Phil. from Jawaharlal Nehru University in 1978 and doctoral degree from the University of Calicut in 1987. He was a student of historian M. G. S. Narayanan.

Veluthat started his career as a Kerala government service college teacher in 1975. In 1982 he moved to the newly formed Mangalore University. Veluthat retired as Professor and Chairman of the Department of History in 2008. He also served as professor of history at the Delhi University.

He was a visiting professor at Ecole Pratique des Hautes Etudes, Paris; Maison des Sciences de l’Homme, Paris; Jawaharlal Nehru University, New Delhi; Mahatma Gandhi University, Kerala and University of Hyderabad, Hyderabad. He is a lifetime member of Indian History Congress. He was also associated with the National Assessment and Accreditation Council (NAAC) in assessing universities and colleges in India.

== Major publications ==
The below are some of his major publications:

- Brahman Settlements in Kerala: Historical Studies, (Kozhikode, Sandhya Publications, 1978; revised and enlarged edition, CosmoBooks, Thrissur, 2013)
- Kerala Through the Ages, (Thiruvananthapuram, Department of Public Relations, Government of Kerala, 1976) with M. G. S. Narayanan, et al.
- The Political Structure of Early Medieval South India, (New Delhi, Orient Longman, 1993; second revised edition, New Delhi, Orient Blackswan, 2012)
- State and Society in Pre-modern South India, ed., with R. Champakalakshmi and T. R. Venugopalan (Cosmo Books, Thrisssur, 2002)
- The Early Medieval in South India, Oxford University Press, (New Delhi, 2009; first paperback edition, 2010; sixth edition, 2014)
- Irreverent History: Essays for M. G. S. Narayanan, ed., with Donald R. Davis, Primus Books, Delhi, 2014
