= Ainnurruvar =

Indian medieval merchant guild

Ainnurruvar is a medieval merchant guild originating in the Karnataka region of India between the 8th and 13th centuries. In this period, organised merchant guilds exerted considerable power and influence. Ainnurruvar was one of the most prominent of these guilds. During the Chola Empire they were regarded as the elite amongst the South Indian merchant organizations.

The Five Hundred Lords of Ayyavole were a merchant guild from Aihole that provided trade links between trading communities in Tamil Nadu, Karnataka and Andhra Pradesh. They have been mentioned in inscriptions from the 9th century CE. Aihole was formerly a major city of the Chalukyas of Badami and a place with many temples and brahmins, some of whom seem to have become involved in the trading activities of the Five Hundred. But most of the Ayyavolu Lords were merchants, especially those engaged in long-distance trade. Their inscriptions between the 9th and 14th centuries record their endowments made to temples and throw light on their trading activities or commodities.

The Five Hundred guild, known as Ayyavole in Kannada, Ayyavolu in Telugu, Aryarupa in Sanskrit, and Ainuruvar in Tamil, operated in Southern India and Southeast Asia. They became more powerful under the Cholas. They were protectors of the Veera-Banaju-Dharma, that is, law of the heroic or noble merchants. The Bull was their symbol which they displayed on their flag; and they had a reputation for being daring and enterprising.

== Origins ==
A Tamil inscription of 1088 A.D. found in Sumatra, Indonesia refers to the "Nagara Senapathi Nattu cettiar" as belonging to the Ainnurruvar group. By the twelfth century, the Ainnuruvars' had encompassed other trading guilds to arise as a dominating force. For instance the Manigram Nagarattam states itself to be a subsidiary group.

An inscription in Piranmalai makes references to "cetti"s as "flourishing" and as "being integral to the Tisai Ayirattu Ainnurruvar organization and occupying 18 pattinams, 32 valarpurams (major trade centres) and 64 Kadigai valams. Significantly the number 18 resembles the name of one of the seven geographical divisions (Pathinettu uur vattahai) and 32 plus 64 equate to the legendary count of 96 Villages of the Nattukkottai Chettiars. The Piranmalai inscriptions (13th century) also speak of the Ainnurruvar, the Manigrammam of Kodumbalur (near Pudukkottai) and Nagarathars as far away as from Kerala and Sinhala (Refer the "Kerala Singa Vala Nadu" phrase in Nagarathar marriage settlements (Isaikkudimanam) coming together to donate huge funds for the temple.(The Trading world of the Tamil merchant: Evolution of merchant capitalism in the Coramandal By Kanakalatha Mukund).

The association between the Cholas and the Ainnurruvar has been well established from the number of finds of Ainnurruvar inscriptions. The maximum number of Ainnurruvar inscriptions have occurred during the Chola dynasty that lasted between the 10th and 13th centuries. Most importantly the 1088 inscription of Sumatra (reign of Kulothunga I) and the 1036 A.D.(Rajendra I) inscription in Sri Lanka establish the close association between the Ainnurruvar community and the Cholas beyond doubt.According to Prof.Champakalakshmi, the Ainnurruvar moved in wherever the Cholas had conquered.

There is no clear reference to the end of this guild and there have been some mentions of the tensions between the descendants of this guild and the British Empire. Their total span of existence might have been ten decades.

== Organization ==
The members of this guild were managed by the "Pancha Sata Vira Sasana" or the edict of five hundred. At various times their headquarters was declared to be in neelampur in Erode district.

The Ainnurruvar had their own armies to escort their caravans (The Sri Lankan inscription clearly establishes this) and merchant ships. There are references to a regiment named "Pazhi Ili Ainnurruvar" in the Chola records. While this regiment could have been named after "Pazhi Ili" of the Mutharaiyar clan, the occurrence of the term "Ainnurruvar" is curious. These armies were evidently lent in support of the Chola expeditions. Contrary to the earlier view that the purpose of Rajendra's expedition to South East Asia may have been to plunder, the more recent view which is also supported by available evidence is that the raids were conducted to clear piracy from and to gain control over the sea lanes of the Melakka Straits that served as the gateway to the Far East for the Indian merchant ships. A partly Tamil and partly Chinese inscriptions (1281 A.D.) found in China and other references to the Chola emissaries to the Chinese court and vice versa stand testimony to the significant volumes of trade between the Tamil country and the Far East including China.

The guild taxed its members as a percentage of revenues. This tax had to paid in advance to gain membership. The guild has also been noted to do charity work to develop villages and temples.

== Trade Dynamics ==
According to Anthony Reid (Verandah of Violence – the background to the Aceh problem), there are numerous evidences to Tamil mercantile activities in Aceh, northern Sumatra during the early part of the second millennium. He thinks some of the ships that ferried between Tamilakham and Sumatra could have been salt carrying ships. They were also known to trade in Areca, Iron, Cotton yarn and perhaps even cloth.

They were known to have Marketing relationships with the traders of Sri Lanka and dominated the trade route between South India and Sri Lanka.

== Legacy ==
Kanakalatha Mukund argues that the period from 900 to 1300 set the stage for evolution of trade into corporate and commercial institutions. She says the apprenticeship practices of the Tamil traders mentioned by Marco Polo, the European traveller, resemble those followed by Nattukkottai Chettiars even today.

A Later Chola (reign of Sundara Chola 957-973 A.D) inscription in Pillayar Patti refers to the formation of a "nagaram" named Raja Narayana Puram by the Ainnurruvar community. Pillayarpatti inscriptions also point to Ainnurruva Perun Theru of "En Karikkudi" (Epigraphical Reference 147-150 of 1935–36 – Page 223 Trade and Statecraft in the Ages of Colas by Kenneth R. Hall). According to soe authors this reference is to the present day city of "Karai Kudi".

The present day Nattukottai Chettiars of Tamil Nadu must be the descendants of these "Nattu Cettiar". There are also other indisputable archeological evidences that support this view. The presiding deity of the Mathur Temple (one of the nine of this class that belong to the Nattukkottai Chettiar Community) is named Ainurreeswarar.

The Five Hundred Lords of Ayyavole were a merchant guild from Aihole that provided trade links between trading communities in Tamil Nadu, Karnataka and Andhra Pradesh. They have been mentioned in inscriptions from the 9th century CE. Aihole was formerly a major city of the Chalukyas of Badami and a place with many temples and brahmans, some of whom seem to have become involved in the trading activities of the Five Hundred. But most of the Ayyavolu Lords were merchants, especially those engaged in long-distance trade. Their inscriptions between the 9th and 14th centuries record their endowments made to temples and throw light on their trading activities or commodities.

The Five Hundred guild, known as Ainutruvar in Tamil, Ayyavole in Kannada, Ayyavolu in Telugu and Aryarupa in Sanskrit, operated in Southern India and Southeast Asia. They became more powerful under the Cholas. They were protectors of the Veera-Banaju-Dharma, that is, law of the heroic or noble merchants. The Bull was their symbol which they displayed on their flag; and they had a reputation for being daring and enterprising.

== Description ==
The following passage on the guild of Ayyavolu merchants is taken from an inscription dated 1055 CE and summarises their activities and commodities:

Famed throughout the world, adorned with many good qualities, truth, purity, good conduct, policy, condescension, and prudence; protectors of the vira-Bananju-dharma [law of the heroic traders], having 32 veloma, 18 cities, 64 yoga-pithas, and asramas at the four points of the compass; born to be wanderers over many countries, the earth as their sack,....the serpent race as the cords, the betel pouch as a secret pocket,... by land routes and water routes penetrating into the regions of the six continents, with superior elephants, well-bred horses, large sapphires, moonstones, pearls, rubies, diamonds,...cardamoms, cloves, sandal, camphor, musk, saffron and other perfumes and drugs, by selling which wholesale or hawking about on their shoulders, preventing the loss by customs duties, they fill up the emperor's treasury of gold, his treasury of jewels, and his armoury of weapons; and from the rest they daily bestow gifts on pundits and munis; white umbrellas as their canopy, the mighty ocean as their moat, Indra as the hand-guard of their swords, Varuna as the standard bearer, Kubera as the treasurer,...

== Origin and activities ==
The Five Hundred were an itinerant group that became a community because of their operations. In comparison to other guilds, they were considered the most flamboyant. Together with another guild of merchants called Manigramam, the guild of Five Hundred were found in ports and commercial centres. They endowed temples, fed Brahmans, and contributed to the maintenance of irrigation works. Their inscriptions dot the entire southern peninsula, tracing an inter-regional and international network of merchants. Some of these merchants were called "nanadesi" (or "of many countries), while some were called "swadesi" (or "of own country"). These traders were one of the conduits for transporting Indian culture to Southeast Asia.

Evidences show that the erection of temples and mathas depended upon royal patronage and mercantile guilds like Ayyavolu, Nakaramu and Komatis who supported temple building activity. Similarly temple building activity also depended upon guilds of architects or the Acharyas of the Vishwakarma-Kula who also seem to have organised themselves into guilds based on geographical divisions.

=== Veera-Balanjas ===
The lords of Ayyavolu were called Vira-Balanjas. The term Vira-Balanja in Kannada and Vira-Valanjiyar in Tamil, Vira-Balija in Telugu, all of them mean "valiant merchants". These merchants styled themselves as protectors of Vira Balanja Dharma (Vira Balanja Dharma Pratipalanulu) and often figured in the inscriptions of medieval Andhra. There are several epigraphs available on the Veera-Balanjas. One example is an epigraph of 1531 CE from the Anilama village of Cuddapah, which refers to the grant of certain toll-income (Magama) on articles of trade, such as cotton, yarn, cloth, etc., made by the Veera-Balanja merchant guild of Ayyavolu, for the lamp-offerings of God Sangamesvara of that village.

Copper-plate inscriptions of Nellore mention that the organisation of Ayyavola, or Ayyavola-enumbaru-swamigalu were the protectors of the Vira-Balanja dharma (aka Vira-Bananja dharma) and followed the Vira-Banaja-Samaya. According to an inscription dated 1240 CE found at Chintapalli in Guntur district, the Vira-Balanja Samaya (a trade corporation) consisted of Ubhayananadesis, the Gavara, and the Mumuridandas; and they were the recipients of five hundred hero edicts. Of these, the Ubhayananadesis were a unit of merchants derived from all quarters and countries, consisting of Desis, Paradesis and Nanadesis, while the Gavares derived their name as a body of merchants worshipping God Gavaresvara.

Some trade guilds were based on religious identities, such as the Nakaras (a guild) which was a body of Vaisya devotees of Nakaresvara and the Gavares which was a body of Balija devotees of Gavaresvara (Sri Gavaresvara divya deva sripada padmaradhakulu). The Mummuridandas were warriors first and merchants next. An inscription of 1177 AD from Kurugodu, Bellary explicitly states that the Mummuridandas were an offshoot of the 'Five Hundred' who were eminent in Aryapura, that is, Aihole or Ayyavole (srimad aryya nama pura mukhyabhutar enip ainurvarind adavid anvay ayatar). Trade corporations like Vira-Balanja-Samaya flourished under various empires despite wars and invasions.

=== Gavara ===
The Gavaras were a trading community and members of the Ayyavole guild. They worshipped the god Gavaresvara. Kannada inscriptional evidence from Kolhapur (1136 AD) and Miraj (1142–1144 AD) states that the Gavaras were the lords of Ayyavole. Specifically, the Miraj inscription records that Gavara chiefs were represented in the Vira Balanja syndicate of Sedambal. This is further supported by a 1240 AD inscription from Chintapalli in the Guntur district, which is written in Kannada with a mixture of Telugu expressions and notes that the Gavaras were protectors of the Vira Balanja Dharma.

== In Tamil sources ==
A fragmentary Chera inscription datable to 1000 CE in the reign of Bhaskara Ravi, found on three broken stones in a mosque in Pandalayini-Kollam (near Kozhikode), refers to Valanjiyar and other merchants found in the assembly of Ayyavole-500 trade guild. The Ayyavole-500 were simply called Ainuruvar in Tamil.

In Visakhapatnam, three inscriptions were found, two in Telugu and one in Tamil. They were on the Ainuttava-perumballi (500 perumballi) in Visakhapatnam and dated to 1090 CE under the reign of the Ganga king Anantavarmadeva. Another Telugu inscription records a similar grant to the same Ainuttava-Perumballi by the Chief Mahamandaleshvara Kulotungga Prithvisvara. The inscriptions suggest that the Anjuvannam people were patronized by the Ayyavole-500 guild and even treated as members of that guild.

It would seem that when the Ayyavole-500 guild became a big overreaching guild of Southern India, most of the existing indigenous and local trade guilds became associated with it. The Manigramam and nanadesi guilds joined the Ayyavole-500. Due to the various Chola naval expeditions to Southeast Asia and the support provided by the Cholas to the Ayyavole guild, the Ayyavole guild emerged as a maritime power and continued to flourish in the kingdom of Srivijaya (a dominant thalassocratic city-state based on the island of Sumatra, Indonesia). This is well documented in an inscription of the Ayyavole guild of the year 1088 AD found in Barus of West Sumatra, Indonesia. South Indian merchants were also active in Burma and the Thai peninsula.

== See also ==
- Trade Guilds of South India
- Anjuvannam
- Manigramam
- Five Hundred Lords of Ayyavolu
- Valanjiyar
- Greater India
- History of Indian influence on Southeast Asia
