= Merchant guild =

Type of guild

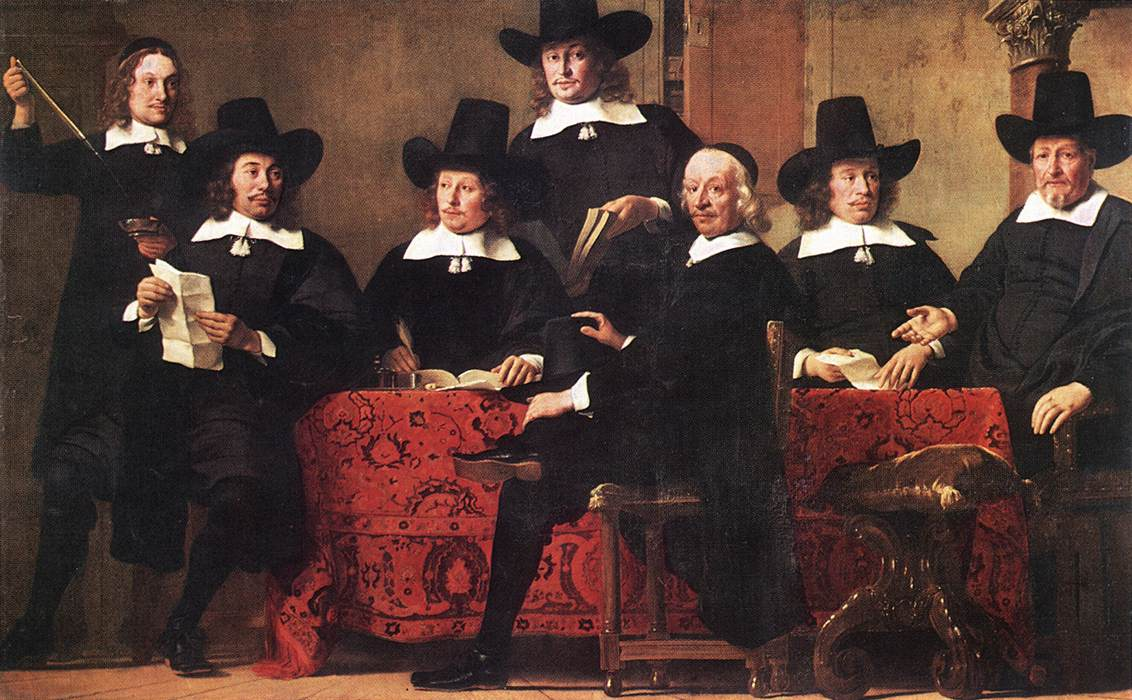
Governors of the Wine Merchant's Guild by Ferdinand Bol, Alte Pinakothek, Munich

A merchant guild was a guild of merchants that were involved in either international or regional trade.

Merchant guilds began to form during the medieval period. A fraternity formed by the merchants of Tiel in Gelderland (in present-day Netherlands) in 1020 is believed to be the first example of a merchant guild. The term, guild was first used for gilda mercatoria and referred to body of merchants operating out of St. Omer, France in the 11th century. These guilds controlled the way that trade was to be conducted and codified rules governing the conditions of trade.

In the early 12th century, a confederation of merchant guilds, formed out of the German cities of Lübeck and Hamburg, known as the Hanseatic League came to dominate trade around the Baltic Sea. London's Hanse was formed in the 12th century as one of the best known guilds of merchants from different cities.

By the 13th and 14th centuries, merchant guilds had sufficient resources to have erected guild halls in many major market towns.

Rules established by merchant guilds were often incorporated into the municipal charters granted to market towns, with incorporated societies of merchants in each town or city holding exclusive rights of doing business there. In many cases they became the governing body of a town. An example is the medieval English Gild Merchant. In some medieval English towns, the gild merchant functioned as part of town administration and helped regulate the local trade monopoly.

== Russian Empire ==
During the Kievan Rus', merchants were referred to one of three names based on the scale of their operation: the international or foreign trading gosti (literally, guests), the local merchant kuptsy, and the small commodity dealing torgovtsy. By the end of the 16th century, the gosti were integrated into the Muscovite hierarchy as heads of large corporations with certain obligations owed to and privileges extracted from the tsar with regional and local trade operating outside the capital conducted by the gostinnaya sotnya (lit. guests' hundred) and the sukonnaya sotnya (mercer's hundred) respectively.

From the reforms of Peter the Great at the beginning of the 18th century until the Decree on the Abolition of Estates, these divisions were organized hierarchically into three classes registered with the state for a fee and enjoining privileges to trade in certain areas and goods. Membership was exclusive to men and was not automatically hereditarily conferred; relatives were afforded special recognition to conduct business on the behalf of the guild member until their death with adult male children having to earn their own membership. The Manifesto of March 17, 1775 further defined capital requirements for each rank.

== Examples outside Europe ==
=== China ===
- Ten Great Merchant Guilds
- Cohong

=== India ===
- Ainnurruvar
- Anjuvannam
- Shreni
- Trade Guilds of South India

=== Japan ===
- Za (guilds)
- Kabunakama

=== Pre-Columban America ===
- Pochteca

== See also ==
- Company of Merchant Adventurers
- Company of Merchant Adventurers of London
- Company of Merchant Adventurers to New Lands
