= Trade guilds of South India =

Southern Indian trade guilds were formed by merchants in order to organise and expand their trading activities. Trade guilds became channels through which Indian culture was exported to other lands. From the 11th century to the 13th century, South Indian trade in Southeast-Asia was dominated by the Cholas; and it replaced the Pallava influence of the previous centuries.

== Early guilds ==
Before the rise of the Cholas, inscriptions from Java, Indonesia, mention only the Kalingas as foreign visitors from the eastern coast of India. In 1021 CE an inscription added Dravidas to the list of maritime powers, and they were then replaced by the Colikas (Cholas), in the year 1053 AD. The Kalinga traders (of modern Southern Odisha and Northern Andhra) brought red coloured stone decorative objects for trade. Kalinga was also an important source of cotton textiles to Southeast Asia at an early date. In the Tamil Sangam classic, Chirupanattuppadai (line 96), there is a mention of blue Kalingam. Fine garments of high quality cotton imported from Kalinga country into the Tamil country were called Kalingam, which shows that Kalinga was an exporter of cotton at an early date.

== Description ==
Several trade guilds operated in medieval Southern India such as the Gatrigas, Nagarathar, Mummuridandas, Ayyavolu-500, Ubhayananadesigal, Settis, Settiguttas, Birudas, Biravaniges, Kavarai, etc. Temples were the pivot around which socio-economic activities of the land revolved. Some trade guilds, such as the Nagarathar and Kavarai, met only in the temple premises.

Some trade guilds were very powerful and decided the fortunes of the kingdom. One example is the trade guild of Nanadeshis who not only financed local development projects and temple-constructions but also lent money to the kings. The rulers did their best to accommodate the guilds because of the benefit they derived from them. Trade guilds employed troops, enjoyed immunities, and had international connections and thus constituted a state within a state.

Trade guilds were often independent bodies over which kings tried to exercise control; and sometimes failed. One such example relates to the bankers and money-changers of the Bahmani Kingdom who ignored all warnings and melted all new coins that fell into their hands and supplied the metal to the mints of Warangal and Vijayanagar.

== Guild names ==
Some trade guilds are listed below.

- Five Hundred Lords of Ayyavolu: also known as Ayyavole, Ainnurruvar, Vira Balanju, vira banajigaru, vira balanjya, vira Valanjiyar, vira balija, Nanadesi, etc. They were a group of 500 Swamis who constituted themselves into a board of merchants in Aihole.
- The Anjuvannam guild: consisting of Jewish, Christian and Muslim traders operating in the ports of Malabar, Coromandal Coast and Java. This guild was defined by Y.Subbarayalu as a "body of west Asian traders". A Syrian Christian grant of 1220 AD bears signatures in Arabic, Hebrew and Pahlavi scripts, while a Tamil text refers to Muslim Anjuvannam traders in Nagapattinam. In a 1296 AD epigraphy of Tittandatanapuram, the Anjuvannam guild finds mention in a big assembly of several merchants and weavers including Manigramam and Valanjiyar of south Ilangai (Sri Lanka) indicating that it had an influential position in that settlement. The merchants of Anjuvannam guild of Manigramam (of Kerala) were called Vanigar and were found along with the Nadu, Nagara, and various itinerant merchants (Samasta-Paradesi) of the 18-bhumi. They find mention in 1279 AD making some contribution to a local temple on the merchandise imported and exported at a local port (Nellore Inscriptions, I, Gudur 45).
- The Nanadesi guild: were a group of various merchants. They find mention in the 14th century Tamil inscription recording the assurance of fair treatment by a local chief named Annapota Reddi. The Nanadesi guild and the Manigramam guild later joined the Ayyavole-500 guild.
- Sankarappadi guild and Saliya Nagarattar guild: were specialised merchant guilds that functioned in urban centres.
- Manigramam guild: flourished in Tamil Nadu in the Pallava and Chola periods and was active in South-east Asia.
- Nakara guild: also known as Nagara and Nakaramu. They were a body of Vaishya devotees of Nakaresvara. Penugonda of Andhra-desa was their headquarters. They were known as Nagara swamis or Nakarasvamulu. The word is found in Kannada inscriptions as Nakara and Nakhara, cf, as also Nagarathar, Nagarasvamin and Nagaravaru in other languages. The Nagarathars were a local guild of the Ainurruvar.
- Gavara The Gavaras were a trading community and members of the Ayyavole guild. They worshipped the god Gavaresvara. Kannada inscriptional evidence from Kolhapur (1136 AD) and Miraj (1142–1144 AD) states that the Gavaras were the lords of Ayyavole. Specifically, the Miraj inscription records that Gavara chiefs were represented in the Vira Balanja syndicate of Sedambal. This is further supported by a 1240 AD inscription from Chintapalli in the Guntur district, which is written in Kannada with a mixture of Telugu expressions and notes that the Gavaras were protectors of the Vira Balanja Dharma.
- Mummuridandas: they were originally mercenary troops who protected the prabhumukhyalu (chiefs) of different pekkandru guilds. They were hired by traders to ensure protection of itinerant groups and caravans, and also to ensure safety of trading settlements. They were warriors first and merchants next and had branched off from the Ayyavole-500 guild.

== See also ==
- Company of Merchant Adventurers of London
- Company of Merchant Adventurers to New Lands
- Germania (guild)
- Guild
- Guildhall Museum
- Hanseatic League
- Marketplace
- Merchant
- Retail
- Society of Merchant Venturers
