= Khadana, Bulandshahr =

Khadana
- village
- Location in Uttar Pradesh, India Khadana (India)
- Coordinates: 28.4080°N 77.8559°E
- Country: India
- State: Uttar Pradesh
- District: Bulandshahr
- Tehsil: Anupshahr

Government
  - Body: Gram panchayat

Population (2011)
  - Total: 3,999

Languages
  - Official: Hindi
- Time zone: IST, (UTC+5:30)
- Vehicle registration: UP
- Sex ratio: ♂/♀
- Website: up.gov.in

Khadana is a village panchayat in Anupshahr Tehsil in the district of Bulandshahr in the Indian state of Uttar Pradesh. Its first language is Hindi. It is located 7 km from Jhangirabad on the road to Aahar. In the 2011 census, the village had a population of 3,999
