= Viraraghava copper plate =

Concessions made by the king of Cranganore to a Syrian Christian merchant

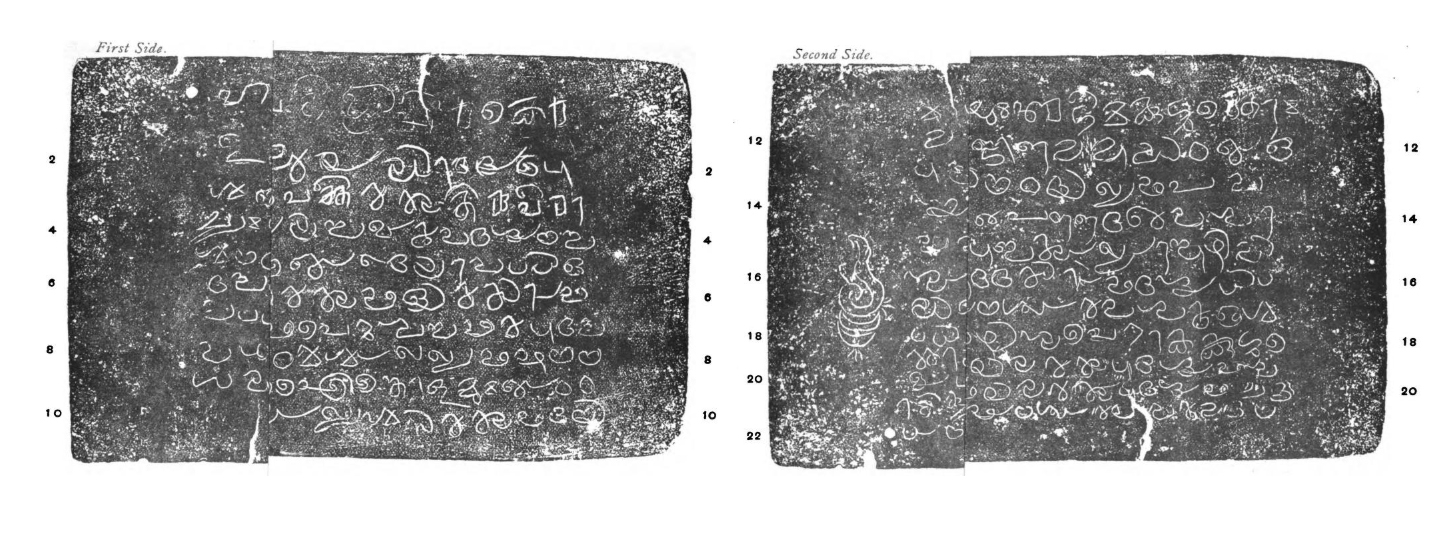
- Viraraghava copper plate
- Material: Copper
- Writing: Early Malayalam
- Created: c. 1225 CE; Kerala
- Present location: Kottayam

Viraraghava copper plate (c. 1225 CE) is a medieval Vattezhuthu inscription from central Kerala, southern India, describing the several concessions made by Viraraghava, the ruler of "Makotaiyar Pattinam" (the port of Kodungallur), to Syrian Christian merchant Iravikorttan, who was the leader of Manigramam at the time of receiving these concessions.

The provisions include the Title of Cheraman Loka Maha Perum Chetty, multiple commercial rights and princely privileges, such as "the Rights of the Manigramam Merchant Guild", Sovereignty and tax free status over port city of Makottiyarpattinam, various monopolies, article brokerages and the right to use slave labour. The record is currently in possession of the Syrian Christian community in Kottayam.

== Names ==
The Viraraghava copper plate is often called "Viraraghava copper plate of Cochin". It is also registered as "Kottayam plate of Viraraghava Chakravartin", or simply as the "Syrian Christian copper plate", or the "Iravi Kortann's Plate".

== Context ==
The record is engraved on both sides of a single copper-plate in the Vattezhuthu script and a modified form of the Grantha script (22 lines). An image of a conch is engraved about the middle of the left margin of the reverse side of the plate. It is dated to the day of the "Rohini star, a Saturday after the expiration of the twenty-first day of the Solar month of Mina of the year during which the Jupiter was in Makara".

Manigiramam, along with Anjuvannam and Ainurruvar, was one of major merchant guilds in medieval south India.

- Viraraghava "Chakravarti" [sovereign ruler] is described as the descendant of certain Vira Kerala "Chakravarti".
- The grant was issued from the Great Palace ("the Perum Koyilakam") at Makotaiyar Pattinam.
- Iravikorttan of "Makotaiyar Pattinam" is described as "the Great Merchant of the Chera/Kerala Land" and the "Lord of the City" ("Nagarattukku Karttavu").
- The Four Temples (the Nalu Tali) are mentioned.
- Witnesses mentioned
  - Panniyur Village and Sukapuram Village.
  - Venad, Odanadu, Eranad and Valluvanad.
- The scribe is named - Nampi Chateyan, "the Great Goldsmith of the Chera Land".

== Rights and privileges ==
Source: Venkayya, V. Hultzsch, E. (ed.). "Kottayam Plate of Vira-Raghava". Epigraphica Indica (1896-97). 4. Archaeological Survey of India: 290–97.

Insignia from Viraraghava copper plate

=== Commercial Rights ===
- Rights of the Manigramam Guild.
- The income that accrues.
- The export trade (?) and the monopoly of trade.
- Monopoly of trade in the four quarters ("the Nalu Cheri").
- Slaves (oilmongers [the Vaniya] and the five classes of artisans [the Kammala]).
- Brokerage on articles that may be, measured with the para, weighed by the balance (nira), measured with the thread, counted or weighed and all other articles that intermediate, including salt, sugar, musk ("kasturi") and lamp oil.
- Customs levied on these articles between the [Periyar] river mouth ("azhi") of Kodungallur and the gate ("gopura"), chiefly between the four temples ("the Nalu Tali") and the village adjacent to each temple.

=== Princely privileges ===
- The right to construct a gateway with ornamental arch and house pillars.
- The right to wear Royal Diadem (Veerapatta)
- The right to issue proclamations.
- The right to use a palanquin and the royal parasol.
- The right to use the "vaduga" drum.
- the right to employ forerunners.
- The right to employ the five musical instruments ("the pancha vadya")
- The right to employ a conch and to use day-time lamp.
- The right to use a cloth spread in front to walk on.
- The right to use festive clothing.
