= Five Hundred Lords of Ayyavole =

Medieval Indian merchant guild

The Five Hundred Lords of Ayyavole were a merchant guild from Aihole that provided trade links between trading communities in Karnataka, Andhra Pradesh and Tamil Nadu. They have been mentioned in inscriptions from the 9th century CE. Aihole was formerly a major city of the Chalukyas of Badami and a place with many temples and brahmans, some of whom seem to have become involved in the trading activities of the Five Hundred. But most of the Ayyavole Lords were merchants, especially those engaged in long-distance trade. Their inscriptions between the 9th and 14th centuries record their endowments made to temples and throw light on their trading activities or commodities.

The Five Hundred guild, known as Ayyavole in Kannada, Ayyavolu in Telugu, Aryarupa in Sanskrit, and Ainuruvar in Tamil, operated in Southern India and Southeast Asia. They became more powerful under the Cholas. They were protectors of the Veera-Banaju-Dharma, that is, law of the heroic or noble merchants. The Bull was their symbol which they displayed on their flag; and they had a reputation for being daring and enterprising.

== Description ==
The following passage on the guild of Ayyavole merchants is taken from an inscription dated 1055 CE and summarises their activities and commodities:

Famed throughout the world, adorned with many good qualities, truth, purity, good conduct, policy, condescension, and prudence; protectors of the vira-Bananju-dharma [law of the heroic traders], having 32 veloma, 18 cities, 64 yoga-pithas, and asramas at the four points of the compass; born to be wanderers over many countries, the earth as their sack,....the serpent race as the cords, the betel pouch as a secret pocket,... by land routes and water routes penetrating into the regions of the six continents, with superior elephants, well-bred horses, large sapphires, moonstones, pearls, rubies, diamonds,...cardamoms, cloves, sandal, camphor, musk, saffron and other perfumes and drugs, by selling which wholesale or hawking about on their shoulders, preventing the loss by customs duties, they fill up the emperor's treasury of gold, his treasury of jewels, and his armoury of weapons; and from the rest they daily bestow gifts on pundits and munis; white umbrellas as their canopy, the mighty ocean as their moat, Indra as the hand-guard of their swords, Varuna as the standard bearer, Kubera as the treasurer,...

== Origin and activities ==
The Five Hundred were an itinerant group that became a community because of their operations. In comparison to other guilds, they were considered the most flamboyant. Together with another guild of merchants called Manigramam, the guild of Five Hundred were found in ports and commercial centres. They endowed temples, fed Brahmans, and contributed to the maintenance of irrigation works. Their inscriptions dot the entire southern peninsula, tracing an inter-regional and international network of merchants. Some of these merchants were called "nanadesi" (or "of many countries), while some were called "swadesi" (or "of own country"). These traders were one of the conduits for transporting Indian culture to Southeast Asia.

Evidences show that the erection of temples and mathas depended upon royal patronage and mercantile guilds like Ayyavole and Nakaramu who supported temple building activity. Similarly temple building activity also depended upon guilds of architects or the Acharyas of the Vishwakarma-Kula who also seem to have organised themselves into guilds based on geographical divisions.

=== Veera-Balanjas ===
The lords of Ayyavolu were called Vira-Balanjas. The term Vira-Balanja in Kannada and Vira-Valanjiyar in Tamil, Vira-Balija in Telugu, all of them mean "valiant merchants". These merchants styled themselves as protectors of Vira Balanja Dharma (Vira Balanja Dharma Pratipalanulu) and often figured in the inscriptions of medieval Andhra. There are several epigraphs available on the Veera-Balanjas. One example is an epigraph of 1531 CE from the Anilama village of Cuddapah, which refers to the grant of certain toll-income (Magama) on articles of trade, such as cotton, yarn, cloth, etc., made by the Veera-Balanja merchant guild of Ayyavolu, for the lamp-offerings of God Sangamesvara of that village.

Copper-plate inscriptions of Nellore mention that the organisation of Ayyavola, or Ayyavola-enumbaru-swamigalu were the protectors of the Vira-Balanja dharma (aka Vira-Bananja dharma) and followed the Vira-Banaja-Samaya. According to an inscription dated 1240 CE found at Chintapalli in Guntur district, the Vira-Balanja Samaya (a trade corporation) consisted of Ubhayananadesis, the Gavara, and the Mumuridandas; and they were the recipients of five hundred hero edicts. Of these, the Ubhayananadesis were a unit of merchants derived from all quarters and countries, consisting of Desis, Paradesis and Nanadesis, while the Gavares derived their name as a body of merchants worshipping God Gavaresvara.

Some trade guilds were based on religious identities, such as the Nakaras (a guild) which was a body of Vaisya devotees of Nakaresvara and the Gavares which was a body of Balija devotees of Gavaresvara (Sri Gavaresvara divya deva sripada padmaradhakulu). The Mummuridandas were warriors first and merchants next. An inscription of 1177 AD from Kurugodu, Bellary explicitly states that the Mummuridandas were an offshoot of the 'Five Hundred' who were eminent in Aryapura, that is, Aihole or Ayyavole (srimad aryya nama pura mukhyabhutar enip ainurvarind adavid anvay ayatar). Trade corporations like Vira-Balanja-Samaya flourished under various empires despite wars and invasions.

=== Gavara ===
The Gavaras were a trading community and members of the Ayyavole guild. They worshipped the god Gavaresvara. Kannada inscriptional evidence from Kolhapur (1136 AD) and Miraj (1142–1144 AD) states that the Gavaras were the lords of Ayyavole. Specifically, the Miraj inscription records that Gavara chiefs were represented in the Vira Balanja syndicate of Sedambal. This is further supported by a 1240 AD inscription from Chintapalli in the Guntur district, which is written in Kannada with a mixture of Telugu expressions and notes that the Gavaras were protectors of the Vira Balanja Dharma.

=== Tamil sources ===
A fragmentary Chera inscription datable to 1000 CE in the reign of Bhaskara Ravi, found on three broken stones in a mosque in Pandalayini-Kollam (near Kozhikode), refers to Valanjiyar and other merchants found in the assembly of Ayyavole-500 trade guild. The Ayyavole-500 were simply called Ainuruvar in Tamil.

In Visakhapatnam, three inscriptions were found, two in Telugu and one in Tamil. They were on the Ainuttava-perumballi (500 perumballi) in Visakhapatnam and dated to 1090 CE under the reign of the Ganga king Anantavarmadeva. Another Telugu inscription records a similar grant to the same Ainuttava-Perumballi by the Chief Mahamandaleshvara Kulotungga Prithvisvara. The inscriptions suggest that the Anjuvannam people were patronized by the Ayyavole-500 guild and even treated as members of that guild.

It would seem that when the Ayyavole-500 guild became a big overreaching guild of Southern India, most of the existing indigenous and local trade guilds became associated with it. The Manigramam and nanadesi guilds joined the Ayyavole-500. Due to the various Chola naval expeditions to Southeast Asia and the support provided by the Cholas to the Ayyavole guild, the Ayyavole guild emerged as a maritime power and continued to flourish in the kingdom of Srivijaya (a dominant thalassocratic city-state based on the island of Sumatra, Indonesia). This is well documented in an inscription of the Ayyavole guild of the year 1088 AD found in Barus of West Sumatra, Indonesia. South Indian merchants were also active in Burma and the Thai peninsula.

== See also ==
- Trade Guilds of South India
- Anjuvannam
- Manigramam
