= Gavara =

Indian community

Gavara is a term used to refer to four distinct and completely unrelated communities in South India.

- Gavara is a trading community and is a sub-caste of Balija. They have marriage relationship with the Balijas. They are present in Tamil Nadu. Kavarai is the Tamil name for Balijas who have settled in Tamil Nadu and is the Tamilised rendition of Gavara. The often use the title Naidu and Chetti. The Telugu-speaking Gavara community of Tamil Nadu is related to Balijas. Gavara Balijas are distinct from both Gavara Komatis and the Gavara caste of former Visakhapatnam district, Andhra Pradesh.
- Gavara is also the name of a Komati sub-caste. They are a trading community. Gavara Komatis are distinct from Gavara-Balijas as well as the Gavara caste of former Visakhapatnam district.
- Alternatively, Gavara is also the name of a small caste mostly present in former Visakhapatnam district (present-day Anakapalli and Visakhapatnam districts) and in some parts of the former Godavari districts of Andhra Pradesh. They are not related to Gavara Balija caste. They are predominantly agriculturists and are also involved in petty trade.
- Kavara (also known as Gavara) is a Tulu speaking caste mostly present in Ernakulam, Palakkad and Thrissur districts of Kerala. They are classified as a Scheduled Caste in Kerala and Tamil Nadu. They are not related to Gavara Balija caste.

== History ==
=== Origins ===
Epigraphic evidence indicates that the Gavaras migrated from Ahichchhatra, located in modern-day Uttar Pradesh, to settle across South India, including Andhra Pradesh, Karnataka, and Tamil Nadu. Linguistic remnants of this migration persist in the exonym seema nepalam, a ridicule term applied to the community by neighboring castes. This phrase recalls a period when Gavara ancestors occupied territory adjacent to Nepal, suggesting that the borders of ancient Ahichchhatra may have extended into the Nepalese Terai. Additionally, historical evidence suggests that a segment of the Gavara population originated from eastern India, particularly Bengal.

=== Medieval History ===
The Gavaras were a trading community and members of the Ayyavole guild. They worshipped the god Gavaresvara. Kannada inscriptional evidence from Kolhapur (1136 AD) and Miraj (1142–1144 AD) states that the Gavaras were the lords of Ayyavole. Specifically, the Miraj inscription records that Gavara chiefs were represented in the Vira Balanja syndicate of Sedambal. This is further supported by a 1240 AD inscription from Chintapalli in the Guntur district, which is written in Kannada with a mixture of Telugu expressions and notes that the Gavaras were protectors of the Vira Balanja Dharma. Historian Kolluru Suryanarayana notes that, during the medieval era, the Gavaras resembled the Vira Balanja community in both character and profession. The Vira Balanja is known as Vira balija in Telugu, Vira Banajiga in Kannada, and Vira Valanjiyar in Tamil, all of them mean valiant merchants. Their capital was Ayyavole, modern-day Aihole in the Bagalkot district of Karnataka.

== Dynasties ==
Some Gavara families were appointed to supervise provinces as Nayaks (governors, commanders) by the Vijayanagara kings, some of which are:

=== Madurai Nayaks ===
Historian Kolluru Suryanarayana notes a strong belief within the Gavara community that the Madurai Nayaks belonged to their community. This belief is supported by epigraphical evidence. The Dalavay Agraharam Plates of Venkata I record that the Madurai ruler Virappa Nayaka held the title Lord of Ayyavalipura (Lords of Ayyavole). This is a traditional title of the Gavara community and denotes that the Madurai Nayaks were protectors of the Vira Balanja Dharma.

=== Thanjavur Nayaks ===
Based on historical inscriptions, archaeologist Kudavayil Balasubramanian identified the Thanjavur Nayaks as belonging to the Kavarai community. Specifically, a 1556 A.D. inscription at the Tiruvannamalai Temple records Timmappa Nayaka as a member of the Kavarai community; Balasubramanian identified this Timmappa Nayaka as the father of Sevappa Nayaka, who ruled Thanjavur.

=== Gingee Nayaks ===
According to records in the Annual Report on South-Indian Epigraphy (1934–35), an inscription dated A.D. 1568 at the Veerapandi Kari Varadaraja Perumal Temple in Thirukovilur notes that Krishnappa Nayaka, the founder of the Gingee dynasty, belonged to the Kavarai community. Furthermore, the Tamil Jains Kaifiyat states that the Gingee ruler, Venkatapati Nayaka, was also from the Kavarai community.

== Notable people ==
=== Personalities from Tamil Nadu ===
- Vijayakanth, actor and politician
- Dhanush, actor
- Parthiban, actor
- Mann Vasanai Pandiyan, actor
- S. Keerthana, Minister for Industries
- M. Vijay Balaji, Minister for Textiles
- E. V. Velu, Former Minister for PWD
- K. Pitchandi, Former Minister for Housing
- Trichy R. Soundararajan, Former Minister for Health
- D. Janardhanan, Former Minister for Milk and Animal Husbandry
- G. Lakshmanan, Former Deputy Speaker of the Lok Sabha
- Pattukkottai Alagiri, social reformer

=== Personalities from Andhra Pradesh ===
- S. R. A. S. Appala Naidu, Former Minister for Fisheries and Ports
- Dadi Veerabhadra Rao, Former Minister for Information & Public Relations
- Konathala Ramakrishna, Former Minister for Commercial Taxes
- Appala Narasimham, Former M.P. for Anakapalle
- Beesetti Venkata Satyavathi, Former M.P. for Anakapalle
