= Shreni =

Guilds of early indian economy

In ancient India, a shreni (Sanskrit: श्रेणि, romanized: śreṇi or श्रेणी śreṇī, Prakrit: seni) was an association of traders, merchants, or artisans and craftspersons in ancient and early medieval India. Typically, a separate shreni existed for a particular group of persons engaged in the same vocation or activity. It functioned as an economic body, largely a self-governed community, and—within limits—a tribunal of first instance for its members. Shrenis are commonly translated to English as "guilds", though scholars caution that the comparison with the merchant and craft guilds of medieval Europe is incorrect.

Well-documented references to the existence of such associations have been found from 6th century BCE to 12th century CE, with the institution reaching its greatest prominence under the Mauryan and Gupta empires. Shrenis are attested across a wide range of sources, including the grammatical work of Pāṇini, the Buddhist Jātaka tales, the Arthashastra, the Dharmaśāstra legal literature, Jainism texts, Sanskrit epics, Tamil Sangam literature, and a large body of donative inscriptions.

Over a period of time, some shrenis became very wealthy with surplus resources, and acted as custodians and bankers of religious and other endowments. One of the widely referred shreni was of ivory carvers of Vidisha (in the modern Indian state of Madhya Pradesh). This shreni is accredited with sponsoring and financially supporting the construction of the southern gateway of the stupa at Sanchi, a World Heritage Site.

== Etymology ==
The word śreṇi is derived from a Sanskrit term meaning a 'row','line', or 'series', and by extension a corporate body or association of persons following a common pursuit. In legal usage, it came to denote an occupational corporation. Related and overlapping terms have also been noted in several sources—including gaṇa, pūga, nigama, and saṃgha—used in particular periods or regions. The Indian Epigraphical Glossary defines śreṇi as a corporation or guild.

== History ==
The roots of shrenis in India are usually traced to the later Vedic period, when texts refer to groups of weavers, carpenters, smiths, and other craftspeople. Scholars have noted these early groupings to have been informal, but they established patterns of cooperation, division of labour, and hereditary specialisation from which formal organisations emerged, and may have contributed in solidifying the caste system.

By the 6th-5th century BCE, a period of urban expansion, lengthening trade routes, and the spread of economy based on money in the Ganges valley, shrenis appear as recognisable institutions. Pāṇini (commonly dated to the 4th century BCE) refers to them, along with Jātaka literature, which describes occupational and groups in towns and villages. Buddhist texts, such as the Mahāvastu and the Milinda Pañha note large number of trades and crafts, including a high degree of occupational differentiation. Several sources have recorded that a number of shrenis converted collectively to Buddhism and Jainism, religions that found a significant support among the urban mercantile class (vaishya).

Shrenis were well established under the Mauryan empire, Kautilya's Arthashastra treats them as normal part of economic and administrative life, noting that even rulers might borrow from them in times of need. The institution is held to have reached its heights during the Gupta period, when shreni heads (śreṣṭhins), caravan leaders (sārthavāhas), and senior officers sat on town and district councils. Powerful shrenis of the era standardised practices within their trades, accumulated substantial capital, financed major religious and public works, and in some cases, acted as bankers to the wider society.

In post-Gupta and early medieval centuries, the great merchant corporations of the south remained influential and conducted extensive long-distance and maritime trade in the Indian Ocean region. Scholars have noted that from roughly the end of the first millennium CE, the prominence of classical shrenis gradually declined amid changing political structures and patters of commerce.

== Organisation and governance ==
A shreni was mostly a self-governing body, usually headed by a leader, Buddhist sources have referred them as jeṭṭhaka or pamukha, with other text using pradhāna. The head might attain the office by heredity or by selection by an assembly of the membership, the heads were assisted by a council of senior members and by clerks or secretaries (kāyasthas). Classical accounts note that a head found guilty of misconduct could be removed or punished by the membership. The most important shreni leaders sometimes sat on a ruler's regional councils, served as royal advisors, or took part in official state ceremonies.

== Functions ==
The economic activities of trades were largely managed by shrenis: procuring raw materials, organising production, controlling quality of goods, fixing of wages or prices, and locating and securing markets for their products. As they accumulated surplus wealth, the took financial roles, received deposits, lent money, and acted as custodians of religious or charitable institutions.

Shrenis exercised a quasi-judicial authority over their own members, operating under their own customary codes, often termed shreni-dharma (see below). They also performed social and charitable functions.

Scholars have noted these trade and profession based groupings to have established informal patterns of cooperation, division of labour, and hereditary specialisation which may have fed into the caste system. Scholars have also opined that as each economic activity and craft had its specific traditions and trade secrets, shrenis were formed to protect the same, and the traditional knowledge and craft was kept within the shreni through endogamy. This may have resulted in the strict caste-based endogamy seen later. The primary evidence for this transition comes from the 9th-century Siyadoni inscription which documents a multigenerational economic and social evolution. The inscription tracks a specific individual who worked as a nemaka-vanija (a salt dealer or merchant). The inscription explicitly notes that his father was also a nemaka-vanija, proving that the profession had become generational. By the conclusion of the inscription, the family is described not just by their profession, but as members of the nemaka-jati (salt-dealer caste).

== Legal status and shreni-dharma ==
The Dharmaśāstra tradition recognised shreni as a legitimate corporate body whose internal regulations carried legal weight. The Manusmriti counsels the king to ascertain and respect the established law of various shrenis when administering justice; stating that "A king must inquire into the law of groups (jāti), of districts (ganapada), of guilds (shreni), and of families (kula)."
