= Entrepôt =

Hub for commercial activity

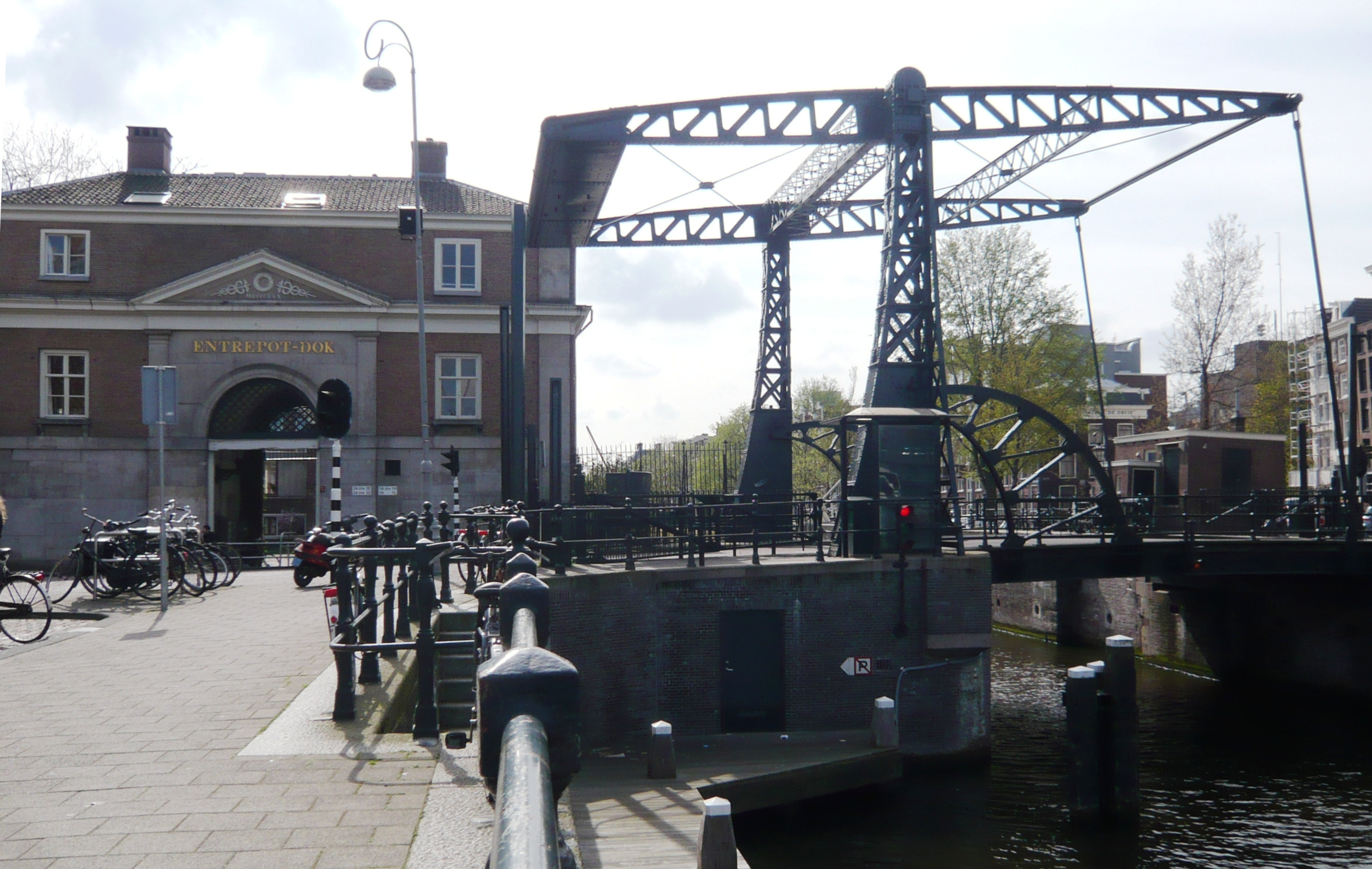
The entrepôt dock of Amsterdam completed in 1830 as a warehouse to store goods entrepôt, or tax-free in transit

An entrepôt (English: /ˈɒntrəpoʊ/ ON-trə-poh; French: [ɑ̃tʁəpo]) is a transshipment port, city, or trading post where merchandise may be imported, stored, or traded, usually to be exported again. Typically located on a crossroads, river, canal, or maritime trade route, these trade hubs played a critical role in trade during the age of sail. Modern logistics, supply chain networks, and border controls have largely made entrepôts obsolete, or reduced them in number, but the term is still used to refer to duty-free ports or those with a high volume of re-export trade.

Railways, container ships, air freight, and telecommunications have created a world in which commodities and manufactured goods are shifted from one part of the globe to another in regular, controlled, and reliable streams, eliminating the factors which once made entrepots central to trade networks; see just-in-time manufacturing. But, as Dutch economist T. P. van der Kooy has pointed out and P. W. Klein has restated, before the Industrial Revolution the flow of goods from one part of the world to another, even one region of a country to another, was so irregular and unpredictable that there was no possibility of achieving any sort of steady distribution, any balancing of supply and demand, or any sort of price stability, except by stockpiling great reserves of commodities in central storehouses, i.e. entrepôts.

Entrepôt also means 'warehouse' in modern French, and is derived from the Latin roots inter 'between' + positum 'position', literally 'that which is placed between'. Entrepôts had an important role in the early modern period, when mercantile shipping flourished between Europe and its colonial empires in the Americas and Asia. Traders often did not want to travel the whole route, and thus used entrepôts along the way to sell their goods. This could conceivably lead to more attractive profits for those who were suited to traveling the entire route. The basic need for these central reservoirs of goods, to iron out the unevenness of supply and ensure a certain regularity and stability of prices, often bestowed enormous economic and political power on the main entrepots, resulting in competition between them.

Many major 17th century entrepots, like the city of Antwerp, Belgium, continue to be major centers of transshipment and trade into the 21st century. Other entrepots further down the trade hierarchy, for example Buffalo, New York, have suffered as technology has shifted trade routes and reduced the need for transshipment through a particular route. In the case of Buffalo this was partly caused by the obsolescence of the Erie Canal by newer technologies and routes.

== Examples ==
=== Africa ===
- Alexandria, Egypt
- Cape Town, South Africa

=== Americas ===
- Baltimore, Maryland, US
- Colón, Panama
- New Orleans, Louisiana
- São Paulo, Brazil
- Valparaíso, Chile

=== Asia ===
- Busan, South Korea
- Dubai, United Arab Emirates
- Hong Kong, China
- Manila, Philippines
- Port of Kaohsiung, Taiwan
- Port Klang, Malaysia
- Shanghai, China
- Singapore
- Tianjin, China
- Tokyo, Japan
- Surabaya, Indonesia
- Vizhinjam International Seaport, India

=== Europe ===
- Amsterdam, Netherlands
- Istanbul, Turkey
- Liverpool, United Kingdom
- Marseille, France

=== Oceania ===
- Port of Port Hedland, Australia

== See also ==
- Factory (trading post) – Type of medieval trading post
- Free port – Geographic area where economic activity between and within countries is less regulated
