= Company of Merchant Adventurers =

The Company of Merchant Adventurers usually refers to the Company of Merchant Adventurers of London, founded in 1407 and London's leading guild of overseas merchants.

It may also refer to:

- Company of Merchant Adventurers to New Lands, founded in 1551, which later developed into the Muscovy Company or the Russia Company
- Company of Merchant Adventurers of Newcastle
- Company of Merchant Adventurers of Exeter
- Company of Merchant Adventurers of York who, uniquely still own and use their original timber-framed Guildhall completed by 1368, the Merchant Adventurers' Hall
- The Bristol equivalent is the Society of Merchant Venturers, now a charitable organisation
- The Adventurers' Act 1640 was so called to encourage London's merchant adventurers to lend money to the Long Parliament to pay for the Wars of the Three Kingdoms
