= Siron Khurd =

Village in Uttar Pradesh, India

Siron Khurd Sīyaḍoṇi
- Village
- Location in Uttar Pradesh, India
- Coordinates: 24.82667°N 78.31939°E
- Country: India
- State: Uttar Pradesh
- District: Lalitpur
- Tehsil: Lalitpur

Area
  - Total: 4.389 km^{2} (1.695 sq mi)

Population (2011)
  - Total: 1,437
  - Density: 327.4/km^{2} (848.0/sq mi)
- Time zone: UTC+5:30 (IST)
- PIN: 284124

Siron Khurd is a village in Jakhaura block of Lalitpur district, Uttar Pradesh, India. It is identified with the early medieval city of Sīyaḍoṇi, which was a major commercial and political centre during the 10th century under the Gurjara-Pratihāra empire. As of 2011, Siron Khurd had a population of 1,437, in 238 households.

== Geography ==
Siron Khurd is located about 15 km northwest of Lalitpur, the district headquarters.

According to the 2011 census, Siron Khurd has a total area of 438.9 hectares, of which 266.6 were currently farmland and 58.6 were under non-agricultural use. 59.0 hectares were classified as cultivable but not currently under any agricultural use, and 10.1 were classified as non-cultivable. No forests, orchards, or pastures existed on village lands.

== History: the early medieval city of Sīyaḍoṇi ==
Siron Khurd is identified with the early medieval city of Sīyaḍoṇi. The primary source for the medieval city is a single inscription found at Siron Khurd in the late 1800s. This inscription contains two separate parts: the first part is a copy of 27 different deeds recording donations made on separate occasions between 907 and 968; the second part is a poem recounting the exploits of a brahmin family called Rayakabhatta. These inscriptions provide historians a source of information

=== Commerce ===
Sīyaḍoṇi was first and foremost a commercial centre. According to Aman Mishra, Sīyaḍoṇi's growth as a city was because of its location on an important trade route. Mishra writes that the city's economy was primarily based on long-distance trade, and locals also engaged in rent-seeking behaviour such as charging rent on land or interest on loans.

At least five different marketplaces (haṭṭas) are attested at Sīyaḍoṇi: Dosihaṭṭa, Prasannahaṭṭa, Caturhaṭṭa (possibly identical with the "Catuṣkahaṭṭa" mentioned elsewhere in the text), Kallapālānāmsatkahaṭṭa (which was owned by the Kallapālas), and Vasantamahattakahaṭṭa (which was possibly named after a guild leader). Sīyaḍoṇi also had a customs house (the Sīyaḍoṇi satka maṇḍapikā) and apparently a mint as well.

Various types of artisans are mentioned in the Sīyaḍoṇi inscription: potters, stonecutters, sugar boilers, oil millers, and liquor distillers. Only two merchant specialties are mentioned: those mainly dealing in salt and those dealing in betel. Sīyaḍoṇi's salt merchants seem to have been especially prominent – of the 27 donation deeds in the Sīyaḍoṇi inscription, 17 were by salt merchants. Salt was a highly prized commodity in early medieval India, and Sīyaḍoṇi's salt merchants likely gained their wealth from importing salt and then shipping it off to various destinations, where they sold it for a large profit.

=== Governance ===
Sīyaḍoṇi was a sub-capital of the Gurjara-Pratihāra empire, ruled by local feudatories subject to the main Gurjara-Pratihāra kings. The exact nature of this arrangement is unclear; the feudatories may have been assigned to govern the city on a temporary basis. Four different rulers of Sīyaḍoṇi are mentioned in the Sīyaḍoṇi inscription, over a period of about 60 years: Bhoja, Mahendrapāla, Kṣitipāla, and finally Devapāla. They are mentioned with various titles, such as mahāpratihāra, samādhigataśeṣamahāśabda, and mahāsāmantādhipati.

The feudatory rulers of Sīyaḍoṇi appointed pañcakulas to serve as the city's administrative body. The names of some pañcakula's members are recorded, but their backgrounds are not. Other officials, such as karaṇikas and kauptikas, are also attested at Sīyaḍoṇi.

While Sīyaḍoṇi was under the rule of these feudatories, the city itself seems to have had at least some autonomy. For example, the first donation mentioned is one where the whole town, as a corporate body, granted a field to the temple of Nārāyaṇabhattāraka.

=== Layout of the city ===
The Sīyaḍoṇi inscription calls the city a paṭṭana, indicating it was a relatively large city. Brajadulal Chattopadhyaya wrote that Sīyaḍoṇi was probably physically larger than the contemporary city of Tattānandapura (present-day Ahar, Uttar Pradesh) because of Sīyaḍoṇi's many marketplaces. Multiple types of streets are mentioned in the Sīyaḍoṇi inscription; there was probably some functional distinction between them. One street is mentioned as belonging to merchants (vaṇijonijarathyā).

Several different terms for residences are encountered: aparasaraka (houses with a porch or vestibule), āvāsanikā (dwellings in general), and gṛhabhitti (house sites). There does not seem to have been any segregation of castes into different neighbourhoods.

=== Temples and temple donations ===
Several different temples are attested in the Sīyaḍoṇi inscription: those of Nārāyaṇabhattāraka, Śivabhattāraka, Bhaillasvāmī, and Sīgākīyadeva. These were all built by merchants. The donations recorded in the inscription include merchants assigning various houses and shops to these temples, so that their rent would go to the temple. This rent was mostly paid in cash. Besides the dramma, which is the most commonly attested coin from early medieval India, many different forms of currency are mentioned in the Sīyaḍoṇi inscription (not all of which are necessarily local in origin, or even coins).

== Demographics ==
As of 2011, Siron Khurd had a population of 1,437, in 238 households. This population was 53.0% male (761) and 47.0% female (676). The 0-6 age group numbered 246 (134 male and 112 female), or 17.1% of the total population. 267 residents were members of Scheduled Castes, or 18.6% of the total.

== Infrastructure ==
As of 2011, Siron Khurd had 1 primary school; it did not have any kind of healthcare facilities. Drinking water was provided by well and hand pump; there were no public toilets. The village had no post office or public library; there was at least some access to electricity for residential and agricultural purposes. Streets were made of both kachcha and pakka materials.

== See also ==
- Ahar, Uttar Pradesh: Site of the contemporary city of Tattānandapura
- Gwalior: Another major political centre under the Gurjara-Pratiharas during the 10th century
