= Aurangabad, Bulandshahr =

- town
- Location in Uttar Pradesh, India
- Coordinates: 28.50°N 77.96°E
- Country: India
- State: Uttar Pradesh
- District: Bulandshahr
- Founder: Miya Syed Murad Ali Naqvi URF Dada Miya
- Named for: Emperor Aurangzeb

Population (2011)
  - Total: 26,544

Languages
  - Official: Hindi
- Time zone: UTC+5:30 (IST)
- Postal code: 203401

Aurangabad is a nagar panchayat, a town that has rapidly transitioned from rural to urban. It is located in the Bulandshahr district of the Indian state of Uttar Pradesh. Aurangabad is inherited by sayeds of aurangabad. Sayeds of aurangabad win it undern mughal empire, During Aurangzeb pir Abdul Aziz Sahab (R.A) he was the pir of Aurangzeb . Aurangzeb's grave is near his grave which is situated in Khuldabad in Maharashtra's Aurangabad. Aurangabad sayeds was the great pirs. Aurangabad sayeds have nearly 400 villages and also Delhi in it.

== Location and landmarks ==
Aurangabad is located at coordinates: 28.50°N 77.96°E. The town lies on the state highway connecting Bulandshahr and Garhmukteshwar. It is about 15 km (9.3 mi) from Bulandshahr and connects the Jahangirabad, Bulandshahr and Garhmukteshwar roads. Aurangabad is surrounded by the villages of Hingthala Bhawsi, Sega Jagatpur, Saidpur, and Lakhaoti. The market is divided into 15 wards.

At the old center of Aurangabad is a Nageshwar Mahadev temple.

== Trade ==
Aurangabad is part of a growing potato belt and other vegetables have many cold storage facilities. Aurangabad having mango orchids. Anamika Sugar Mill is a hub for sugarcane farmers.

== Demographics ==
According to the 2001 Indian census, Aurangabad had a population of 20,072. Males constitute 53% of the population and females 47%. Aurangabad has an average literacy rate of 43%, lower than the national average of 59.5%, with the male literacy rate at 55% and female literacy at 30.5%. 19% of the population is under 6 years of age.
