= Kolluru Suryanarayana =

Kolluru Suryanarayana was an Indian historian, who worked at the Andhra University. He is the Chairman of the Mallampalli Somasekhara Sarma Historical Research Foundation and former head of the department of history at Andhra University. He has published more than 50 research articles and is an member of the Epigraphical Society of India and the Indian History Congress. He has conducted extensive research on the Chalukyas.

== Works ==
- History of the Minor Chalukya Families in Medieval Andhradesa, B.R. Publishing Corporation, 1986
- Feudatories Under Eastern Chalukyas: History and Culture of Andhras, Gian Publishing House, 1987
- Inscriptions of the Minor Chalukya Dynasties of Andhra Pradesh, Mittal Publications, 1993
- Madhyandhra Yuga Charitraka Vyasamulu (in Telugu), Kolluru Ramu, 1989
- Chalukya Vyasa Manjari (in Telugu), Kolluru Ramu, 1992
- Puratana Saiva Kshetram Panchadharla (in Telugu), Bhagavatula Charitable Trust, 1988
