= Amsterdam Entrepôt =

Dutch Republic trade system (1600s)

Coordinates: 44.5638°N 0.2256°W

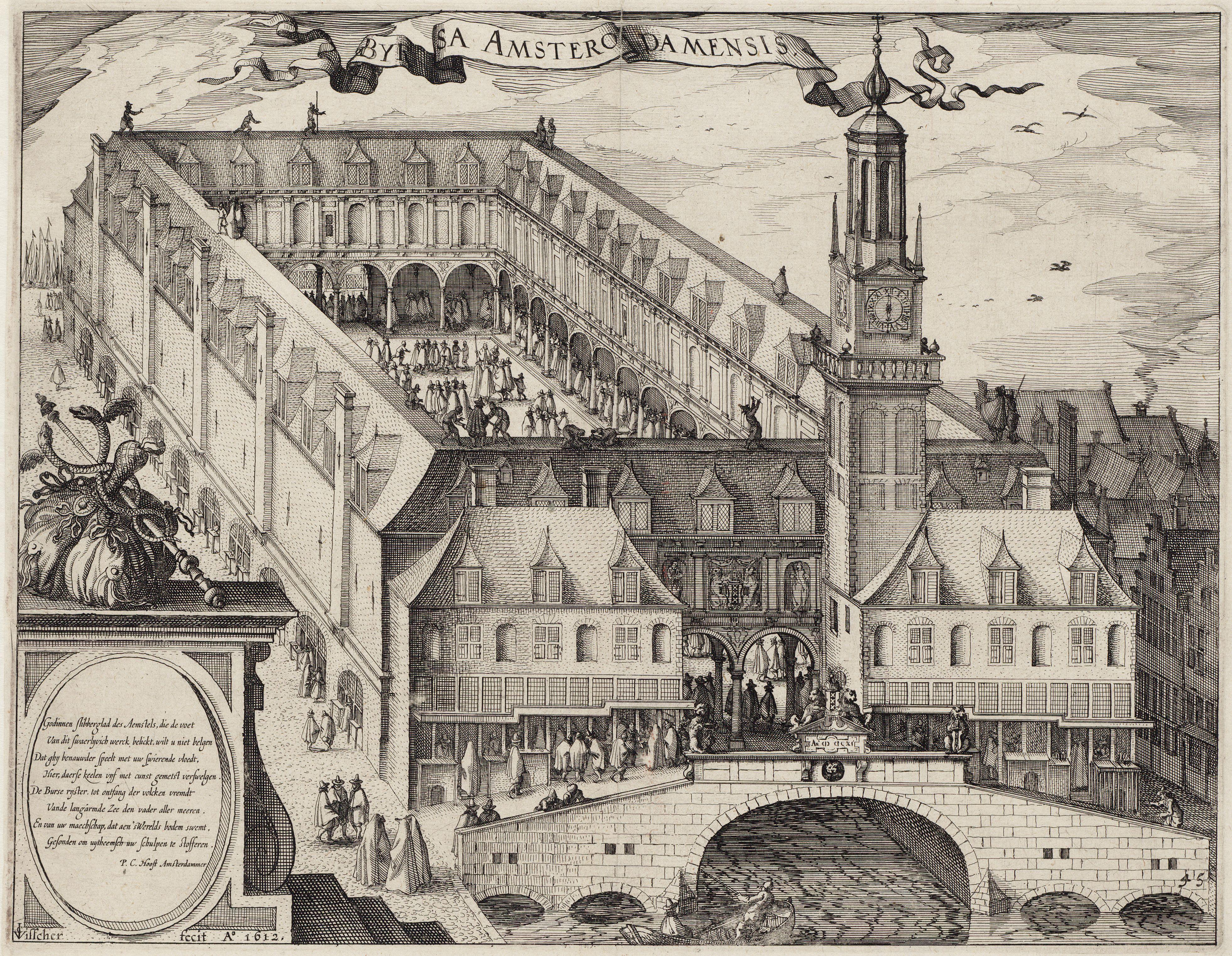
Amsterdam Stock Exchange c. 1612 by Claes Janszoon Visscher

The Amsterdam Entrepôt is the shorthand term that English-language economic historiographers use to refer to the trade system that helped the Dutch Republic achieve primacy in world trade during the 17th century. The Dutch prefer the term stapelmarkt, which has less currency in the English language.

== The entrepôt system ==
In the Middle Ages, local rulers sometimes gave the right to establish staple ports to certain cities. Amsterdam had never received such formal rights (unlike e.g., Dordrecht and Veere), but in practice, the city established a staple-market economy in the 15th and 16th centuries. This economy was not limited to a single commodity, though at first Baltic grain dominated it. It came into being because the economic and technological conditions of the time required a trade-network, based on what is known in economic terms as an entrepôt, a central point (for a given geographic area) where goods are brought together and physically traded, before they are re-exported to their final destinations. This need followed from the fact that, in those days, transportation of goods was slow, expensive, irregular, and prone to disruption; and that supply and demand for goods fluctuated wildly and unpredictably. The risks entailed by these circumstances put a premium on the creation of such a fixed base, where commodities could be stockpiled prior to marketing and final distribution. Furthermore, concentrating storage, transport, and insurance facilities in one place helped reduce transaction costs and keep long-term prices more stable than they otherwise would have been. The entrepôt functioned thus as a central reservoir of commodities, a regulating mechanism smoothing out fluctuations in supply and demand over time and minimizing the effects of interruptions and bottlenecks.

The entrepôt performed an additional function, a derivative of its primary market-function: the physical proximity of merchants promoted the exchange of information about market forces, prices, and developments in the factors underlying supply and demand. This not only lowered the cost of information-gathering but even led to decreasing marginal information costs. Other things being equal, this externality would lower the total marginal cost of goods trading through the entrepôt. It is a well-known economic fact that in circumstances of decreasing marginal costs, economies of scale occur, which can give an advantage to early entrants that permits them to outgrow their competitors, sometimes even leading to a natural monopoly. This may explain why in the field of entrepôts certain markets (Antwerp, Amsterdam) gained a dominant position for some time, while others (London, Hamburg) were left behind and only came into their own when the special circumstances favoring the others came to an end. In the case of Amsterdam, those circumstances changed when the technological possibilities of direct trade improved, obviating the intermediating function of the entrepôt.

== Historical evolution of the system ==
The mechanism underlying the entrepôt trading-system does not explain the peculiar success of the Dutch Republic and Amsterdam in particular. Other merchant cities might have gained this prize and as a matter of fact, Antwerp for a time did. But the Antwerp entrepôt was destroyed with the Fall of Antwerp (1584–1585) and the subsequent expulsion of its Calvinist inhabitants (half of the city population), followed by the centuries-long blockade of the Scheldt trade.

To explain the Dutch success we have to take account of a number of factors that in isolation still do not explain the Dutch primacy in world trade, but whose interplay may go far in doing that. The Dutch had gained an important role in the Baltic trade (grain especially) in the 15th and 16th century because of the nature of commodities exchanged (herring for grain, a low-value, high-volume bulk trade) and the dominance of the Dutch in the herring fisheries. These factors became dominant in this trade because Dutch shippers experienced a structural fall in shipping costs due to revolutionary innovations in shipbuilding (the wind-driven sawmill) — which brought down construction costs — and in ship-design (the Fluyt ship that required smaller crews) at the turn of the 17th century. This so improved their competitive position that they soon dominated the European bulk trades, not only the Baltic trade, but also the salt trade of the Iberian Peninsula.

High profitability of the bulk trade resulted in the possibility of large savings, and the reservoir of savings looking for profitable investment eventually resulted in a lowering of interest rates as a primary effect, and of the development of sophisticated financial markets as a secondary effect. Such financial markets also profited from the phenomenon of decreasing marginal information cost; this soon helped make Amsterdam an important financial center also.

The physical proximity of a strong financial sector partially explains why after 1590 Amsterdam also became a center for the low-volume, high-value "rich trades" (i.e., commodities like spices, silk, and high-quality textiles). In such trades the Dutch low shipping rates did not necessarily provide a competitive advantage. What did attract the specialists in this type of trade (apart from the favorable financing possibilities) was the influx of skilled workers and entrepreneurs from the southern Netherlands in the 1580s that helped transfer the sophisticated Flemish textile industry to the Republic. This gave her an industrial base for her export trade. The "rich trades" were also stimulated by government intervention, as they were by nature (because of the price-inelasticity of their demand) prone to large price fluctuations (as a little over-supply would bring about a large fall in prices). The readiness of the Dutch government to regulate markets and to provide legal monopolies to chartered companies like the Dutch East India Company helped to lessen the risk of investment in such enterprises.

All these factors conspired to concentrate trade at entrepôts (in view of their trade advantages as described above) and in particular at the Amsterdam entrepôt (once Antwerp had been eliminated as a competitor) because of the time-window (1590-1620) in which they came to exert their influence. The rise of the Amsterdam entrepôt was therefore to some extent also a matter of being in the right place at the right time. But once the entrepôt had been established, its growth-promoting peculiarities helped Amsterdam (and the port cities in the maritime zone of the Netherlands, interlinked to Amsterdam by the area's inland waterways) achieve its position of economic preeminence.

Eventually this preeminence would be undermined by technological and economic changes that would eliminate the advantages of the entrepôt and promote disintermediation. However, these developments were not to occur until the 18th century. During the 17th century, the need for intermediation in commodities and financial markets still reigned supreme. The Amsterdam entrepôt provided great advantages to European consumers and producers (inherent in its operation) and to the merchants that used it. But there also were losers in the process. Competitors, like the Hanseatic and English merchants, lost appreciable market share and hence income, especially after the trade embargoes imposed by Spain on Dutch commerce during the Eighty Years' War had been lifted. The resurgence of Dutch trade on Spain and Portugal and other Mediterranean countries after 1647 overwhelmed the Republic's competitors.

To remedy this situation, first England and later France took to coercion in the form of economic and military warfare. The English Navigation Acts of 1651 and 1660-1663 restricted free trade in an attempt to divert trade to a putative London entrepôt. However, as the Acts only regulated English and colonial trade (and imperfectly so) and England only managed to dominate a few commodities markets for which it formed the main customer, these attempts were never successful. England would only achieve primacy in world trade after other factors had undermined the Dutch entrepôt. French protectionism was eventually more successful, because the French and Dutch economies were complementary, rather than competitive like the Dutch and English economies. Restricting trade between France and the Republic therefore resulted in the roll-back of the specialization that Comparative advantage had engendered in both economies (though at great cost to the French consumer also) and helped throttle the once-flourishing Dutch industries.

In the 17th century, the economic elite of Amsterdam moved with William of Orange to England, where they helped to restart the English international trade, leaving behind in Amsterdam the more religious, and less competitive, burghers.

During the 18th century this combination of adverse economic and technological developments (promoting disintermediation) and foreign protectionism led to a relative decline of Dutch preeminence in world trade and of the Amsterdam entrepôt. It also led to a fundamental restructuring of the Dutch economy, with a large degree of deindustrialization and a shift to service industries, like merchant banking, and foreign direct investment in emerging economies, like the Great Britain of the Industrial Revolution. By that time there was no longer a role for entrepôts in world trade—except Rotterdam, New York, Singapore, and Hong Kong.

== Sources ==
- Israel, J.I. (1989), Dutch Primacy in World Trade 1585-1740, Clarendon Press Oxford, ISBN 0-19-821139-2
- Israel, J.I. (1997), "England's Mercantilist Response to Dutch World Trade Primacy, 1647-74," in: Conflicts of Empires. Spain, the Low Countries and the struggle for world supremacy 1585-1713. Hambledon Press, ISBN 1-85285-161-9, pp. 305–318
- Kindleberger, C.P. (1995) The world economy and national finance in historical perspective. University of Michigan Press, ISBN 0-472-10642-2, ISBN 978-0-472-10642-4
- Lesger, C. (2006) The Rise of the Amsterdam Market and Information Exchange. Aldershot, Hants ISBN 0-7546-5220-3
- Vries, J. de, and Woude, A. van der (1997), The First Modern Economy. Success, Failure, and Perseverance of the Dutch Economy, 1500-1815, Cambridge University Press, ISBN 978-0-521-57825-7
