= Kanakalatha Mukund =

Indian historian

Kanakalatha Mukund (née Narasimhan) is an Indian historian. Her areas of research were the mercantile history of south India and the history of women's traditional rights and occupations.

== Life and career ==
Kanakalatha Narasimhan was born to Janaki Narasimhan and C.V. Narasimhan. Her father was a member of the Indian Civil Service and an Under-Secretary-General of the United Nations. She has a sister, Hemalatha. She graduated from Barnard College, New York City, in the class of 1962. In 1964, she married Jagannathan Mukund.

Kanakalatha Mukund has a PhD in economics. She worked at the University of Bombay, Bhopal University, and at the Centre for Economic and Social Studies, Hyderabad till retirement. Her areas of research were the mercantile history of south India and the history of women's traditional rights and occupations.

In her research on mercantile networks in Madras and the interaction between local and English traders, Mukund showed that the richest Indian merchants acted as moneylenders as well as brokers of letters of credit and forward agreements between producers such as weavers and the English. The English would pay the weavers in advance who would then find their own suppliers. The Indian traders themselves were divided along caste lines and competed with each other; the tension between them often erupted into violence. While in the earlier period of their interaction, the Indian producers were able to resist English attempts to control their supplies, over time, as English power expanded over south India, both the producers and their Indian merchant capitalist began to lose out, so that by 1725, south Indian textile commerce began to collapse.

== Selected works ==
=== Articles ===
- Kanakalatha Mukund (1984). "Keynes on Indian Economic Problems and Policies - A Historical Appraisal". Indian Economic Journal. 32 (1).
- Kanakalatha Mukund (1991). "Mining in South India in the 17th and 18th Centuries". Indica. 28 (1).
- Kanakalatha Mukund (1992). "Turmeric Land: Women's Property Rights in Tamil Society Since Early Medieval Times". Economic & Political Weekly. 27 (17).
- Kanakalatha Mukund (1992). "Indian Textile Industry in 17th and 18th Centuries: Structure, Organisation and Responses". Economic & Political Weekly. 27 (38): 2057–2065. JSTOR 4398913.
- Kanakalatha Mukund (1995). "Caste Conflict in South India in Early Colonial Port Cities – 1650-1800". Studies in History. 11 (1). Sage.
- Kanakalatha Mukund (1999). "Women's Property Rights in South India: A Review". Economic & Political Weekly. 34 (22).

=== Books ===
- Kanakalatha Mukund, ed. (1990). Andhra Pradesh Economy in Transition. Hyderabad: Centre for Economic and Social Studies.
- Kanakalatha Mukund (1999). The Trading World of the Tamil Merchant: Evolution of Merchant Capitalism in the Coromandel. Orient Blackswan. ISBN 978-81-250-1661-8.
- Kanakalatha Mukund; B. Syama Sundari (2001). Traditional Industry in the New Market Economy: The Cotton Handlooms of Andhra Pradesh. Sage. ISBN 8178290111.
- Kanakalatha Mukund (2005). The View from Below: Indigenous Society, Temples, and the Early Colonial State in Tamilnadu, 1700-1835. Orient Blackswan. ISBN 978-81-250-2800-0.
- Kanakalatha Mukund (2015). The World of the Tamil Merchant: Pioneers of International Trade. Penguin Books Limited. ISBN 978-81-8475-612-8.
