= Ahar, Uttar Pradesh =

Village in Uttar Pradesh, India

Ahar
- Village
- Location in Uttar Pradesh, India
- Coordinates: 28.464301°N 78.247828°E
- Country: India
- State: Uttar Pradesh
- District: Bulandshahr
- Tehsil: Anupshahr
- Time zone: UTC+5:30 (IST)

Ahar (Ahar Mahadev) is a village situated in the Anupshahr Tehsil of the Bulandshahr district in Uttar Pradesh, India. It is located 11.98 kilometres from the Mandal headquarters in Anupshahr and is 39.09 kilometres from the district headquarters in Bulandshahar.

There is a dargah in Ahar which is very famous since ancient times, Dargah Syed Ali Hussain Shah, and Syed Ajaj Hussain Shah, in whose memory Urs is celebrated with great pomp every year.

Villages nearby include Mohammadpur Bangar (2.4 km), Bamanpur (2.9 km), Aurangabad Tahapur Bager (3.5 km), Mauharsa (3.6 km), Daravar (4.0 km), Hasanpur Bangar (4.1 km), and Pachdevra (4.7 km). Ahar is located on the west bank of the Ganges and is known for its temples dedicated to Shiva and Avantika.

== History ==
Ahar is identified with the early medieval city of Tattānandapura, which is described in 10 different inscriptions ranging between 867 and 904 CE. Most of these deal with the purchase of houses and house sites in the city, mostly by the local temple of Kāñcanaśrīdevī. Although fragmentary, evidence from the Ahar inscriptions provides a picture of what Tattānandapura was like at the time.

The inscriptions show that Tattānandapura belonged to the Gurjara-Pratihāra empire during this period. They also refer to Tattānandapura as a paṭṭana, referring to a larger town as opposed to a village (grāma, pallī, agrahāra), so it must have been a decently large settlement.

The eastern market area (purvahaṭṭa pradeśa) seems to have been "one of the nerve centres of the town". It was lined with shops and residential buildings. Its description as specifically the "eastern" market area implies that others existed.

Six temples are mentioned in the inscriptions: one of Kāñcanaśrīdevī, or Kanakadevī; one of Nandabhagavatidevī; one of Vāmanasvāmin; one of Gandhadevī; one of Daśāvatāra; and one of Sarvamaṅgalā. Those of Kāñcanaśrīdevī and Nandabhagavatidevī, at least, are described as being somewhat away from the town proper. Both of these temples also owned property in the eastern market area.

Several different types of streets are mentioned in the inscriptions: kurathyā (small, narrow streets), bṛhadrathyā (large streets), and haṭṭamārga (streets leading to the marketplace). These terms are also used in other contemporary sources, so they were probably considered functionally distinct types of streets, but their exact definitions are unknown.

Two basic types of building are referred to in the inscriptions: the āvāri (shops and enclosures) and the gṛha (residential buildings). In some cases, the āvāris seem to have been combined shops and houses, with some having inner apartments. Both kinds of buildings were made of burnt brick and had wooden doors with padlocks. Their typical size, according to inscriptions, was about 27 cubits long. Frequently, inscriptions describe contiguous groups of houses (gṛhabhūmis) inhabited by people from different caste groups.

The city had an active merchant community, with commercial ties to various places. These included the Varkkaṭavaṇik community from Bhillamāla (present-day Bhinmal in Rajasthan), the Gandhikavaṇik community from Mathurā, and also merchants from an unidentified place called Apāpura. Another important community, and possibly the most prominent at Tattānandapura, was the Sauvarṇikavaṇikmahājana. There were also kṣatriya merchants at Tattānandapura.

According to Brajadulal Chattopadhyaya, Tattānandapura evolved as an urban centre because it had already served as a local commercial centre, leading to the clustering of multiple haṭṭas in a close area. The city was formed as an agglomeration of these haṭṭas along with residential areas.

Archaeological mounds at Ahar cover an area of 3800 acres and span almost a mile and a half in length. Site B, which is dated to the 9th century, contained such finds as burnt-brick residences, high-quality pottery samples, hand-powered grinding mills, a mortar, an iron scythe, and at least three different varieties of coins.

Establishing the exact chronology of the site at Ahar is unclear, but the absence of pre-Gupta pottery samples suggests that occupation of the site may have begun during the Gupta or post-Gupta period, with samples continuing through the late medieval period.

== See also ==
- Ahar-Banas culture
