= Kudavayil Balasubramanian =

Indian archaeologist

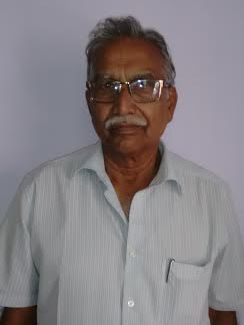
- Kudavayil Balasubramanian
- Born: Kudavayil, Tiruvarur district, India
- Occupation: Archaeologist
- Known for: Discovering over 100 historical artifacts, Authoring books about Tamil history

Kudavayil Balasubramanian (born Kudavayil, Tiruvarur district) is an archaeologist from Tamil Nadu, India. He is former curator and publication manager at Saraswathi Mahal Library located at Thanjavur. He is credited with discovering more than 100 inscriptions, coins, copper plates, sculptures, and paintings now in museums and temples in that state.

Balasubramanian received a bachelor's in zoology, and studied history as a post-graduate. For his contribution to temple art and Tamil language he received (Doctor of Letters (honoris causa)) in February 2016.

Twenty seven books all magnum opuses, twenty booklets, fifty three seminar papers and four hundred and fifty articles have been brought out in the fields of History, Archaeology, Numismatics, Epigraphy, Temple Architecture, Saiva Agamas, Sculptures, Paintings, Music and Dance by Dr. Kudavayil Balasubramanian. His discovery of Nandipuram near Kandiyur and its shrine housing 1000 Siva Lingas, is hailed as the greatest of his achievements. The earlier writings about Nandipuram by a few scholars stand disproved. He did excavations at Agara Ohai and dug out five Chola period bronzes and handed them over to the Tamil Nadu Government. Through his lucubrations, he brought to light the hoary greatness of Kudavayil Kottam of Sangam Age, and added a new and authentic chapter to the South Indian history.

His highly commended work entitled “Thanjai Nayakkar Varalaru” marks a milestone in the field of historic exploration. His work entitled Karunakara Thondaiman, the celebrated General of Kulothunga I, lived in Vandalancheri, the history of which was involved in total darkness. By his extensive research, its historic significance was brought to light. He has discovered more than a hundred inscriptions and a few valuable copper plates, thanks to which useful further research can be pursued. He is well versed in the science of Numismatics. His discovery of the commemorative gold coin issued by Rajaraja pat upon his victory over Sri Lanka and the coins of Koneri Raya and Sundara Pandiya reveal him as a worthy Numismatist. His discourse on the Musical instruments of Tamil Nadu delivered in the MusicAcademy, Chennai, won the recognition of musicians as well as those that play on musical instruments.

His book on Panchamukha Vadya (Kudamuzha) is a classic. He is an acknowledged resource person for operas. He studied in depth the 94 dance karana sculptures etched in the Rajagopuram of Sarngapani Temple at Kumbakonam. Thanks to his in depth knowledge of Gukesa Bharata Lakshana, he identified the dancer as Muruka. The earlier interpretations in this connection stand rectified. His comprehensive works namely, “Thanjai Rajarajecharam, Darasuram Temple, Tiruvarur Thirukkoil and Gopurakalai Marabu” speak to his multi foliate knowledge and his in-depth studies of polymathic works. His work “Udayarkudi Inscriptions – a re–view” has indubitably established the truth of the inscriptions of Udayarkudi. This is proof–positive of the right method of hermeneutics, pursued by him. He has rightly interpreted the vocables’ of Sangam literature as well as the corpus of Thevaram and thereby earned the admiration of scholars.

Passionate about ancient manuscripts he was able to acquire thirty manuscripts in Tamil and Sanskrit, which he gifted to the Saraswati Mahal Library, and Tamil University. Balasubramanian travelled to Cambodia, Malaysia, Java, Sumatra, Borneo and Pali, where he researched and documented his findings. He is an expert on the water management that prevailed during the Chola period. In the light of inscriptions and wide research, he has now established the hyleg (Arudra) and the month (Aadi), relating to the birth of Rajendra Chola.

== Specialization ==
- Dravidian architecture
- Historiography
- Epigraphy, Manuscriptology and Archaeology
- Paintings of Tamil Nadu
- Study of rare musical instruments and dance sculptures
- Numismatics

== Books ==
He has written a number of books in Tamil about history, archaeology, temple study and so on. His noted works include the following:

1. Kudavayirkottam, குடவாயிற்கோட்டம், Society of Archaeological, Historical and Epigraphical Research, Madras, 1978.
2. Karunakarattondaiman, கருணாகரத் தொண்டைமான், SAHER, Madras, 1979.
3. Aroor Azhitther, ஆரூர் ஆழித்தேர் (Temple Car of Tiruvarur), HR & CE Department, Government of Tamil Nadu, 1989.
4. Nandhipuram, Pallava capital in Chola country, நந்திபுரம், Indian National Trust for Arts and Culture, (INTAC), Madras, 1992.
5. Koyil Kalai Marabu, கோயிற்கலை மரபு, (Tradition of Temple Art), Saraswathi Mahal Library, Thanjavur, 1995.
6. Thanjavur (600–1850 A.D.), தஞ்சாவூர் (600-1850 A.D.), Special Publication for 8th International Tamil Conference, 1995.
7. Big Temple of Thanjavur, தஞ்சைப் பெரிய கோயில், Anjana Pathippagam, Thanjavur, 1996.
8. Tamil King Konerirayan, தமிழ் மன்னன் கோனேரிராயன், with the aid of Tamil Development Department, Tamil Nadu Government, 1996.
9. Kudamuzha, a rare five face percussion instrument, குடமுழா, Anjana Pathippagam, Thanjavur, 1997.
10. Rajarajeswaram, ராஜராஜேஸ்வரம், Anjana Pathippagam, Thanjavur, 1997.
11. History of Thanjavur Nayaks, தஞ்சாவூர் நாயக்கர் வரலாறு, Saraswathi Mahal Library, Thanjavur, 1999.
12. Thiyagarajar Thirukkoil, தியாகராஜர் திருக்கோயில், 2000, Agaram, 2012.
13. History of Vallam, வரலாற்றில் வல்லம், 2003.
14. Jayamkondanathar Temple, ஜெயங்கொண்டநாதர் கோயில், 2004.
15. Compilation of articles in archaeology and history, கபிலக்கல் Prabhu Pathippagam, Pattukkottai, 2004.
16. Arathaiperumpazhi, அரதைப்பெரும்பாழி, 2005.
17. Kudandai Periyamadam, குடந்தை பெரிய மடம், 2005.
18. Rajarajechcharam, தஞ்சாவூர்-இராசராசேச்சரம், Swami Dhayananda Educational Trust, 2010.
19. Thirubuvanam, திருபுவனம், 2010
20. Thirundhudevangudi Temple, திருந்துதேவன்குடி திருக்கோயில், 2010.
21. Periyakoil Nutpam, பெரியகோயில் நுட்பம், 2010.
22. Tiruvarur Temple, திருவாரூர் திருக்கோயில், HR & CE Department, Government of Tamil Nadu, 1998, Agaram, 2012.
23. Study of Gopura Art,கோபுரக்கலை மரபு, Koirkalanjiam, Thanjavur, 2004, Agaram, 2013.
24. Darasuram Iravatheswarar Temple, தாராசுரம் ஐராவதீசுவரர் திருக்கோயில்-இராசராசேச்சரம், Swami Dhayananda Educational Trust, 2013.
25. Kalai Iyal Rasanai Katturaigal, கலையியல் ரசனைக் கட்டுரைகள், 2014.
26. Kalvettu Koorum koil kathaigal, கல்வெட்டு கூறும் கோயில் கதைகள், Suriyan Pathippagam, Chennai, 2016.
27. Muppathu Katturaigal, Compilation of 30 Articles, Agaram, Thanjavur, 2018.
28. Rajendra Cholan, ராஜேந்திர சோழன், Agaram, Thanjavur, 2019.
29. Ariya Seithigal Koorum Arputha Alayangal, அரிய செய்திகள் கூறும் அற்புத ஆலயங்கள், Agaram, Thanjavur, 2020
30. Kalaimigu koilgalum Kalvettu Sasanangalum, கலைமிகு கோயில்களும் கல்வெட்டு சாசனங்களும், Agaram, Thanjavur, 2020.
31. Tevara Manbum Oduvar Marabum, தேவார மாண்பும் ஓதுவார் மரபும், Annam, Thanjavur 2021.
32. Sivalayangalum Sivagangai vavikalum, சிவாலயங்களும் சிவகங்கை வாவிகளும், அன்னம், தஞ்சாவூர், 2021

== Awards ==
1. “Kural Nerich Chemmal” – Virudhu from Ulaga Tirukkural Peravai, Thanjavur - 2003.
2. “Thiruvarut Chemmani” – Virudhu from Siruvapari Murugan Abishekakkulu - 2005.
3. “Thirukkoil Ayvupperoli” from Arupattumoovar Mandram, Thanjavur - 2005.
4. “Rajaraja Cholan Award” from Rajarajan Educational and Cultural Centre, Chennai – 2007.
5. “Karikala Cholan Virudhu” from Tamil Ayya Kalvikkazhagam, Thiruvaiyaru - 2009.
6. “Varalarru Nayagar” Award from Karanthai Tamil Sangam – 2011.
7. “Life Time Achievement Award” by Sangeeth Sagar and Russian Centre of Science and Culture, Chennai – 2012.
8. “Rajaraja Cholan Award” from Sadhaya Vizha Festival Committee – 2012.
9. “Thirukkovil Kalaich Chelvar Virudhu” (and a gold coin where the title is inscribed) from Dharumapuram Adhinam – 2013.
10. “Ananda Coomarasamy Kavin Kalai Virudhu” (1.50 lakh cash and shield) from S.R.M. University, Chennai – 2013.
11. “Mannin Sirantha Padaippali Virudhu” from Rotary Club of Thanjavur – 2014.
12. “Ayvurai Viththagar” Virudhu from Appar Arakkattalai – 2014.
13. “Dr. U.V. Swaminathaiyar Tamil Scholar Award” (One lakh cash and a gold coin where the title is inscribed) from Tamil Nadu Government – 2015.
14. “Sekkilar – Tamil Scholar Award” from Sekkilar Research Centre, Chennai – 2015.
15. “Porrammarai Award” (a Gold Coin in which the title inscribed) for the best research scholar – 2015.
