= Staple (trade) =

A staple is a system of trade established by governments to designate specific towns or ports where certain goods had to be traded or exported, serving as regulated centers of commerce and taxation that facilitated control over trade, revenue, and quality standards. It was particularly common in medieval Europe.

== Etymology ==
There are two theories for the origin of the word.

In medieval Latin documents the common expression for staple is stabile emporium, a staple (fixed) market, where such wares had to be brought; hence the assumed derivation of staple from stabile. Its French equivalent is étape, and its German equivalent stapeln, words deriving from Late Latin stapula with the same meaning, derived from stabulum. designating a system that Hadrianus Junius considered to be of Gaulish origin.

But the word is current in various allied meanings in the Germanic languages, as in O. Eng. stapol, stapul, a prop or post, from stapa, a step; Dutch stapel, a pile; Low Ger. stapel, a heap, a warehouse; whence also O. Fr. estaple, estape (N. Fr. étape), a station, a stage, generally a town or mart where certain wares were brought on sale, and hence called 'staple wares', or simply 'staples.' The original idea, therefore, appears to be, not so much a staple or fixed place, as a post or raised platform approached by steps, and arranged for a convenient sale of goods.

The antiquary John Weever, quoting the 16th-century Tuscan merchant Lodovico Guicciardini, defined a staple town "to be a place, to which by the prince's authority and privilege wool, hides of beasts, wine, corn or grain, and other exotic or foreign merchandize are transferred, carried or conveyed to be sold".

== Examples ==
- The Staple (England)
- Amsterdam Entrepôt (Amsterdam stapelmarkt)
- Scottish Staple
- Stapelrecht
