= Anjuvannam =

Medieval merchant guild primarily active in south India

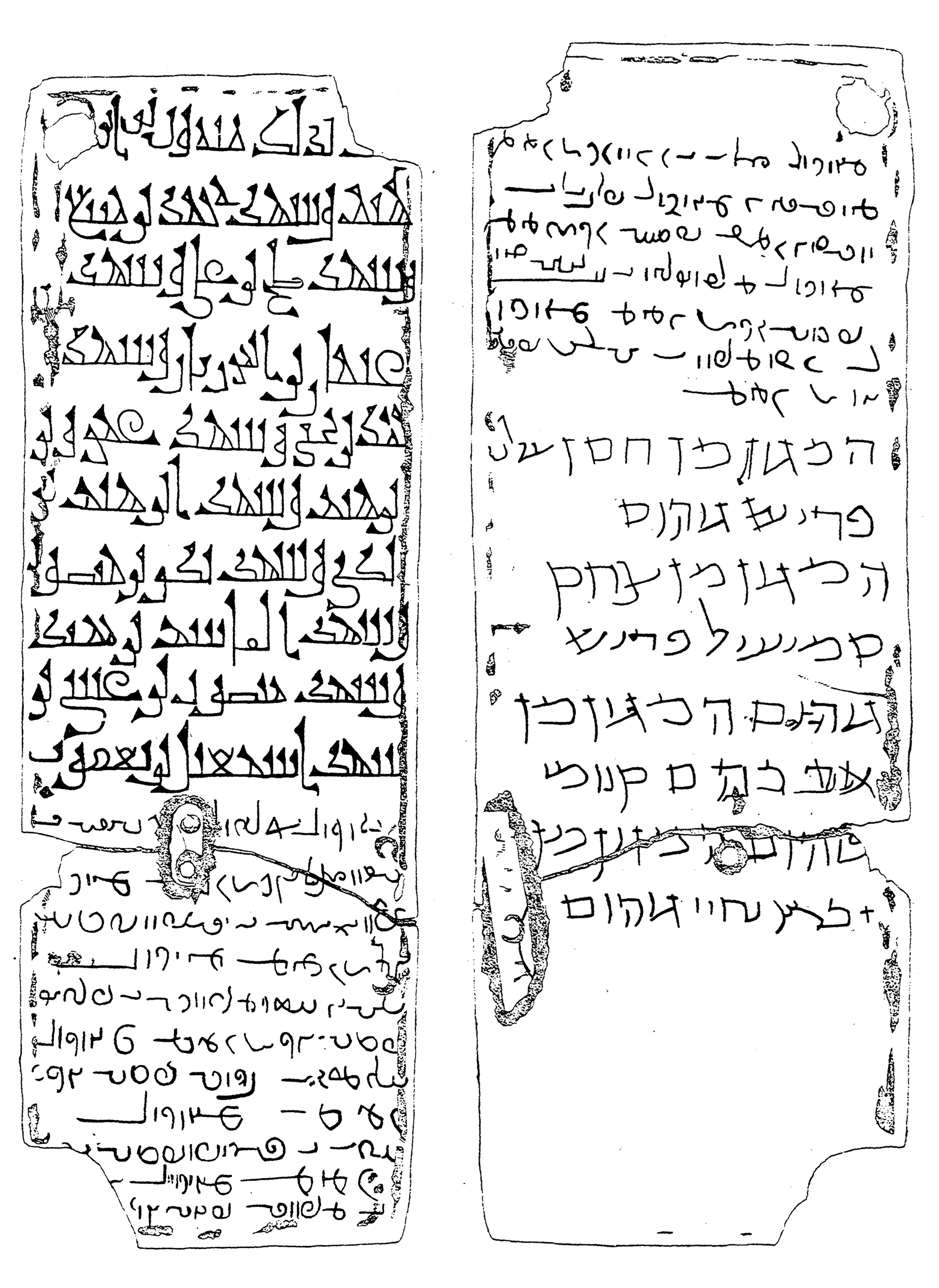
- Quilon Syrian copper plates
- Merged into: Ainurruvar (the Ayyavole Five Hundred)
- Formation: c. 9th century CE
- Dissolved: c. 13th century AD
- Type: Merchant guild
- Purpose: Indian Ocean trade
- Region served: South India (primarily)
- Members: Non-Indian traders (ethnic Persians and Arabs): Jewish, Christian, Muslim and Zoroastrian merchants
- Parent organization: Ainurruvar (in and after the 12th century)

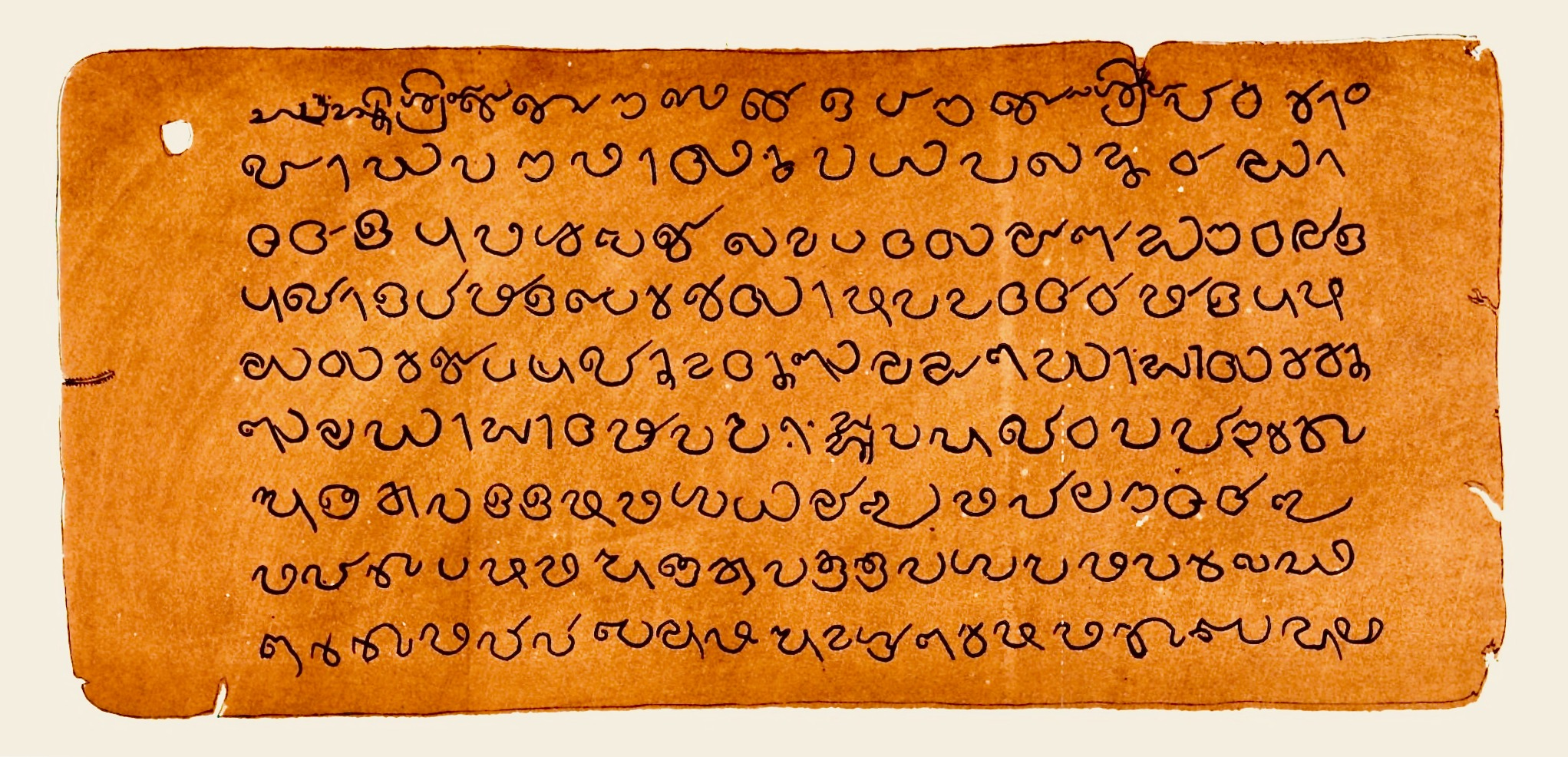
Jewish copper plates of Cochin (c. 1000 CE)

Anjuvannam (in Malayalam, from the Persian anjuman, and hanjama or hanjamana in Telugu or Kannada or hamyamana) typically refers to a medieval merchant guild consisting of non-Indian traders — principally ethnic Persians and Arabs — who were primarily active in south India. Along with manigramam and ainurruvar (the Ayyavole Five Hundred), the anjuvannam merchant guild played a major role in the commercial activities of southern India during the medieval period.

Unlike the manigiramam merchant guild, which also operated in the Indian hinterland, the presence of anjuvannam is found only in coastal towns. In some ports, this guild obtained royal charters that granted special immunities and privileges within those cities. Anjuvannam is mentioned in a number of south Indian inscriptions, most notably in the Quilon Syrian copper plates (c. 849 CE) and the Jewish copper plates of Cochin (c. 1000 CE). The guild was initially engaged in commercial activities along the Kerala coast before expanding its operations to other south Indian coasts. By the 11th century, Anjuvannam was composed predominantly of Muslim traders on both the western and eastern coasts of India and continued to be that way until it disappeared from the historical record as a guild in the 15th century.

== History ==
=== Etymology ===
The term anjuvannam probably originates from a Persian root and is related to Avestan: hanjumana and the Persian anjuman or anǰoman, referring to an organization or association of people. The terms hanjama or hanjamana are found in Telugu and Kannada records, while hanjamana appears in an inscription from the Konkan Coast. According to an earlier explanation, the title anjuvannam derived from the Hindu varna system, wherein any person not belonging to one of the four varnas — Brahmin, Kshatriya, Vaishya, or Shudra — was perhaps referred to as an anjuvannan.

A person belonging to the anjuvannam community is known as an anjuvannan.

=== Composition and area of activity ===
Historian Y. Subbarayalu defined the anjuvannam guild as a "body of West Asian traders". The guild was usually organized by Middle Eastern traders, including Jewish, Christian, Muslim and Zoroastrian or Parsi merchants, operating in south India, largely within the Indian Ocean trade network. These merchants generally operated in the trading ports of the Konkan Coast, Malabar Coast, and Coromandel Coast of south India, and even in Southeast Asia, including Java.

While the manigramam merchant guild operated in the Indian hinterland as well, the anjuvannam merchant guild was found exclusively in coastal towns of south India.

=== Development ===
The earliest concrete epigraphical evidence of the anjuvannam guild comes from the Quilon Syrian copper plates dated to c. 849 CE, which confirm the guild's activity on the Kerala coast (the Malabar Coast) by the mid-9th century CE. From the early 10th century CE, the ainurruvar (the Ayyavole Five Hundred) expanded across southern India, uniting most pre-existing merchant guilds, including the anjuvannam and manigiramam, under its umbrella.

The increasing association of the anjuvannam guild with the Jewish traders of the Malabar Coast is evident from the Jewish copper plates of Cochin (c. 1000 CE). Beginning in the 12th century CE and continuing thereafter, the Five Hundred merchant guild functioned as an umbrella organization for various smaller merchant guilds. During the 11th to 13th centuries, anjuvannam was composed predominantly of Muslim traders on both the western and eastern coasts of India.

== See also ==
- Cochin Jews
- Manigramam
- Trade guilds of South India
