= Manigramam =

Medieval guild in India

Trade Guild (5th Century) & Autonomous Freezone Port (8th & 12th Century)
- Established: 5th Century & Regularized 825 CE
- Headquarters: Kollam, Kodungallur
- Purpose: Arabian Sea & Indian Ocean Trade Serving South India

Historical Line of Merchant Princes
- 1st Prince: Marwan Iso (825 CE)
- 2nd Prince: Iravi Chathan (1024 CE)
- 3rd Prince: Iravikorrtan (1225 CE)

Grants & Awards
- Key Decrees: Quilon Syrian copper plates Viraraghava copper plate
- Royal Honors I: Market Rights & Tax Free Zone In Kollam
- Royal Honors II: Market Rights & Tax Free Zone Thazekad Thrissur
- Royal Honors III: Prince Of Port City & 72 Royal Privileges In Kodungallur Cheraman Who Is Global Merchant Of The Chera Realm. Prince Of Port Makottiyarpattinam. (Cheraman Loka Maha Perum Chettiar and Nagarattin Kartha)

Current Location of Grants
- Quilon Plates: Mar Thoma Church HQ, Thiruvalla
- Viraraghava Plate: Orthodox Theological Seminary, Kottayam
- Thazhekad Church Slab: St. Sebastian's Church, Thazhekad

Manigramam, typically refers to a medieval merchant guild organized by itinerant Indian traders, primarily active in southern India. It is widely attested in the Viraraghava copper plate as being an important trading guild, underscored by its leader, Iravikorttan receiving 72 Royal privileges from the Chera King at the time of its issue. (c. 1225 CE) Along with the ainurruvar (the Ayyavole Five Hundred) and the anjuvannam (the anjuman), the manigiramam played a significant role in the commercial activities of the region. Unlike the anjuvannam, which was confined to the port-towns of southern India, the manigramam operated in both port towns and hinter-land trade centers. Professor M. G. S. Narayanan notes that Iravichathan who received concessions from Rajasimha, Chera ruler of Kodungallur via the Thazekad Copper plates and Iravikorttan, who received them through the Viraraghava copper plates are two separate individuals who obtained trade concessions in 1024 CE and 1225 CE on behalf of Manigramam, alluding to the fact that this specific naming convention could be a corporate, titular name of the guild master. He notes that the title did not automatically pass down from father to son like in a royal succession, but was passed by corporate succession and was usually held inside a powerful Oligarchy of seafaring merchants.

== History ==
A body of merchants known as "the Vaniggrama" or "Vaniyagrama" is attested in northern India as early as the first century BCE. They are mentioned in a Karle inscription (first century BCE), a charter of king Vishnusena from Kathiawad (6th century CE), and in a Sanjeli charter of king Toramana (6th century CE).

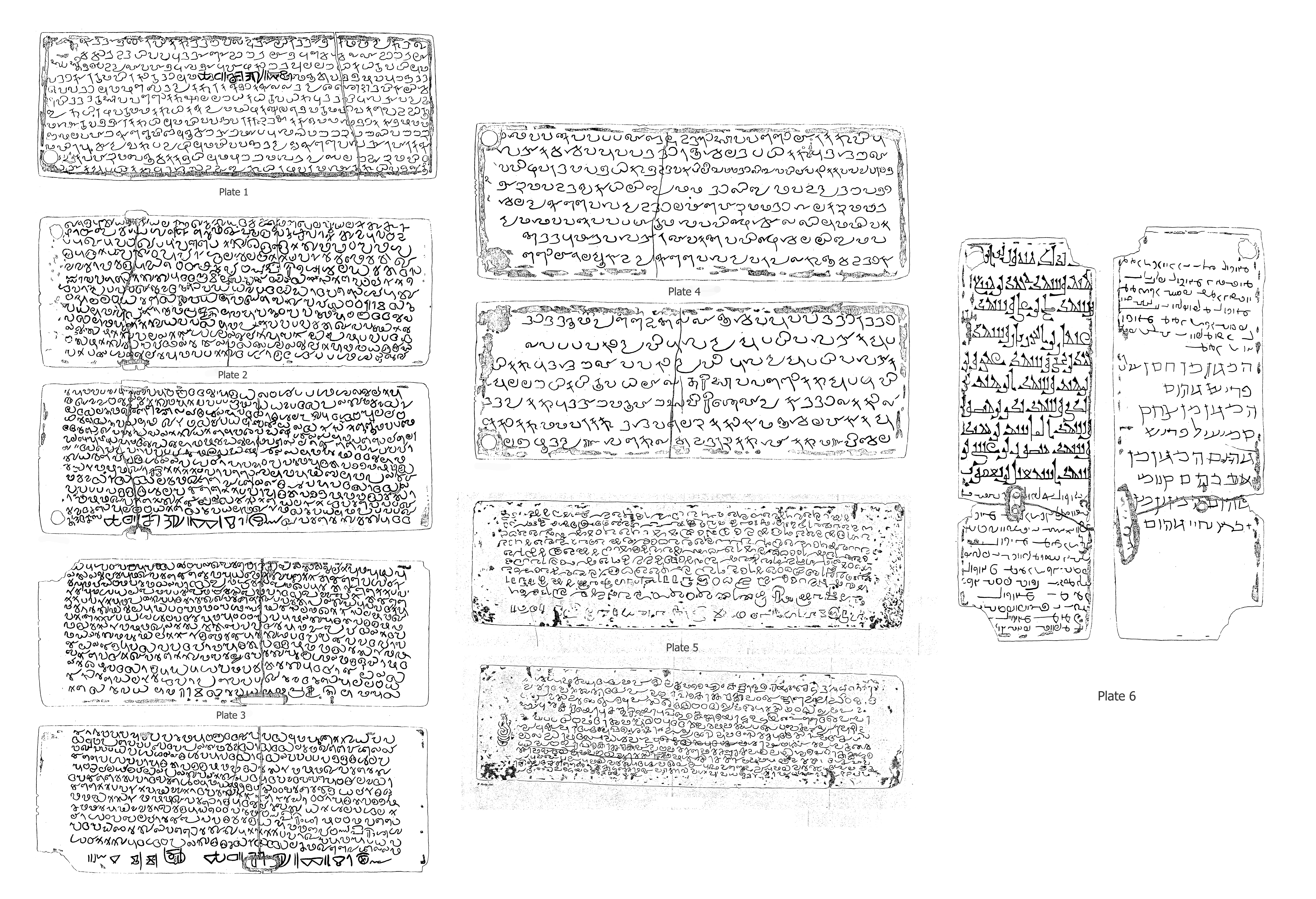
Quilon Syrian Plates shows representation of Manigramam officials.

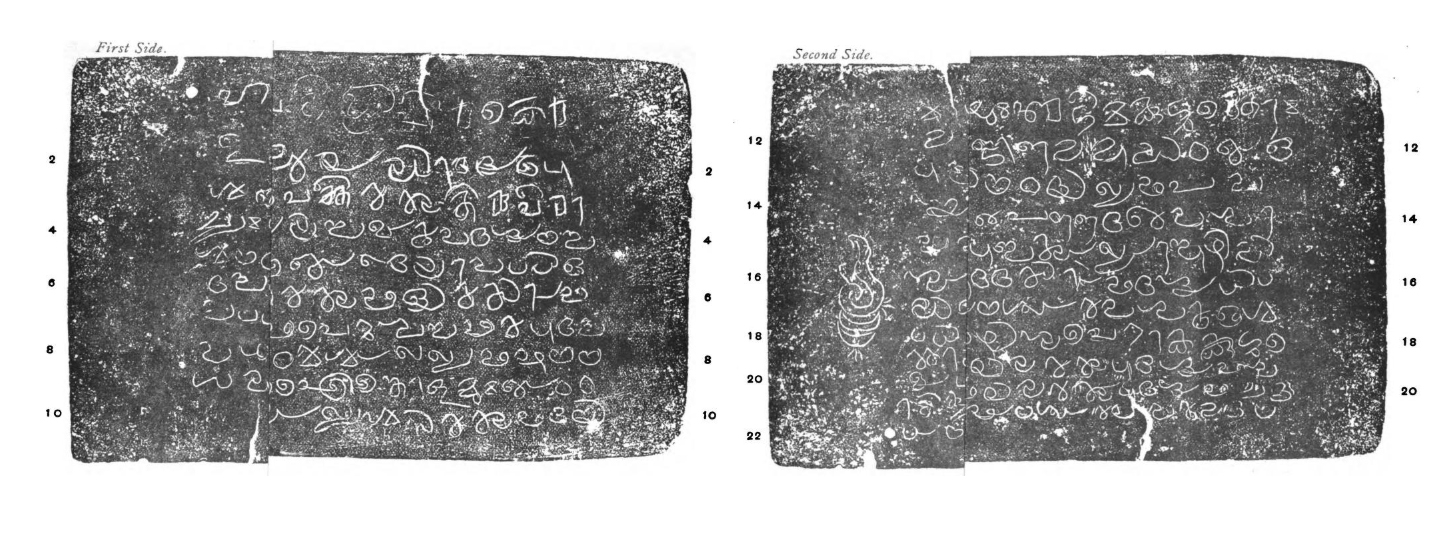
Manigramam, featured in the Viraraghava Copper Plates.

Records of the activities of the manigiramam in southern India can be traced back to the 5th century CE. The earliest references appear in two copper plate grants from south Karnataka (from Melekote, Tumkur and from Hassan district), both datable to the 5th century CE. The Melekote charter records a grant of land to a Buddhist shrine.

The Quilon Syrian copper plates from the 9th century CE also attest to the presence of manigramam representatives. By this time, it appears that the manigramam had become involved in maritime trade and had begun collaborating with the anjuvannam (the anjuman) on the western coast. A Tamil inscription from Takua Pa (9th century CE) in Thailand also references a manigramam guild.

From the early 10th century onward, the ainurruvar (the Ayyavole Five Hundred) emerged as the dominant merchant guild in southern India. The manigiramam and the anjuvannam were later incorporated into this larger organization. By the 12th century CE, the ainurruvar functioned as an umbrella organization encompassing all other merchant guilds. The manigramam was fully subordinated to the Ayyavole by the 13th century.

Hermann Gundert argues that Manigramam gained prominence as a Syrian Christian Principality as evidenced by the concessions received by one Maruwan Sapir Iso & Iravikorttan by native rulers of Kerala.

== Collapse Of Sangam Cheras & Maritime Restructuring ==
Dr Champalakshmi argues that the collapse of the Sangam Cheras and the Kalabhra interregnum caused the breakdown of the older tribal social order and causing the formation of a new institutional order.

^{The decline of the early historic urban centers and long-distance trade with the West (the Roman Empire) after the 3rd century AD led to a period of relative stagnation and a crisis in the tribal-chiefdom structures of the Sangam ruling lineages... This transitional period, often associated with the Kalabhra interregnum, witnessed a breakdown of the older socio-economic order before the emergence of the medieval institutional frameworks."} _{"The early historical trade was characterized by an enclave economy dependent on external demand. When this declined, it led to a restructuring of the internal networks. It is from the remnants of these older exchange centers and specialized market settlements, known as the nagaram, that corporate merchant bodies like the Manigramam emerged, initially operating within specific localized regions before expanding into itinerant, trans-regional networks."}

== Manigramam As Territory (1225 CE) ==
^{"The territory of Manigramam given to Iravi Korttan, the leader of Manigramam guild, extended from Aala (the banyan tree/bazaar) to Gopuram (the gateway/temple tower) in Makotaiyar Pattinam"}

By the 12th Century Manigramam had shifted from a autonomous market Freezone to an entity similar to a modern equivalent of a Microstate. Historian Burton Stein contextualizes that in Medieval Kerala, power was shared between the state and the guild, wherein the Guild had independent international relationships and maintained their own private troops. Opposing Steins views, Historian R. Champakalakshmi notes that the Sovereign Territory and Royal privilege's given to Manigramam was an act of Royal integration rather than independent segmentation, wherein the crown actively won over the loyalty of the regions richest trading guild by bestowing these privileges.

== Periyar River Flood (1341 CE) ==
The cataclysmic flood in the Periyar River basin completely wiped out the ancient port city of Muziris and abruptly ended the Manigramam guild, the surviving guild members and the ecosystem moved to and was absorbed by existing Manigramam infrastructure in Kollam which was previously built.

== See also ==
- Ainurruvar (the Ayyavole Five Hundred)
- Anjuvannam (the Anjuman)
- Kerala
- Saint Thomas Christians
- Quilon Syrian copper plates
- Viraraghava copper plate
- Kollam
- Kodungallur
- Kingdom of Cochin
- Greater India
- History of Indian influence on Southeast Asia
