= Chintapalli, Karempudi =

Chintapalli
- village
- Interactive map of Chintapalli
- Location in Andhra Pradesh, India Chintapalli (India)
- Coordinates: 16.4538633°N 79.7473888°E
- Country: India
- State: Andhra Pradesh
- District: Palnadu

Languages
  - Official: Telugu
- Time zone: UTC+5:30 (IST)
- PIN: 522614
- Telephone code: 08649
- Vehicle registration: AP07
- Climate: hot (Köppen)

Chintapalli is a village and Gram panchayat in Karempudi mandal of Palnadu district, Andhra Pradesh, India. It is located about 5 km from Karempudi mandal revenue office and about 90 km from Guntur.

== History ==
Two inscriptions are found on pillars in front of Dodda Malleshwara temple dating to 1304 AD. These record donations given by the local rulers for the merit of Pratapa Rudradeva, King of Kakatiya dynasty.
