= Fort Vijf Sinnen =

Historical fortification in Nagapattinam

- Part of Dutch Coromandel
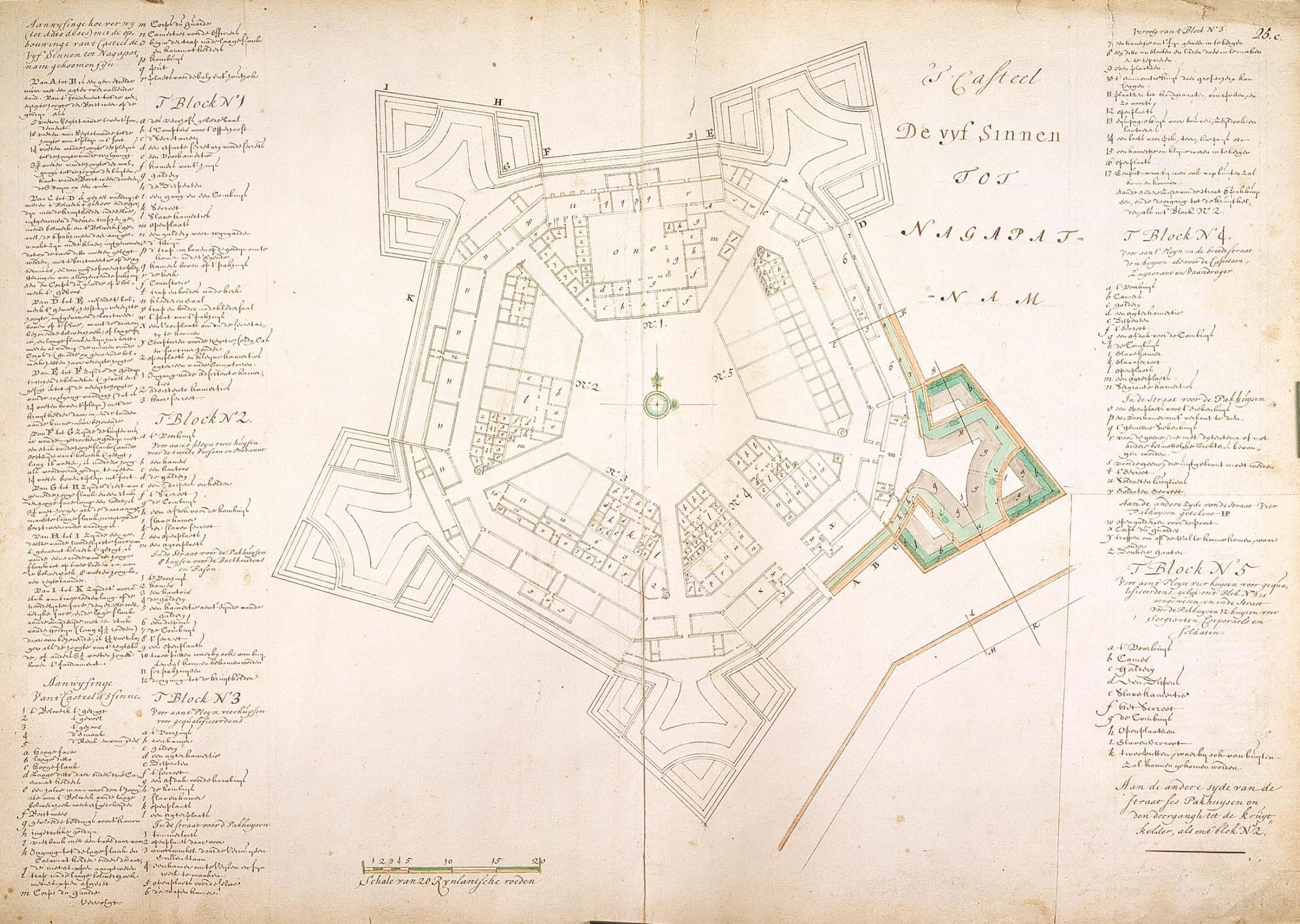
- 18th-c. map of the fort

Location
- Location within Tamil Nadu
- Coordinates: 10.750066°N 79.833439°E

Site history
- Built: 1690
- Built by: Dutch East India Company
- Demolished: Yes

Fort Vijf Sinnen (also Vyf Sinnen, Dutch for "the five senses") was a fortification made by the Dutch East India Company in Nagapattinam, then part of Dutch Coromandel (1610-1798), now Tamil Nadu. The fortification, also described as a castle, was built to protect the interests of the trading company, which shifted the capital of the Coromandel operation from Pulicat to Nagapattinam in 1690, three years after work began on the fort.

The heavily armed fort in the end proved useless in the 1781 Siege of Negapatam, in which the British took the fort. In the Treaty of Paris of 1784 which ended the Fourth Anglo-Dutch War of which this siege was part, Nagapattinam was not restored to Dutch rule, but remained British. The headquarters of the colony shifted back to Pulicat.

== History ==
The Dutch commenced construction of Fort Vijf Sinnen in 1687. It was completed by 1690 and the head quarters of Coromandel was changed here from Fort Geldria at Pulicat. The Portuguese had established a trading post at Nagapatnam in 1554, which they ceded to the VOC under a 1676 treaty with the Thanjavur kingdom.

In November 1780, soon afterward, during the Fourth Anglo-Dutch War, Vice‑Admiral Sir Edward Hughes imposed a naval blockade on Nagapatnam to cut off the VOC’s Coromandel outposts. By January 1781, General Sir Eyre Coote had disembarked some 4,000 troops from Madras and entrenched siege lines around Fort Vijf Sinnen, deploying 12‑ and 18‑pounder artillery against its brick‑and‑earth ramparts. The fort’s defences, originally intended for trade protection rather than sustained bombardment, rapidly crumbled under heavy fire, and by 11 February the walls had been breached in multiple sectors. That evening Governor Reynier van Vlissingen surrendered with 88 guns and approximately 300 soldiers, marking the collapse of Dutch military power on India’s southeast coast until the 1784 peace settlement. Under the 1784 Treaty of Paris, Nagapatnam remained in British hands and the VOC’s Coromandel capital reverted to Pulicat.
