= Henricus Franciscus von Söhsten =

Opperhoofd of Dutch Coromandel
- In office 24 January 1824 – 1 June 1825
- Monarch: William I
- Governor General: Godert van der Capellen
- Preceded by: F. C. Regel
- Succeeded by: position abolished

Personal details
- Born: 23 September 1792 Colombo, Dutch Ceylon
- Died: 28 October 1844 (aged 52) Madras, British India
- Spouse: Anna Pochont

Henricus Franciscus von Söhsten, later anglicized to Henry Francis von Söhsten (23 September 1792 – 28 October 1844) was the last opperhoofd of Dutch Coromandel between 1824 and 1825.

== Biography ==
Henricus Franciscus von Söhsten was born in Colombo on Dutch Ceylon to Henricus Volraad von Söhsten and Dorothea Henrietta Diedericks. He was baptised in Wolvendaal Church on 23 September 1792. His father and grandfather had been employees of the Dutch East India Company and Henricus Franciscus was destined to follow in their footsteps. After Ceylon was transferred to the British in 1796, the Von Söhsten family ended up on the Coromandel Coast.

Under the terms of the Anglo-Dutch Treaty of 1814, Dutch Coromandel was to be restored to Dutch rule, and a commission under the leadership of Jacob Andries van Braam was installed by the Dutch East Indies government on 28 June 1817 to effect the transfer of the Dutch possessions on the Indian subcontinent. After having secured the transfer of the Dutch possessions in Bengal first, Van Braam arrived on the Coromandel Coast in January 1818 and was handed over the Dutch possessions on 31 March 1818 at Fort Sadras, which after the destruction of Fort Geldria in 1804 became the new capital of Dutch Coromandel. Van Braam installed F. C. Regel as the new governor of Dutch Coromandel, who now went by the title of opperhoofd.

Von Söhsten's father was installed resident of Palakol by Van Braam and was promoted to resident of Tuticorin on 28 June 1820, where he died in office on 21 January 1824. Henricus Franciscus himself was installed first secretary at Sadras, where he made a favourable impression on opperhoofd F. C. Regel. He was promoted to resident of Jaggernaikpoeram on 1 June 1820. When Regel became severely ill in October 1823, he transferred his duties to an acting council of three men, and stipulated that in the event of his death, Von Söhsten was to become the new opperhoofd. Regel died on 27 November 1823, and Von Söhsten was swiftly informed of the decision to appoint him as the new head of the colony. By letter of 12 December 1823, Von Söhsten initially declined to accept his new position, as he was not sure of the legality of the procedure, since the decision was made without the consent of the superiors in Batavia. Von Söhsten was then summoned to Sadras, and accepted the office of opperhoofd on 24 January 1824.

Von Söhsten did not remain in office for long, as the Dutch conceded to relinquishing all their possessions on the Indian subcontinent in return for control over Bencoolen in the Anglo-Dutch Treaty of 1824. This meant that the Dutch possessions in Coromandel were to become British again. Even though the treaty stipulated that the transfer should take place on 1 March 1825, Von Söhsten declined to hand over Sadras to the British due to lack of instruction from Batavia. The instructions eventually arrived on 9 May 1825, and on 1 June 1825, the Dutch flag was lowered for the last time on Fort Sadras, and the possession was officially transferred to the British officer Brooke Cunliffe.

Von Söhsten remained on the Coromandel Coast and died in Madras on 28 October 1844.

== Personal life ==
Henricus Franciscus married Anna ("Nancy") Pochont (1791–1866) from Yanaon in French India, with whom he had six children.
