= Portuguese Negapatam =

Former territory of the Kingdom of Portugal

Portuguese Negapatam Negapatão Portuguesa
- 1642–1658
- Flag
- Status: Territory of the Portuguese Empire
- Religion: Roman Catholicism
- Government: Colonial administration
- King
  - 1642–1656 (first): John IV
  - 1656–1658 (last): Afonso VI
- Captain
- Historical era: Early modern period
  - Established: 1642
  - Siege of Negaptam (1658): 1658
Preceded by	Succeeded by
Thanjavur Nayak kingdom	Dutch Negapatam
- Today part of: India

Portuguese Negapatam (Portuguese: Negapatão Portuguesa) refers to the time period in which the city of Nagapattinam was part of the Portuguese Empire, between 1642 and 1658. It was captured by the Dutch East India Company.

== History ==
In 1498, the Portuguese established direct contact with Asia after Vasco da Gama reached Calicut via the Cape Route.

Portuguese merchants established at Negapatam found a major patron in Sevappa Nayak, who protected them and allowed them to trade in his territory. They carried out major trade operations with Ceylon, while missionaries converted the Paravars of the Fishery Coast.

Portuguese merchants settled in Negapatam in the early 16th century and by the early 1530s there were some forty-odd Portuguese households in the city. Initially the Portuguese were engaged on one hand in the busy coastal commerce in rice to Jaffna and southern Malabar, bringing back areca, timber, cinnamon and pepper, on the other in the export of textiles. In 1543, the Portuguese Crown nominated a captain to govern the city. Relations with local Indian officials were generally friendly. With the advent of the succession crisis in Vijayanagara, the Portuguese captain in Negapatam assumed virtually full authority. Between 1543 and 1642 the status of Negapatam was ambiguous, with the Portuguese de facto controlling the city while considering the Nayak of Tanjore the nominal owner of the territory.

Cesare Federici wrote that Negapatam in 1567 was a "very great city and very populous of Christians of the country and partly gentile. Negapatam was described as a flourishing centre of trade by 1586.

In 1577 the population of Portuguese Negapatam included 60 Portuguese casados ("married men"), 200 Eurasians and 300 Indian Christians. In 1635 there 140 white casados, 360 Topasses casados' and 700 Indian Christians.

By the early 1630 Negapatam had a larger Portuguese population than Portuguese Malacca. A Portuguese settler in Negapatam Domingos de Seixas first informed the viceroy Count of Linhares at Goa that Hughli had been taken by the Mughals in 1632. By 1630 resident Portuguese merchants established in Negapatam, São Tomé de Meliapor and the Coromandel Coast pioneered regular trade between the Philippines and Indonesia. In 1646 they landed 300 bales of cloth at Makassar compared to the combined total of 400 bales landed by the Danish East India Company and the English East India Company. Unable to compete with the Portuguese, the English shifted focus to Surat.

On April 12, 1642, the Dutch East India Company attacked the city and extracted a heavy tribute. A naval battle between the Portuguese and the Dutch took place whereby the Dutch were forced to withdraw. Facing increasing attacks by the VOC, in 1642 the Portuguese Viceroy of India struck a deal with the Nayak of Tanjore whereby Negapatam was ceded to the Portuguese Empire and officially annexed. Only then was the city walled, a fort built and a garrison established. At this time it boasted 7000 inhabitants.

The city was sieged and captured by the Dutch VOC in 1658. Although a minor episode, it symbolized the ascendency of the Dutch in Coromandel. In 1661, the Dutch VOC was granted the income of the ten villages formerly owned by the Portuguese in Negapatam.

After Negapatam was taken by the Dutch, the Portuguese moved to Porto Novo, or "New Port". In 1665, the Portuguese Viceroy wrote to the Danish established at Fort Dansborg in Tranquebar requesting that they provide shelter to the Portuguese fleeing from Negapatam after it was occupied by the Dutch.

== See also ==
- Portuguese India
- Dutch Coromandel
  - Fort Vijf Sinnen
- Christianity in India
  - Saint Thomas Christians
