= Siege of Negapatam =

1781 siege of the Fourth Anglo-Dutch War

Coordinates: 10°46′34.73″N 79°50′22.94″E

- Part of the Fourth Anglo-Dutch War and the Second Anglo-Mysore War
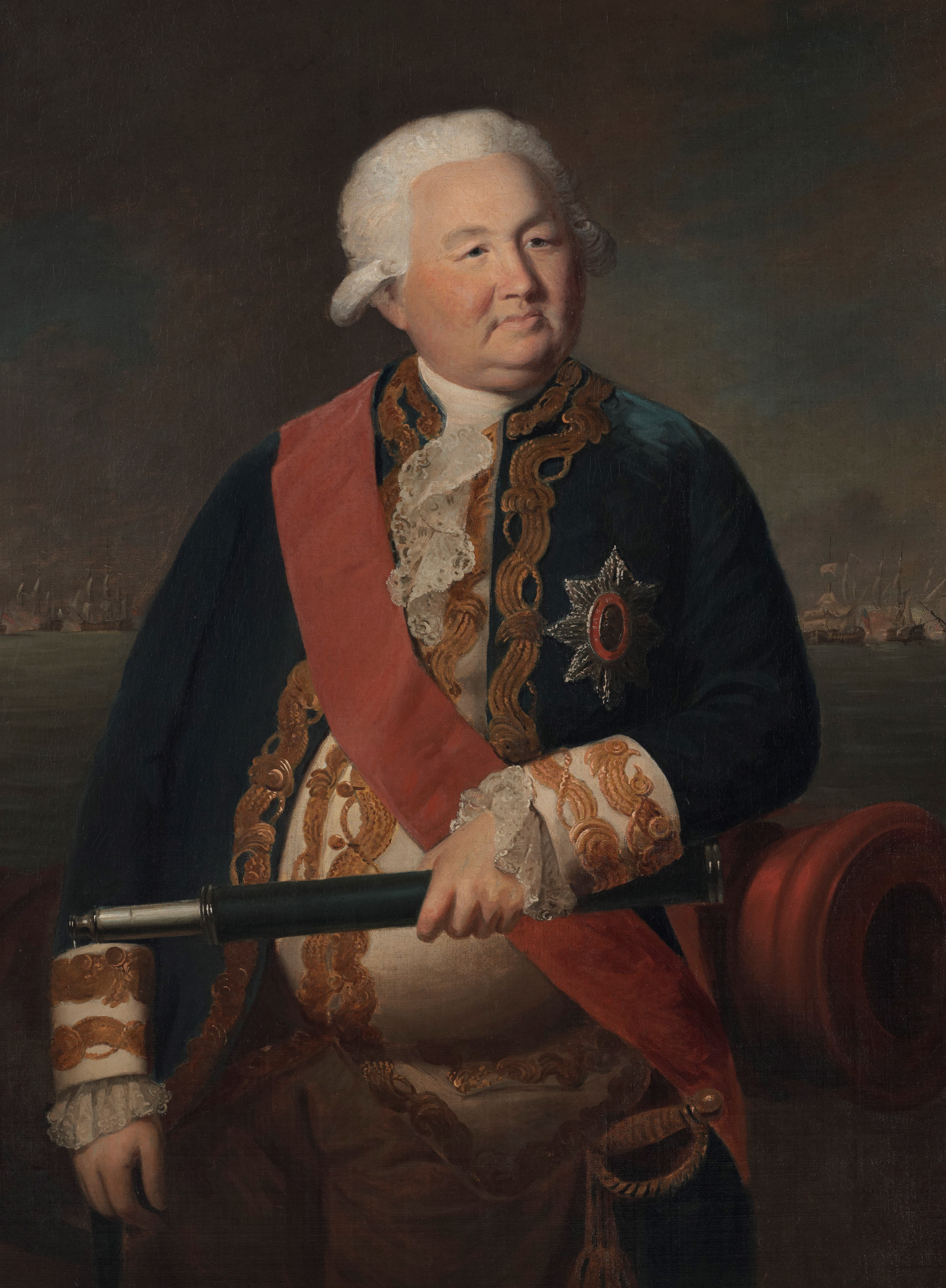
- A portrait of Edward Hughes
Date	21 October – 11 November 1781 (3 weeks)
Location	Negapatam, Dutch Coromandel
Result	British victory

Belligerents
Great Britain	Dutch Republic; Sultanate of Mysore

Commanders and leaders
Hector Munro; Edward Hughes	(Dutch Republic) Reynier van Vlissingen; Hyder Ali

Strength
4,000 troops	6,100 Dutch colonial troops: 600 Dutch; 5,500 Indian sepoys; 2,100 Mysorean troops

Casualties and losses
Light	Unknown killed/wounded thousands captured

The siege of Negapatam was the first major offensive military action on the Indian subcontinent following the arrival of news that war had been declared between Great Britain and the Dutch Republic, beginning the Fourth Anglo-Dutch War. A British force besieged the Dutch-controlled port of Negapatam, the capital of Dutch Coromandel, on the eastern coast of India, which capitulated after the fortification's walls were breached. The Dutch garrison consisted of 500 European troops, 5,500 local troops, and 2,000 troops of Hyder Ali, the ruler of Mysore.

While many British troops were occupied with fighting Hyder Ali's armies as part of the Second Anglo-Mysore War, and General Eyre Coote was opposed to offensive actions against the Dutch, Lord Macartney, the governor of Madras, was able to raise more than 4,000 troops and secure the assistance of Admiral Sir Edward Hughes to defeat the larger Dutch and Mysorean defence force.

== Background ==
Following French entry into the American War of Independence in 1778, Great Britain had moved rapidly to gain control over French colonial outposts in India. Their seizure of the French port of Mahé on the west coast in 1779 prompted Hyder Ali, the de facto ruler of the Kingdom of Mysore, who claimed the port to be under his protection, to open the Second Anglo-Mysore War against British holdings in southern India. He made strong initial gains, with his troops occasionally threatening the main British outpost of Madras on the east coast. By the start of the 1781 monsoon season, the British and Mysoreans were at an uneasy stalemate.

In December 1780 Britain declared war on the Dutch Republic, citing Dutch trafficking in arms in support of the French and American rebels as one of the reasons. While this news reached some of the Dutch colonial governors in India early in 1781, it did not reach Governor Reynier van Vlissingen at the main outpost of Negapatam until rumors of war became widespread, and Iman Willem Falck, the governor of Trincomalee, notified him in June of the war declaration.

The relationship among the Dutch at Negapatam, the British, and the Mysoreans was at the time quite fluid. Hyder's forces had been raiding villages near Negapatam early in 1781, and van Vlissingen, in an attempt to collect damages from Hyder, had instead been forced to pay ransom to release the envoys he had sent to Hyder's camp at Tanjore after Hyder not only refused to release them, but also made verbal threats concerning the Dutch outposts at Pulicat and Sadras. Van Vlissingen had received offers of assistance from General Eyre Coote, the British commander at Madras during these negotiations.

In the summer of 1781, Lord Macartney arrived to take over as governor of Madras, brought news to the British outpost of the new war, and mobilised British troops to gain control over Dutch possessions in India and Ceylon. Van Vlissingen, when he learned of the war, immediately negotiated an alliance with Hyder, which was agreed on 29 July (although it was not formally ratified until 4 September).

== Prelude ==
Van Vlissingen at first sent 600 men, as well as gunpowder and ammunition, to Hyder's camp at Tanjore in early August 1781. However, the rising threat of a British move against Negapatam prompted the allies to instead consider building up its defences. The Dutch 600 returned to Negapatam in late September with 2,100 Mysoreans, and established a defensive line outside the city's walls, which were also defended by a mixed army composed mostly of local sepoys, along with some European and Malay troops.

Most of the British forces on India's east coast were occupied by Hyder's actions, and General Coote was not agreeable to releasing significant forces from that effort. Lord Macartney secured the services of Hector Munro, who was preparing to retire to England, and was able to convince Colonel John Braithwaite, whose troops were active to the south of Madras, to release his men for action against the Dutch outposts. Braithwaite, who had been recently wounded, sent men under Colonel Eccles Nixon toward Negapatam, while Munro's force was carried there by the fleet of Admiral Sir Edward Hughes. On 20 October Nixon seized the Dutch outpost at Karikal, and the next day took control of Nagore, a Dutch outpost that had been under Hyder's control. That same day Hughes's fleet arrived and delivered Munro and his army.

== Siege ==
Munro's first moves were attempts by relatively small detachments to gain control over some of the redoubts on the outer lines of defence. On 27 and 28 October two such attacks against a redoubt on the west side of the line were repulsed. After sending one of Hughes's ships to reconnoiter the defences to the east, a third attack on a redoubt there succeeded on 30 October. According to Dutch reports, this battle resulted in most of the Mysorean cavalry fleeing the scene, and most of the remaining Dutch forces withdrew within the town's walls.

From that point Munro began digging siege trenches on 1 November, and construction of a forward battery began on 5 November. That night, the Dutch made a sortie in an attempt to disrupt the works, but the battery of eight cannon was completed the next day, and opened fire on 7 November, doing significant damage to the town's northern walls. A second Dutch sally on 10 November also failed to disrupt the siege.

Dutch requests to Hyder Ali for reinforcements had been made. On 28 October Hyder had sent another detachment of troops toward Negapatam. These reached Kuttur, about one day's march west of Negapatam, on 8 November, and van Vlissingen urged them to attack the British. However, they were reluctant to do so, given the large number of British troops, and asked Hyder for additional troops from Tanjore. These arrived on 10 November, but Munro seized the initiative and attacked the Mysoreans before they were prepared for battle, forcing them to retreat. A third wave of Mysorean reinforcements neared Negapatam on 13 November, only to learn the town had already surrendered.

Van Vlissingen held a council of war after the failed sally on the night of 10 November, in which it was revealed that the town had but one day's supply of gunpowder left; the council voted for surrender, and raised the white flag the next day.

== Aftermath ==
Negotiations over the terms of capitulation were finalized on 12 November and the garrison surrendered that day. The Dutch held an inquiry into the defeat, which highlighted unusual behavior by van Vlissingen during the siege: he had claimed illness during the later stages of the siege and may have been in some way responsible for the rather abrupt shortage of gunpowder.

Britain went on to capture Trincomalee on Ceylon and other Dutch possessions in India. The British returned them all to the Dutch, except for Negapatam, after the war ended in 1784.

Munro had the Fyrish Monument constructed in Easter Ross in Scotland to represent the gate of Negapatam.
