= Dutch Coromandel =

Former Dutch colony in Coromandel

Coordinates: 13.4177°N 80.3185°E

Dutch Coromandel Coromandel
- 1608–1825
- Flag Coat of arms

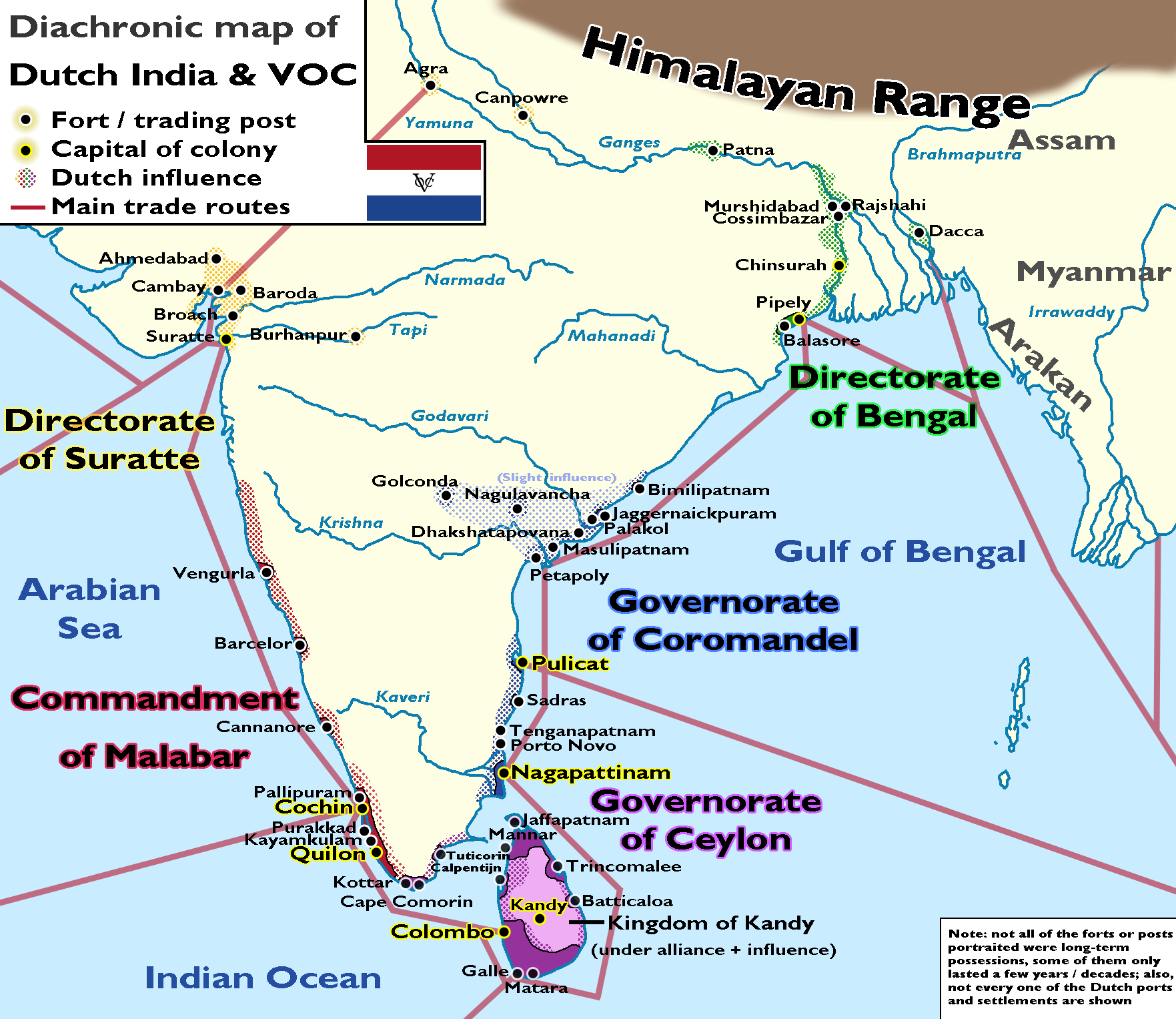
- Dutch Coromandel (in blue) within Dutch India
- Status: Factory
- Capital: Pulicat (1610–1690; 1781–1795); Nagapatnam (1690–1781); Sadras (1818–1825)
- Common languages: Dutch
- Governor
  - 1608–1610: Pieter Issack Eyloff
  - 1636–1638: Carel Reyniersz
  - 1663–1665: Cornelis Speelman
  - 1824–1825: Henry Francis von Söhsten
- Historical era: Imperialism
  - Permission to build a fort in Pulicat: 1608
  - Anglo-Dutch Treaty of 1824: 1 June 1825
Preceded by	Succeeded by
Portuguese India	British India

Coromandel was a governorate of the Dutch East India Company on the coasts of the Coromandel region from 1610, until the company's liquidation in 1798. Dutch presence in the region began with the capture of Pulicat from the Portuguese in Goa and Bombay-Bassein. Coromandel remained a colony of the Kingdom of the Netherlands until 1825, when it was relinquished to the British according to the Anglo-Dutch Treaty of 1824. It was part of what is today called Dutch India.

== History ==
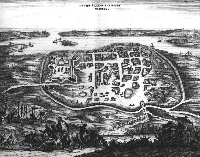
Aerial view of Pulicat, 1656

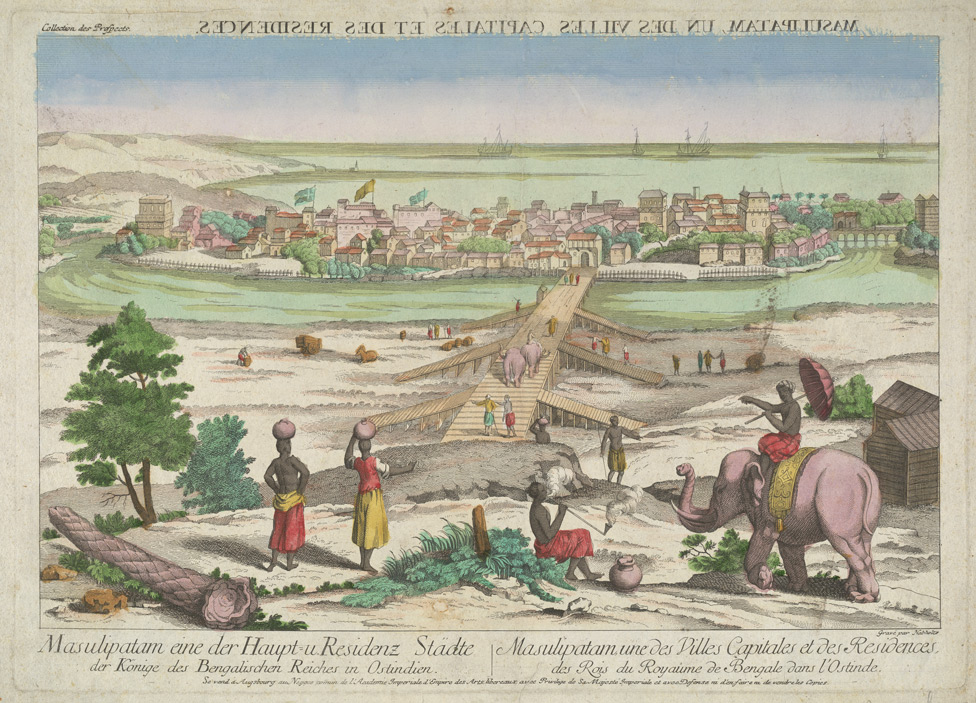
View of Masulipatam in 1676

In 1606, a Dutch ship stopped on the shores of the Karimanal Village near Pulicat, north of the mouth of the lake requesting water. Local Muslims offered food and help to the Dutch. They struck a trade partnership to procure and supply local merchandise to the Dutch for trade in the East Indies.

Empress Eraivi, a wife of Emperor Venkata II of Vijayanagara, ruled Prelaya Kaveri and during her reign in 1608 the Dutch East India Company was given permission to build a fort and do trading. They built a fort named Geldria at Pulicat as a defense from other invading armies' kings and the Portuguese, from where they soon monopolized the lucrative textiles trade with the East Indies and other countries in the region. Under pressure from the Dutch, an English trading post was established in 1619, but this post was disbanded in 1622. The Dutch establishment met with stiff resistance from the Portuguese, who conducted several attacks on the harbor. In 1611, Venkatatapati turned against the Portuguese and the Jesuits were ordered to leave Chandragiri and the Dutch were permitted to build a fort at Pulicat.

The Portuguese tried unsuccessfully to recapture Pulicat in 1614, 1623, and 1633, but never succeeded. From 1616 to 1690, Pulicat was the official headquarters of Dutch Coromandel.

Manufacture of cloth for export was the sole occupation of several indigenous groups in Pulicat and the hinterlands of Tamil, Telugu and Kannada territories, and it is likely that over 1,000 handlooms operated in Pulicat alone. In the 1620s, the Dutch East India Company established a gunpowder factory in Pulicat. Its output was so substantial that for several decades it was able to keep many of the major Dutch trading centers in the East Indies and homeward-bound fleets well supplied. In 1615, the first VOC mint in India was established in Fort Gelria where, initially, "Kas" copper coins with VOC monogram and a Sanskrit legend were minted. The Pulicat mint operated till 1674, when a new mint was established at Nagapattinam. These coins were widely used in Ceylon.

=== The rise and fall of Nagapattinam ===
The headquarters of the colony shifted to Nagapattinam in 1690, after the Dutch had begun working on their Fort Vijf Sinnen three years earlier. The heavily armed fort in the end proved useless in the 1781 siege of Negapatam, in which the British took the fort. In the Treaty of Paris of 1784, which ended the Fourth Anglo-Dutch War of which this siege was part, Nagapattinam was not restored to Dutch rule, but instead remained British. The headquarters of the colony shifted back to Pulicat.

By the early 18th century, Pulicat's population has been estimated to have declined to just over 10,000. In 1746, the monsoon failed, resulting in a devastating famine. In the larger towns of Pulicat and Santhome alone the death toll was put at 15,000 and only one third of the textile weavers, painters and washers survived. Cloth prices increased 15% and little was available even at that price. An even more significant cause of the Dutch decline was conquest of the area by the Golconda forces commanded by Mir Jumla.

=== Occupation by the British, restoration to the Dutch and eventual cession ===
Owing to the Kew Letters written by Dutch stadtholder William V, British troops occupied Dutch Coromandel to prevent it from being overrun by the French. Dutch governor Jacob Eilbracht capitulated to the British on 15 July 1795. In 1804, British forces blew up Fort Geldria.

The Anglo-Dutch Treaty of 1814 restored Dutch Coromandel to Dutch rule. A commission under the leadership of Jacob Andries van Braam was installed by the Dutch East Indies government on 28 June 1817 to effect the transfer of the Dutch possessions on the Indian subcontinent, which arrived on the Coromandel Coast in January 1818. After protracted negotiations, the Dutch possessions were eventually handed over on 31 March 1818, with a ceremonial striking of the Union Jack in Fort Sadras, the new capital of Dutch Coromandel, and a subsequent hoisting of the Dutch flag. F. C. Regel was installed as the new governor of Dutch Coromandel, who now went by the title of opperhoofd. Regel was succeeded in 1824 by the young administrator Henricus Franciscus von Söhsten.

The restoration of Dutch rule did not last long. On 1 June 1825, seven years after the possessions were restored to the Dutch, Dutch Coromandel was again ceded to the British, owing to the provisions of the Anglo-Dutch Treaty of 1824.

Except for two short breaks, Dutch rule of Pulicat lasted for 214 years between 1606 and 1825 till the King of Arcot acceded Chingleput District (which included Pulicat village) to the British in 1825.

== Legacy ==
Pulicat today bears silent testimony to the Dutch, with the Dutch Fort dating back to 1609 in ruins, a Dutch Church and Cemetery with 22 protected tombs dating from 1631 to 1655 and another Dutch Cemetery with 76 tombs and mausoleums protected by the Archaeological Survey of India (ASI). Dutch architects and scholars now intend to support efforts to restore these early Dutch settlements. The Dutch Hospital building in Pulicat dating from 1640 is to be renovated in the near future.

Sadras still features a Dutch fort and a cemetery. Although the remains of Fort Vijf Sinnen and the Dutch cemetery in Nagapattinam have almost completely vanished, the Dutch Saint Peter's Church, Nagapattinam still remains standing. Near Masulipatam, there are remnants of the Dutch-built Bandar Fort and a Dutch cemetery. Bheemunipatnam features two Dutch cemeteries and some remnants of Dutch colonial buildings. Tuticorin, which was governed from Dutch Ceylon until 1796, but became a residency of Dutch Coromandel in 1817 after Ceylon was relinquished to the British, still features the Holy Trinity Church, Tuticorin, built by the Dutch. Porto Novo, there are many grave cemetery which was in use 1686 are remains till now. The Dutch was used till 1730s.

== Forts and trading posts ==
Map of the main forts of the Coromandel Coast in the current Indian state of Andhra Pradesh
Map of the main forts of the Coromandel Coast in the current Indian state of Tamil Nadu

Settlement	Type	Established	Disestablished	Comments
Fort Geldria (Pulicat)	Fort and factory	1613	1825	After having been granted to establish a factory in Pulicat in 1608, the local ruler allowed the Dutch to build a fort in 1613. This Fort Geldria remained the principal Dutch fort on the Coromandel Coast until 1690, when the headquarters changed to Nagapattinam. In 1694, large portions of the artillery were shipped to Nagapattinam, but after the latter's loss to the British in 1781, Fort Geldria was reinstated as the capital of the colony. In 1804, Fort Geldria was blown up by British forces. The town was principal in the supply of cotton for the Dutch.
Fort Vijf Sinnen (Nagapattinam)	Fort and factory	1658	1781	Captured from the Portuguese in 1658, Nagapattinam first fell under Dutch Ceylon. After a devastating flood in 1680, Fort Vijf Sinnen was built from the rubble. This new fort became the capital of Dutch Coromandel, until it was captured by the British in 1781.
Fort Sadras	Fort and factory	1612	1825	First established in 1612, but only in 1654 enlarged into a full factory. In 1749, the Sadras fort was completed. Together with Nagapattinam, it was captured by the British in 1781, but contrary to Nagapattinam, it was given back under the Treaty of Paris (1784). Due to the destruction of Fort Geldria in 1804, Fort Sadras became the capital of Dutch Coromandel in 1818. Sadras was renowned for its high quality cotton, and also supplied bricks for Batavia and Ceylon.
Fort Bheemunipatnam	Fort and factory	1652	1825	The local trading post was enlarged into a fort in 1758. Bheemunipatnam primarily traded in rice, and was fundamental for rice shipments to Ceylon.
Fort Jaggernaikpoeram	Fort and factory	1734	1825	An important textile trading post after the loss of Draksharama and Palakol (see below).
Parangippettai	Factory	1608	1825	The Dutch East India Company settled in 1608 in an old house in Parangippettai, also known as Porto Novo. In 1680 extended into a full factory.
Palakol	Factory	1613	1825	Temporarily abandoned in 1730. Trading post for textile, lamp oil, wood, roof tiles, and bricks.
Masulipatnam	Factory	1605	1756	Masulipatnam was the first Dutch factory on the Coromandel Coast of India. It was eventually abandoned in 1756.
Nizampatnam	Factory	1606	1668	Second Dutch factory on the Coromandel Coast. Abandoned in 1668.
Tenganapatnam	Factory	1609	1758	Established in 1609. In 1647, the permission was given to build a fort here. The primary purpose of the settlement was to spy on the British, who had settled in the same town. Abandoned in favour of Parangippettai (Porto Novo) in 1758.
Golkonda	Factory	1634	1733	Important staple market for the Dutch East India Company. After having only a local tradesman to their service, the Dutch expanded their presence in Golkonda to a full factory in 1664. Due to local unrest, trade began to diminish in the late 17th century. The factory was eventually abandoned in 1733.
Draksharama	Factory	1633	1730	Abandoned in 1730 in favour of Jaggernaikpoeram.
Thiruppapuliyur	Factory	1608	1625	Founded in 1608 on the ruins of an old Portuguese fort. Destroyed in 1625 by a local chief.
Nagulavancha	Factory	1669	1687	Established inland to have better control over the quality of the locally produced products. Destroyed on 13 October 1687 by locals.
Pondicherry	Fort and factory	1693	1699	During the Nine Years' War, the Dutch East India Company laid siege to the French fort of Pondicherry in 1693, whose commander François Martin surrendered on 6 September of the same year. Pondicherry was restored to French rule in 1699, owing to the provisions of the Treaty of Ryswick.

== See also ==
- Dutch Bengal – Directorate of the Dutch East India Company in Mughal Bengal
- Dutch Malabar – Commandment of the Dutch East India Company
- Dutch Ceylon – Dutch colony in Sri Lanka, 1640–1796
- Dutch Suratte – Colonial trading company
