= Fort Geldria =

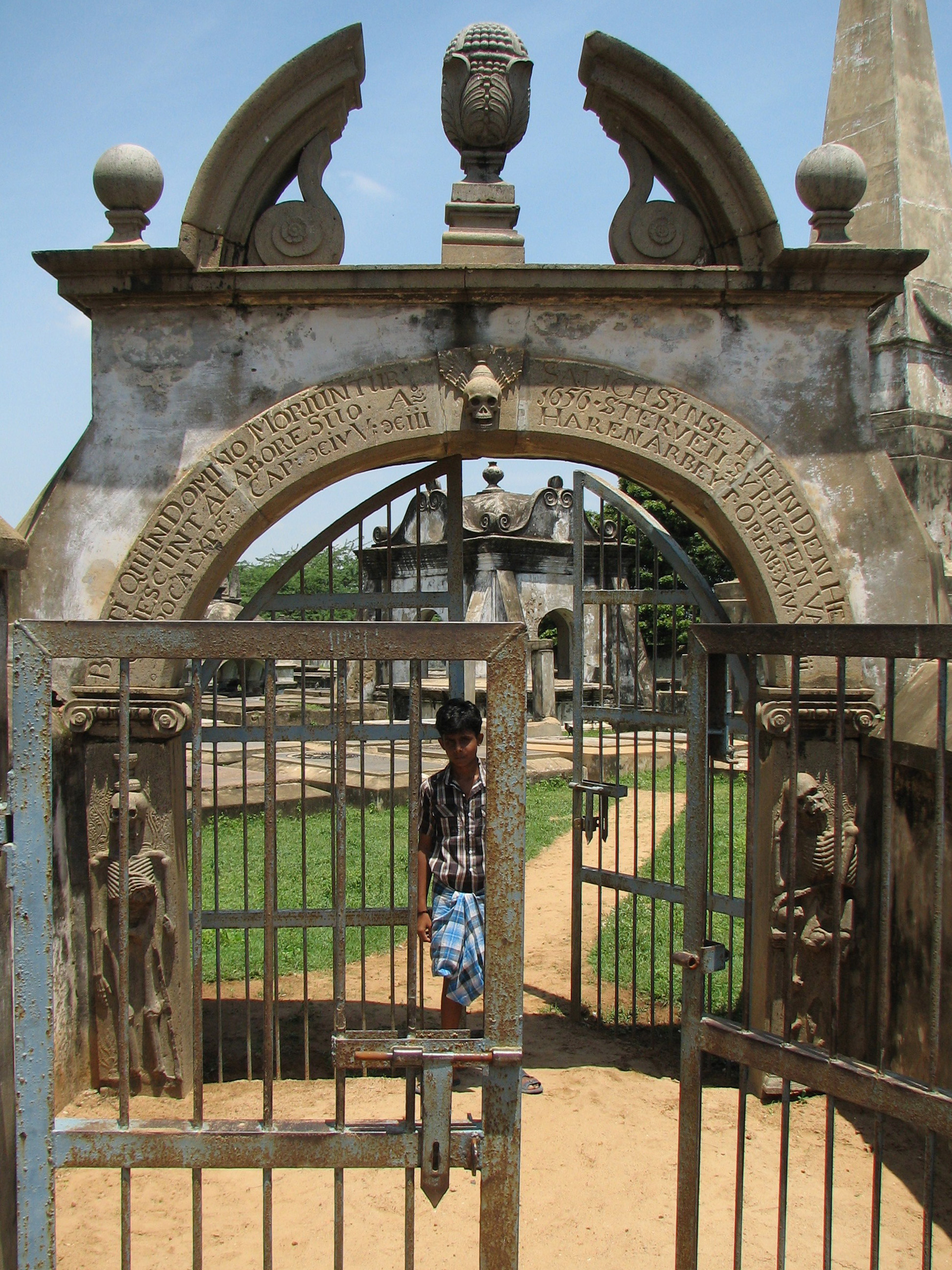

- Location in Tamil Nadu, India
- 13°25′10″N 80°18′59″E
- Location: Chennai, India

Fort Geldria or Fort Geldaria, located in Pulicat, Tamil Nadu, was the seat of the Dutch Republic's first settlement in India, and the capital of Dutch Coromandel. It was built by the Dutch East India Company in 1613 and became the local governmental centre in 1616. It was named for Geldria, the native province of Wemmer van Berchem, the General Director of the company. Regularly protected by a garrison of 80 to 90 men, Fort Geldria was the only fortification in the Indian empire; all other positions of the Dutch Company were trading posts.

== Dutch ownership ==
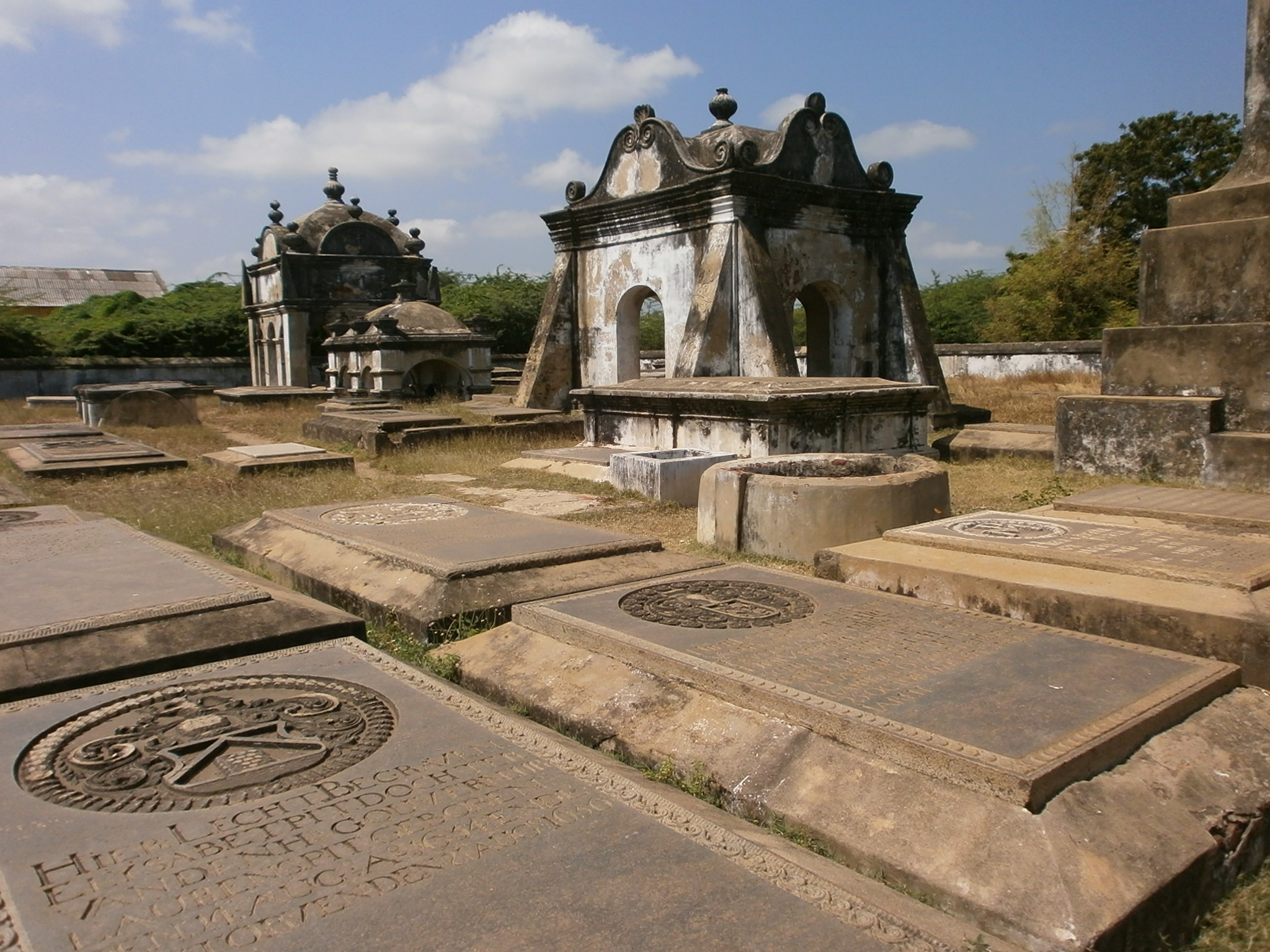
Dutch cemetery in Pulicat

The fort was built on the shores of Pulicat Lake, which provides access to the Bay of Bengal and the Coromandel Coast, an important area for trade and a scene of rivalry between the colonial powers of the Dutch, the Portuguese, and the British. A Portuguese fort had existed previously on the spot, and Fort Geldria was built on its foundations, with the permission of Queen Oboyama, wife of Vijayanagara Emperor Venkatapati Raya, based in Chandragiri Fort, who was supposed to contribute financially and become part-owner. This process, however, proved too slow for the Dutch, and they decided to finance and build it themselves. Local tradition holds that a Dutch ship, stranded in 1606, found aid among a group of expatriate Muslims, and thus began a trade partnership.

Within one month of completion, the fort came under attack from a local chieftain, Etheraja. After he was repulsed, the Portuguese attacked the fort from both land and sea but were fought off. The Dutch formed an alliance with the local traders and the Portuguese were kept at bay. The fort, which was supplied by the Gouden Leeuw in 1618 with 130 Dutch soldiers and 32 guns, became a focal point in the local turmoil and provided refuge to people from the Portuguese colonies. In 1619, the chief at Fort Geldria was accorded the title of Governor and Extraordinary Councillor of the Indies. In the second half of the seventeenth century, the fort's importance as a trading post (it dealt mainly in cotton fabrics) began to decline, due partly to competition with the British but mostly as a result of the southward expansion of the Mughal Empire. By 1689, the government moved to Negapatnam and subsequently to Ceylon.

When the director's seat moved, the fort was left with 18 guns and 40 men. The fort was restored in 1714, and was occupied by the British from 1781 to 1785. Fort Geldria's success as a trading post seems unaffected by the changes of power. In 1786, for instance, caravans loaded with merchandise come in every month from places like Golkonda and Suratte and ships sail in from the Red Sea, Goa, and Malabar; there is a lively trade in cotton fabric and a flourishing industry in the dyeing of textiles. A 1792 description of Dutch trading posts in the East reports trade in sugar, arrack, Japanese copper, and spices. In 1795, the Dutch surrendered the fort to the British and blew it up in 1804 or 1805, before finally giving ownership to the British on 1 June 1825.

== British, Indian ownership ==
The British held the fort from 1825 until Indian independence. Fort Geldria is currently maintained by the Archaeological Survey of India. Plans to restore the fort involve a cooperation between Dutch architects and scholars and the Tamil Nadu government, with financial help from the Dutch and Indian governments. The plans propose a restoration of the wetland eco-system of the area and of the remaining Dutch structures, including the well-preserved cemetery with 76 tombstones carved in the Netherlands.
