= Sadras =

Sadras Sadurangapattinam
- town
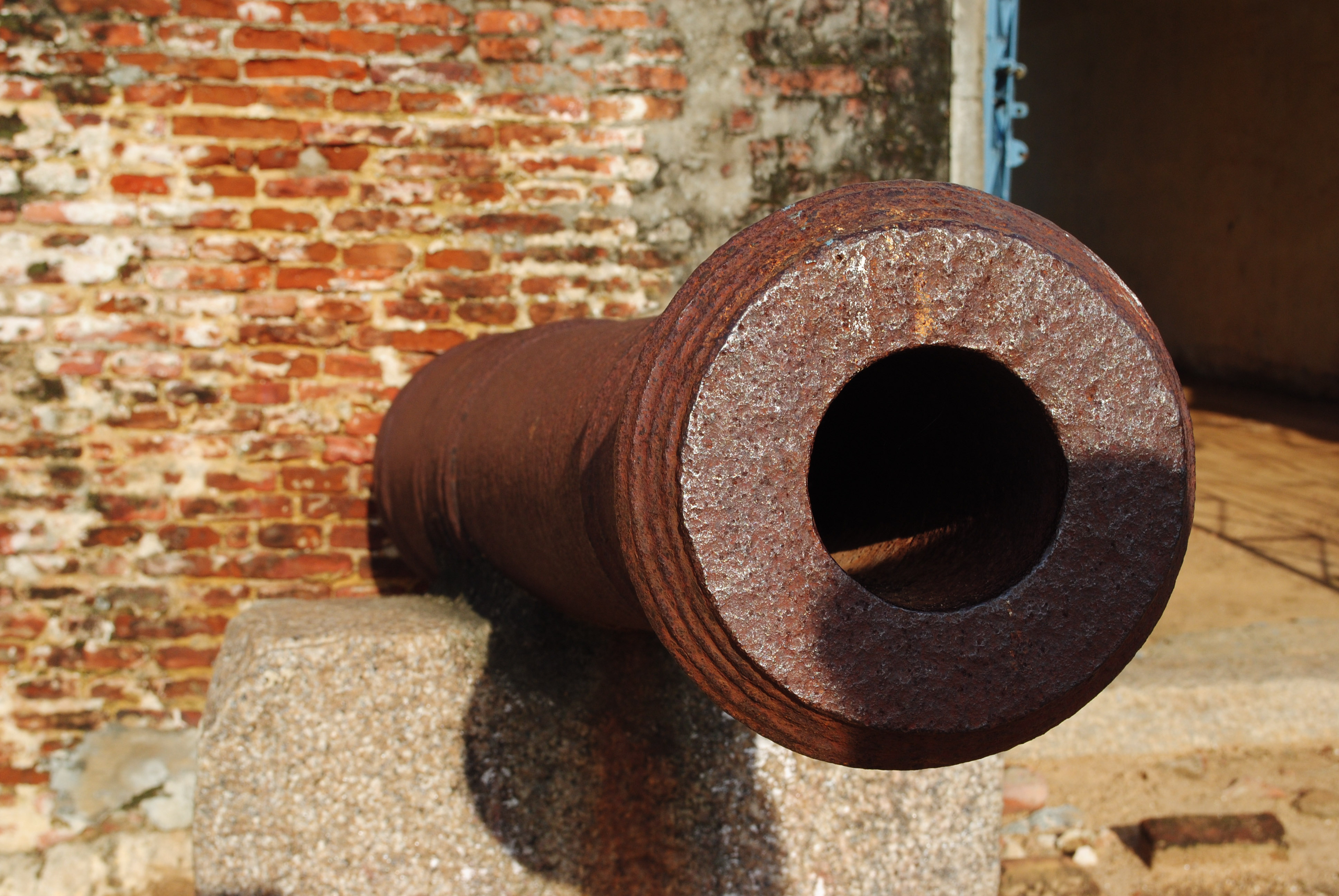
- Cannon inside the Dutch fort at Sadras

- Location within Tamil Nadu
- Coordinates: 12°31′30″N 80°9′44″E
- Country: India
- State: Tamil Nadu
- District: Chengalpattu

Languages
  - Official: Tamil
- Time zone: UTC+5:30 (IST)
- PIN: 603102
- Telephone code: 044

Sadras is a fortress town located on India's Coromandel Coast in Chengalpattu district, 70 km south of Chennai in Tamil Nadu state. Sadras is the anglicised form of the ancient town of Sadurangapattinam.

== History and etymology ==
An inscription found in Sadras dated to 1359 mention this place as Rajanarayanan Pattinam after a Sambuvaraya chieftain. There is a temple to Vishnu here, and because of it later the city was known as Sadiravasagan Pattinam. This later changed into Sadurangapattinam, shortly known as Sadirai. Later the Dutch called it Sadras.

== Dutch fort ==
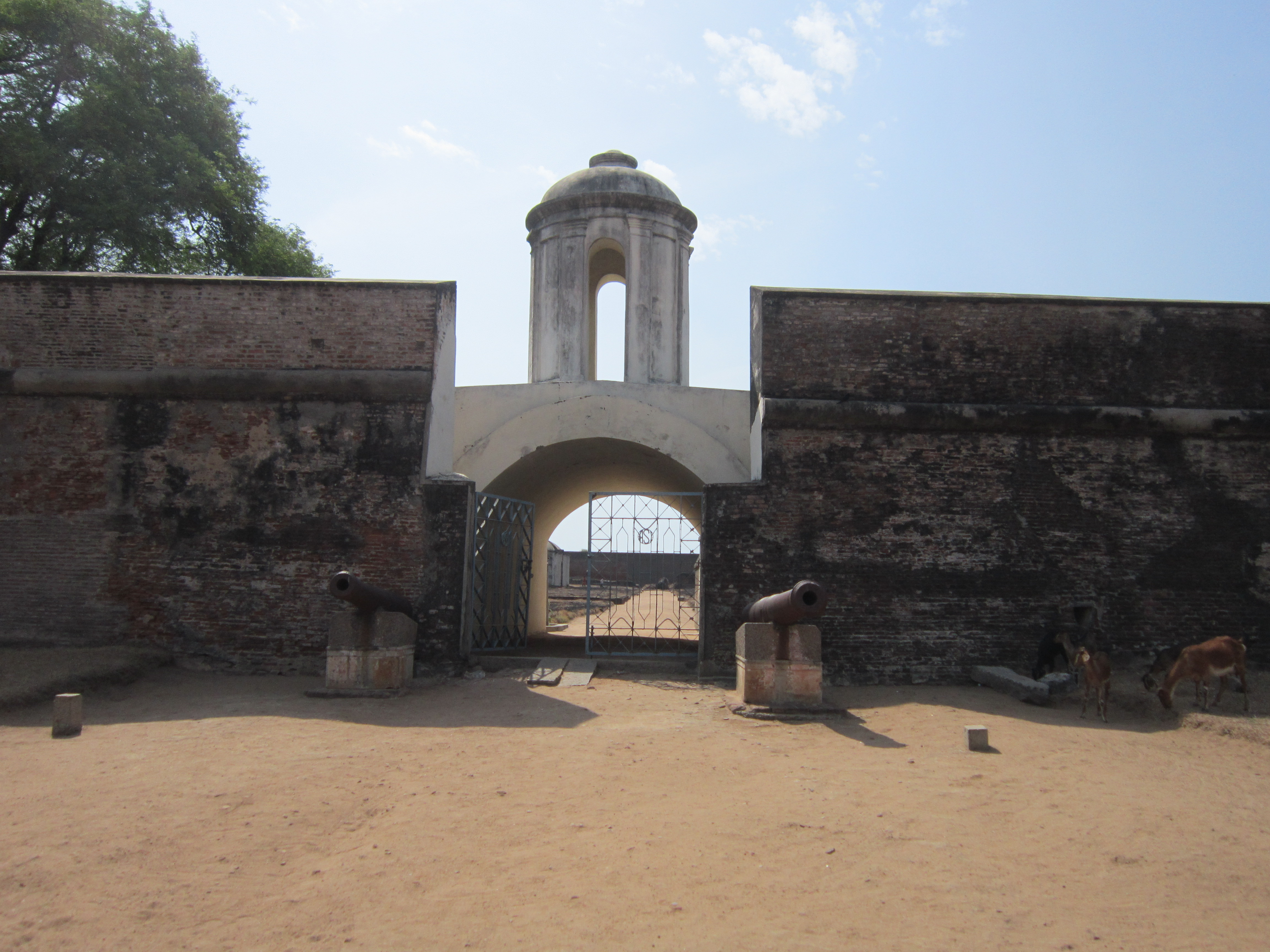
Entrance of Sadras fort

Modern Sadras was established as part of Dutch Coromandel in the seventeenth century, which was even before center for weaving superfine muslin cloth for export besides pearl and edible oil. The magnificent Sadras Fort, built for commercial purposes by the Dutch, is a vast compound enclosing a huge granary, stables, and structures used to mount elephants. Unfortunately, only one of these structures survives. The fortress was raided by the British in 1818 and came under the control of the British East India Company. It is now maintained by the Archaeological Survey of India in efforts to contain further dilapidation. In 2003, a major restoration of the damaged fort was carried out leading to many archaeological findings. The first battle between British East India Company and the Dutch started here as Battle of Sadras. The fort includes a cemetery with many beautifully decorated graves that date to between 1620 and 1769.

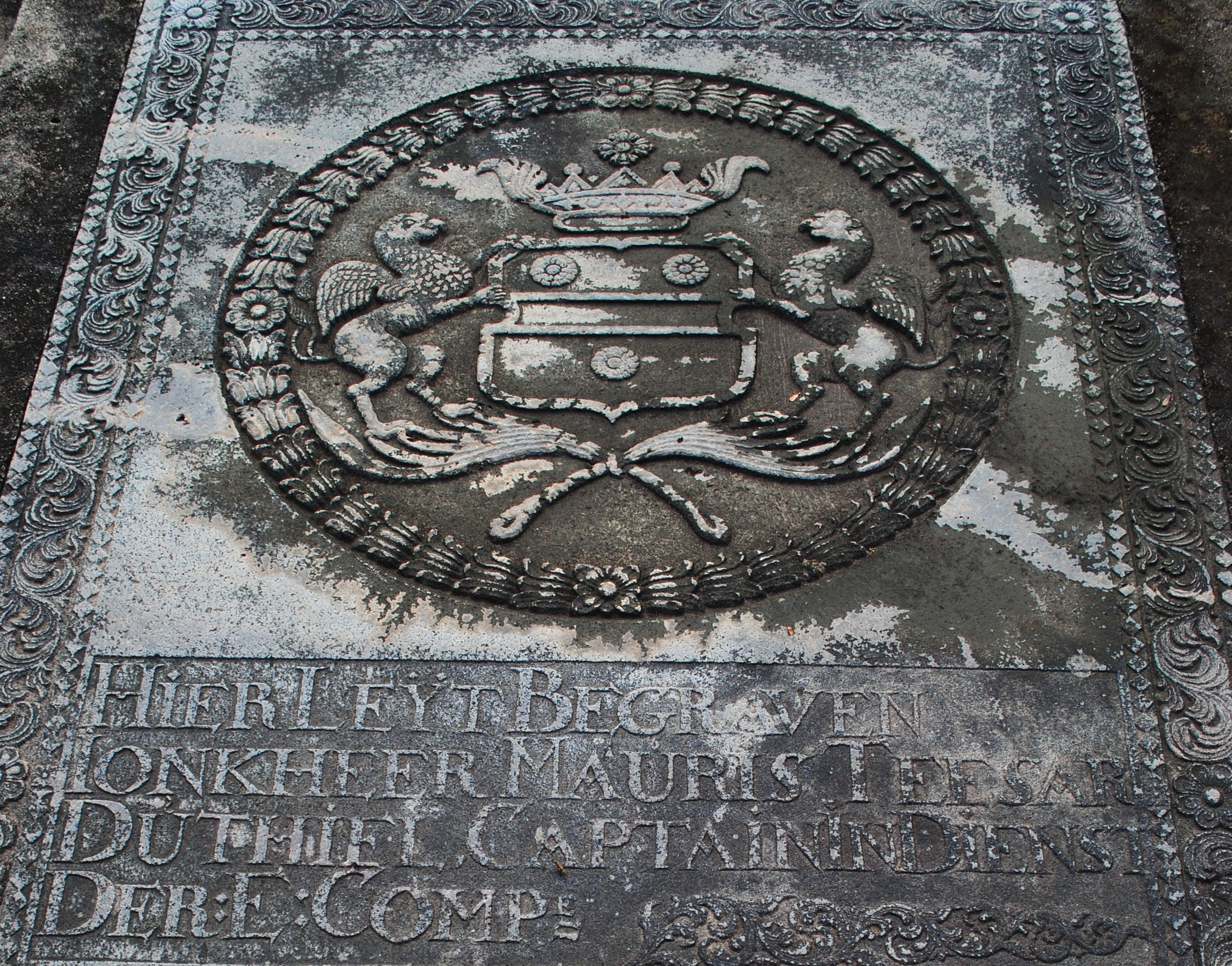
A tomb inside the fort with coat of arms

== Location ==
In recent times, Sadras has found mention due to its proximity to the atomic power plant (Madras Atomic Power Station) and the atomic research centre (Indira Gandhi Centre for Atomic Research – IGCAR) both located at nearby Kalpakkam. The village of Sadras is sandwiched between the power plant and its township. There are two bridges connecting Kalpakkam and Sadras.

== Gallery ==
The Sadras fort also contains picturesque tombs.

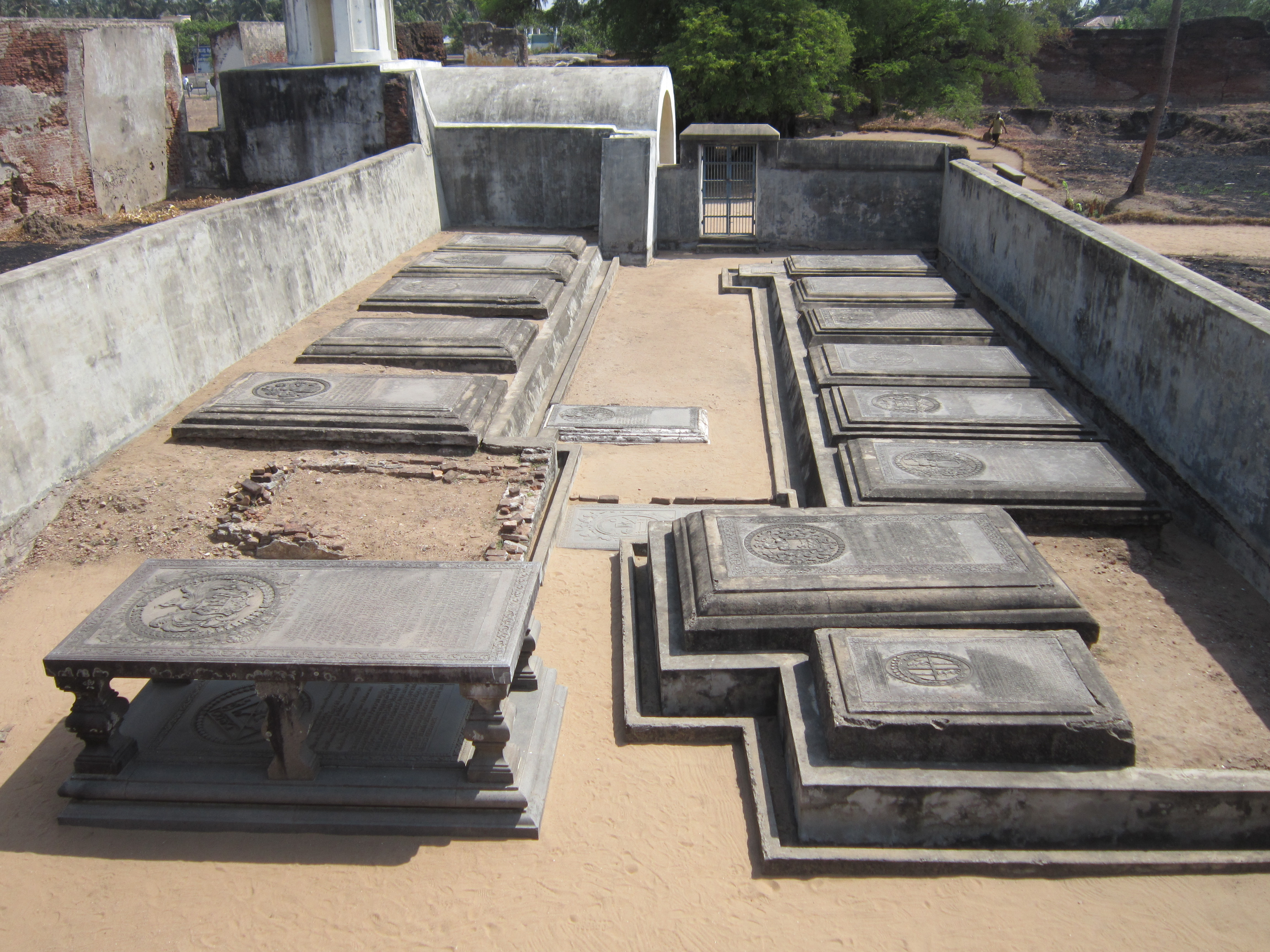

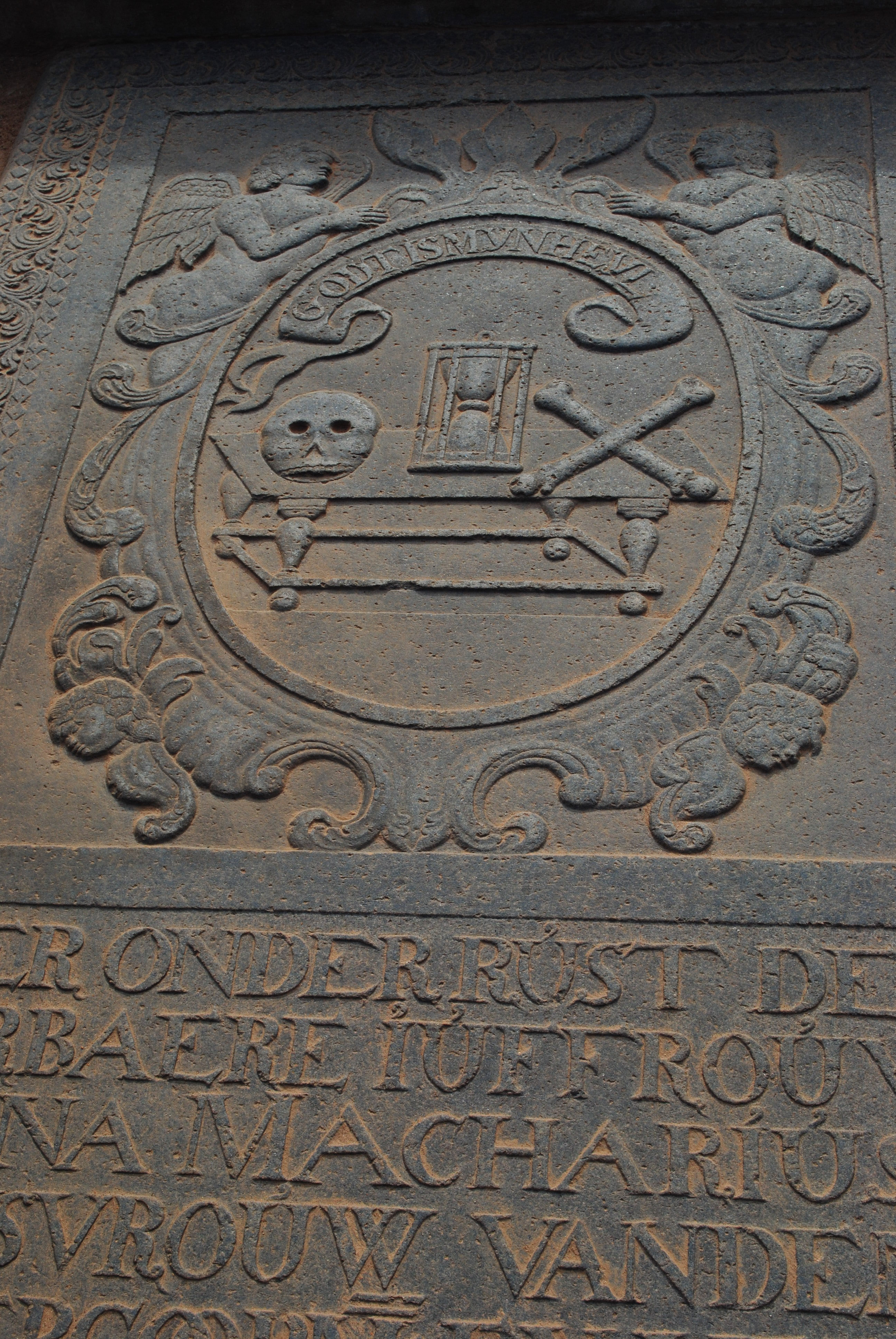

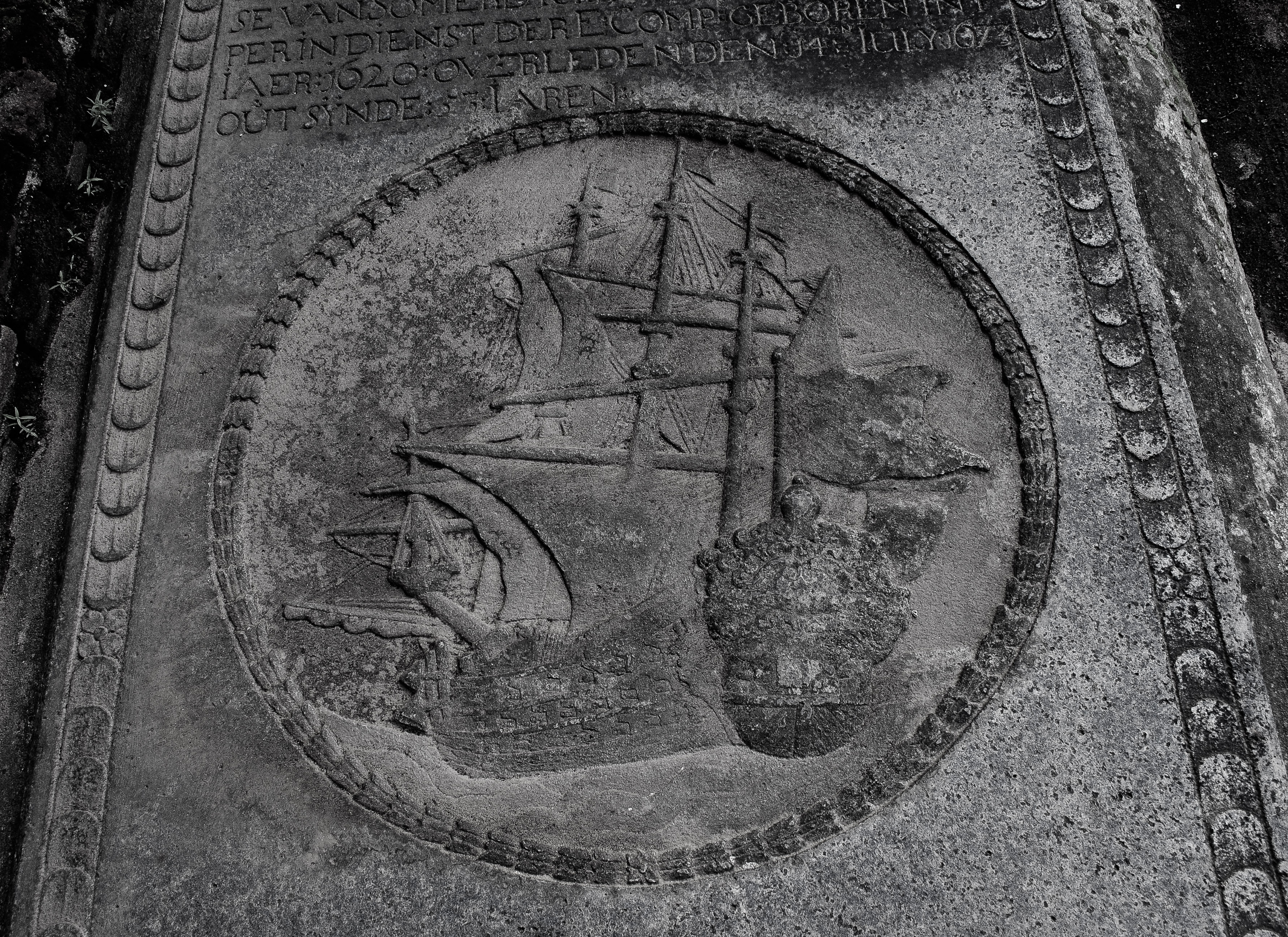

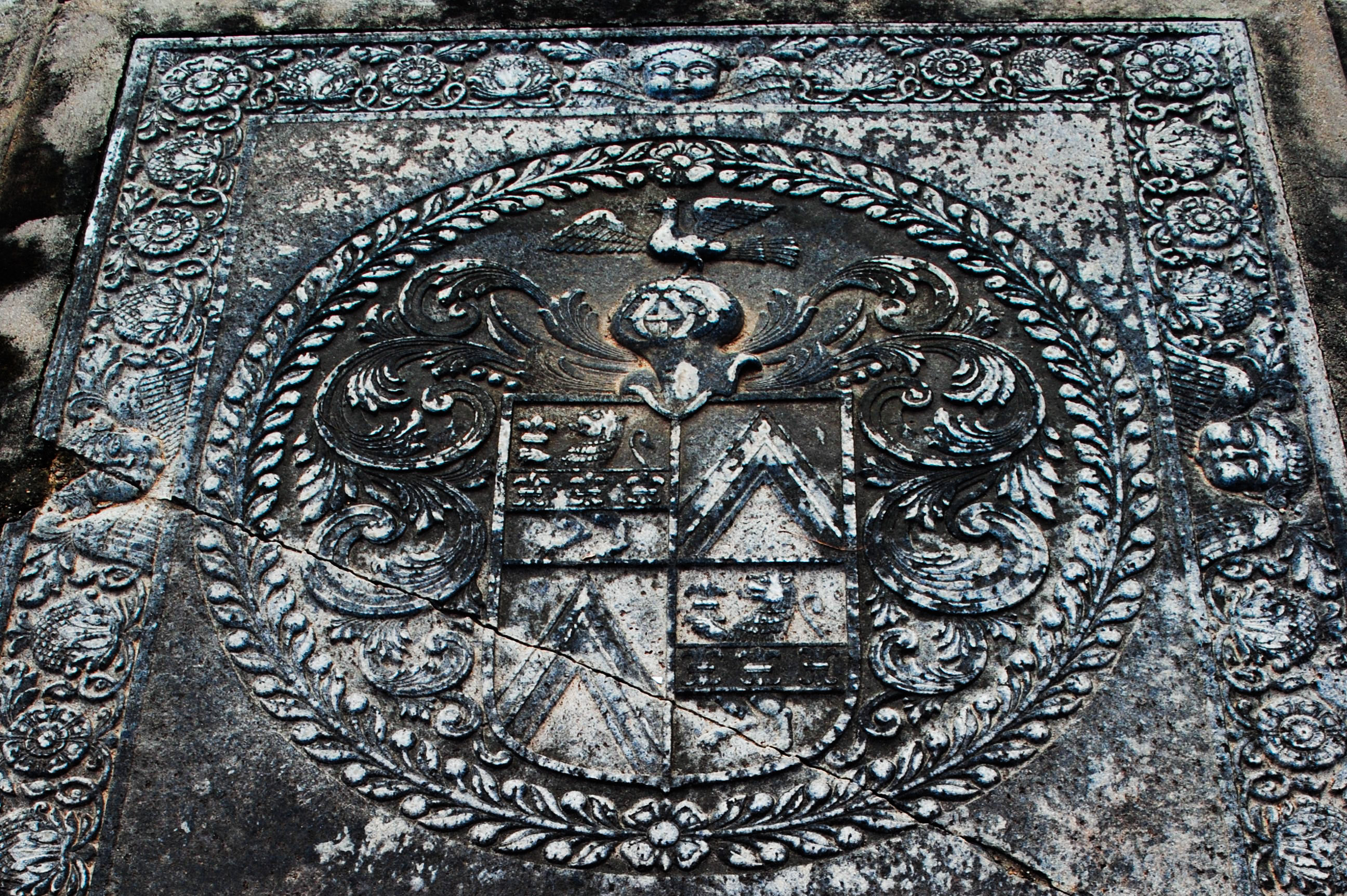

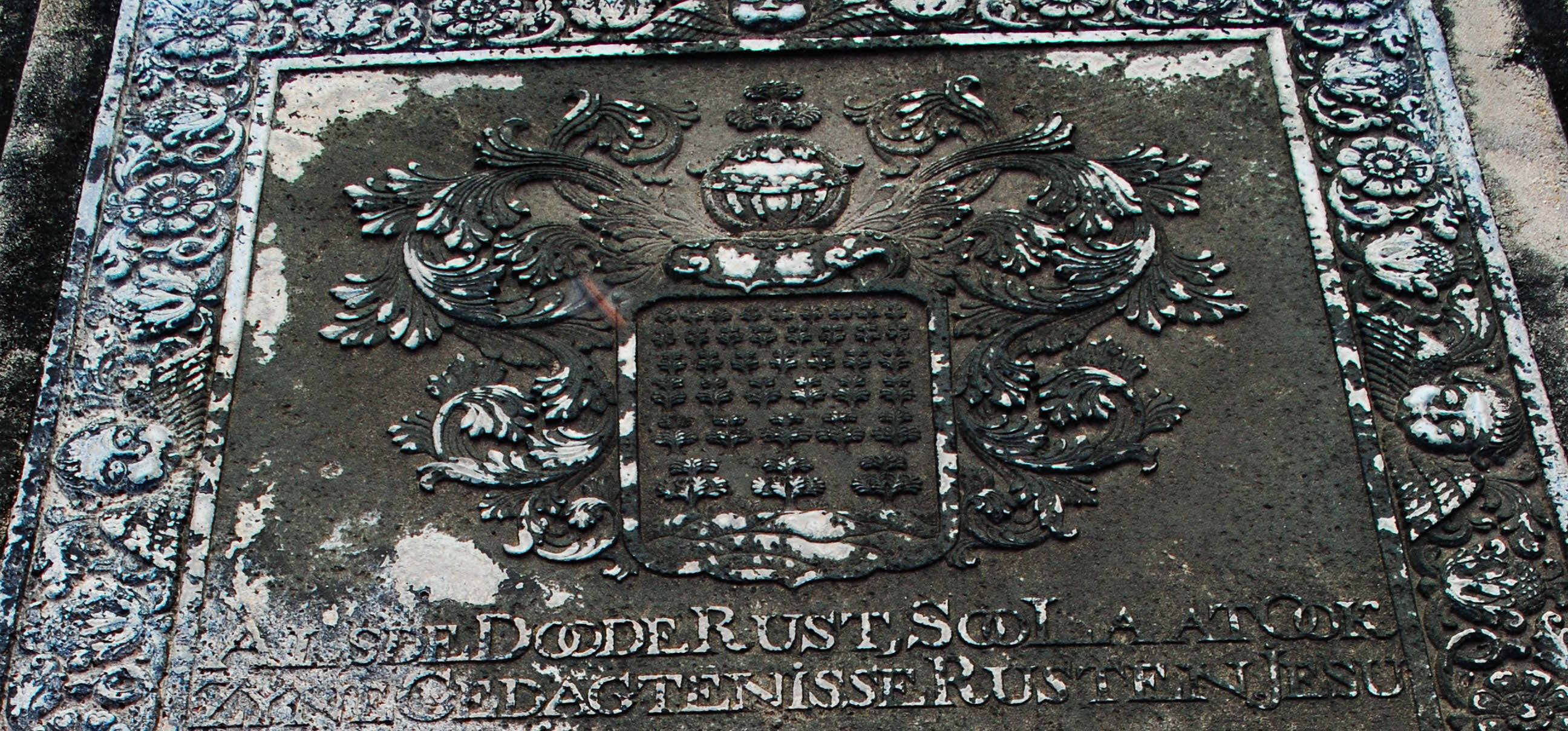

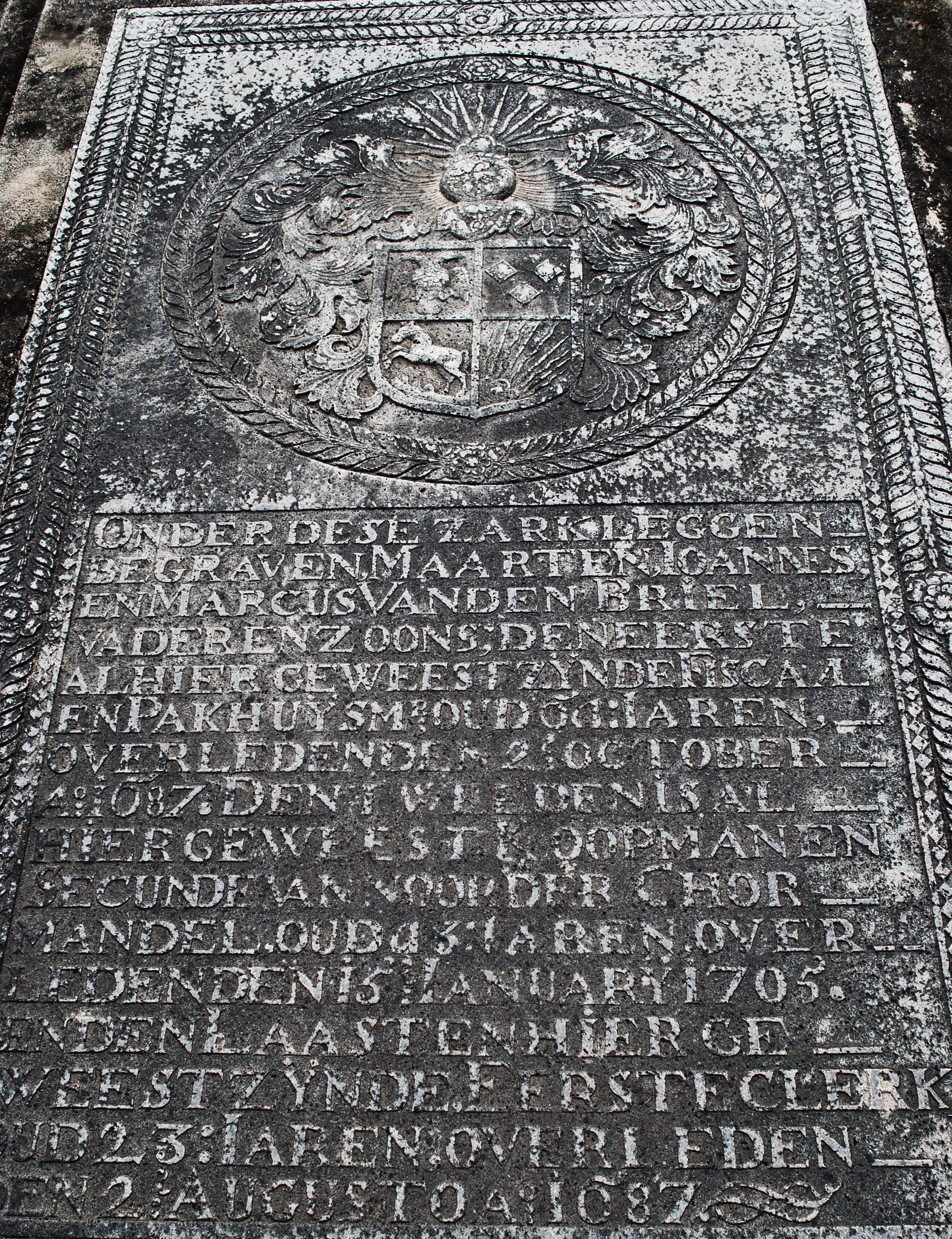

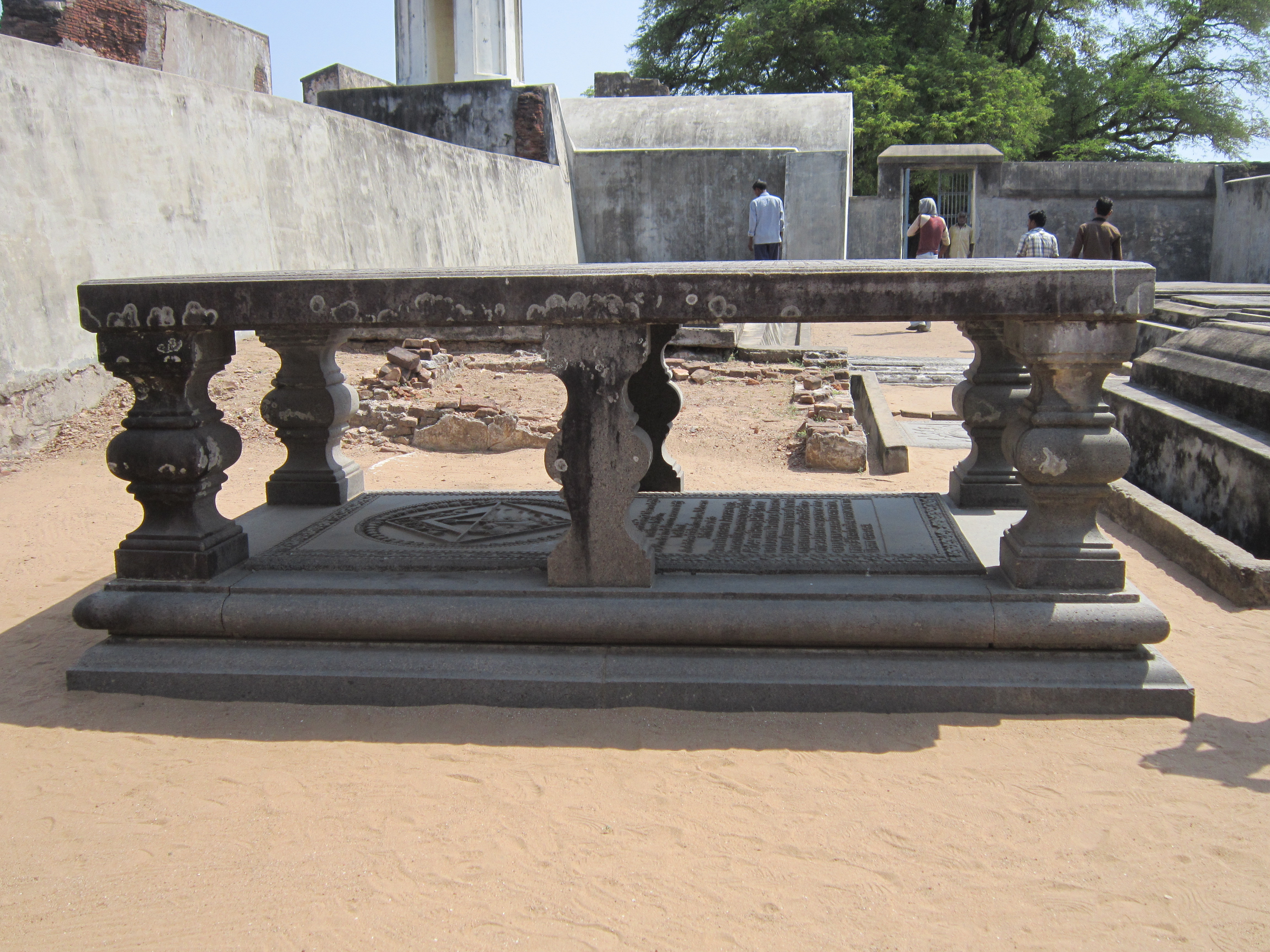

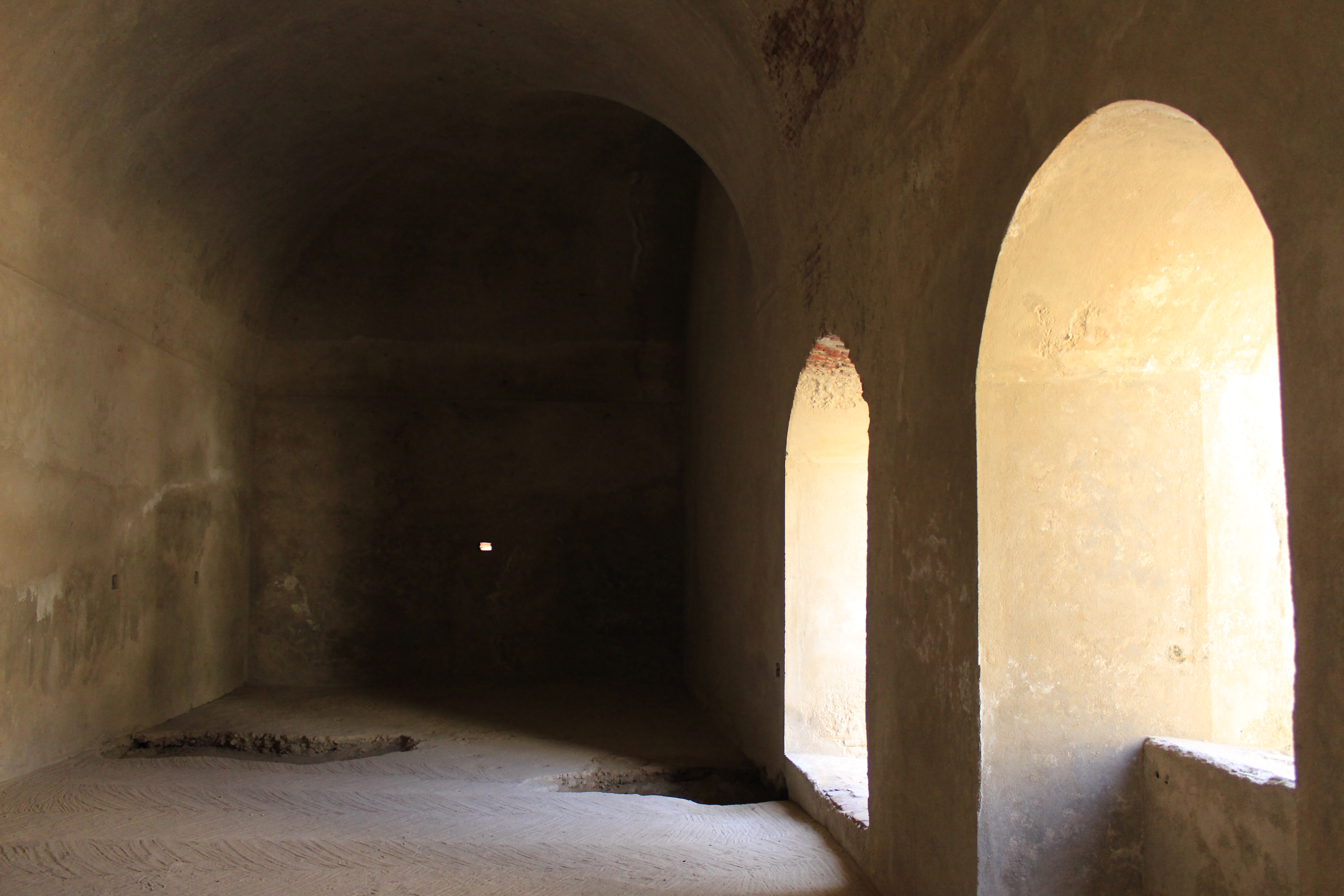

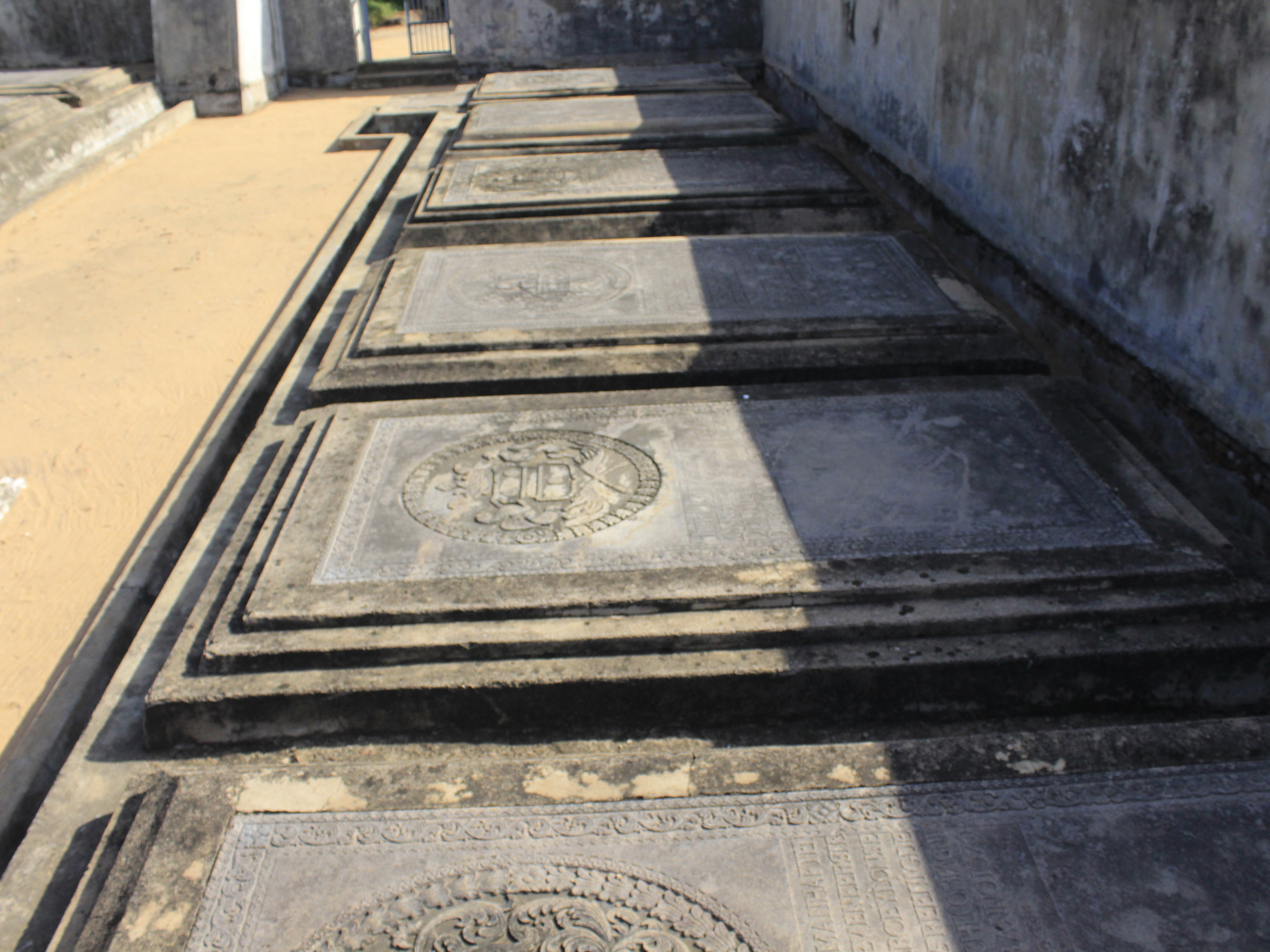

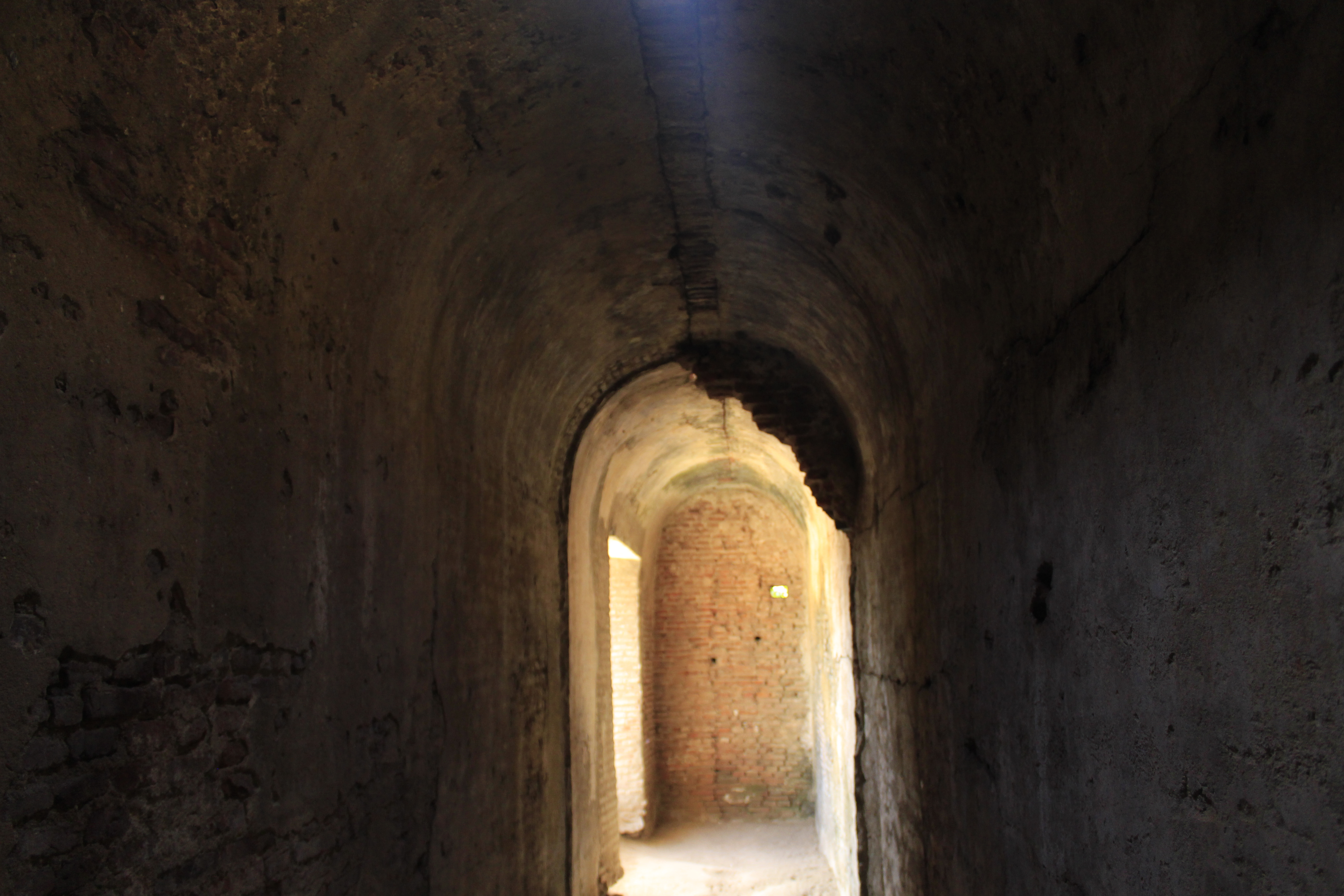
