= Pulicat =

Pulicat Pazhaverkadu
- Suburb of Chennai
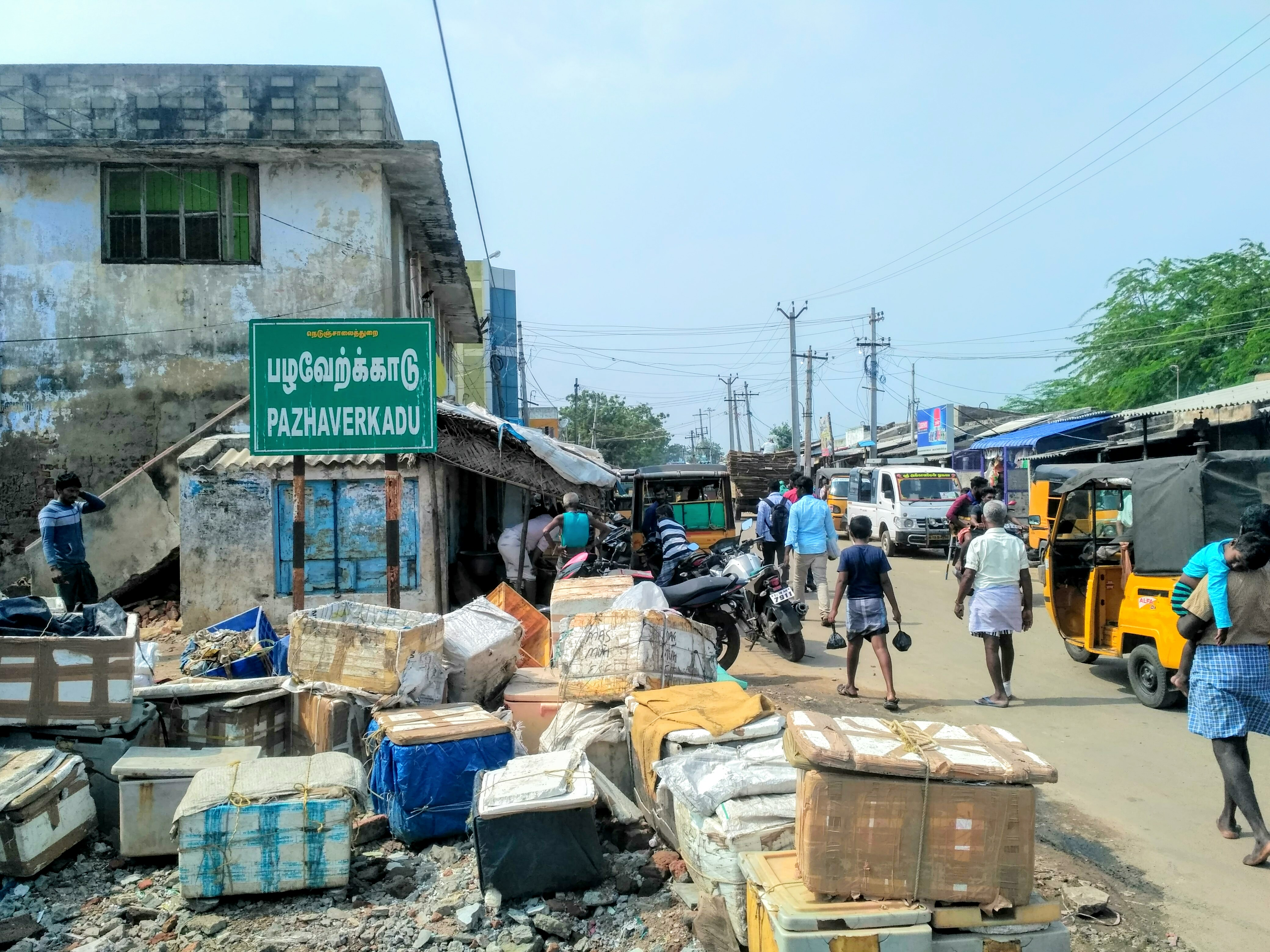

- Pulicat (Tamil Nadu)
- Coordinates: 13.417700°N 80.318500°E
- Country: India
- State: Tamil Nadu
- Elevation: 29 m (95 ft)

Languages
  - Official: Tamil
- Time zone: UTC+5:30 (IST)

Pulicat or Pazhaverkadu is a historic seashore town in Chennai Metropolitan Area at Thiruvallur District, of Tamil Nadu state, India. It is about 60 kilometres (37 mi) north of Chennai and 3 kilometres (1.9 mi) from Elavur, on the southern periphery of the Pulicat Lake. Pulicat Lake is a shallow salt water lagoon which stretches about 60 kilometres (37 mi) along the coast. With lakeside and seashore development as well as several Special Economic Zones (SEZs).

== History ==
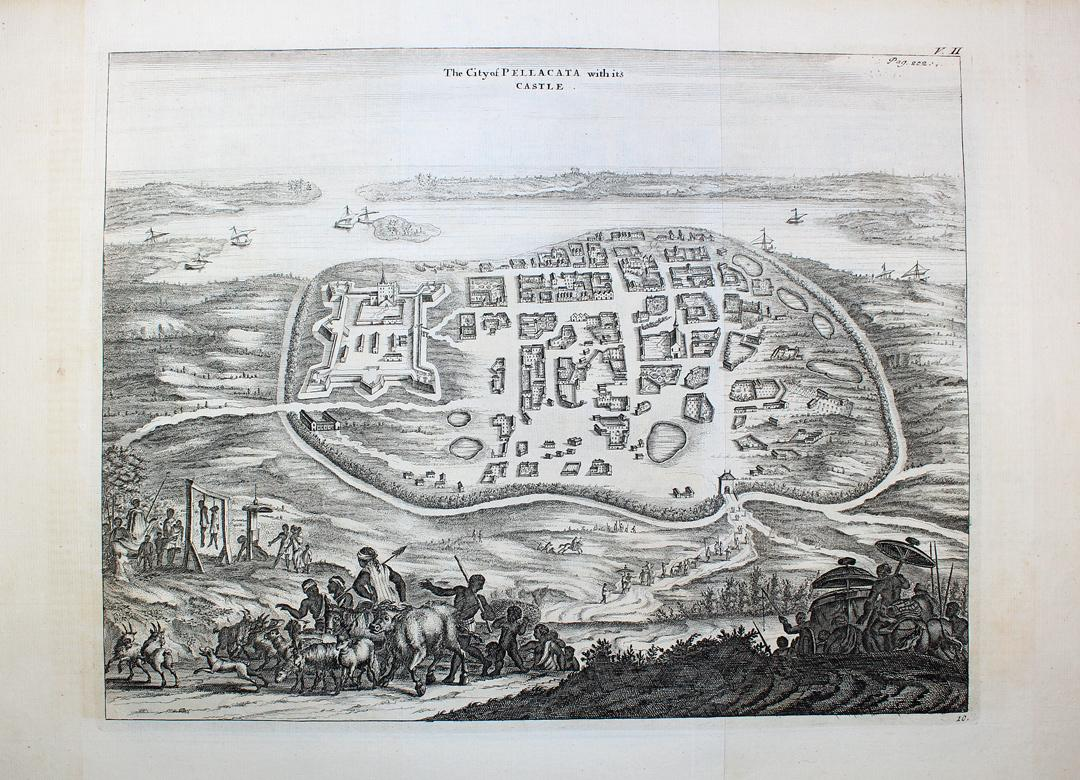
A 1703 illustration depicting a view of the town, with Dutch colonialists hanging Indian people in the lower-left corner.

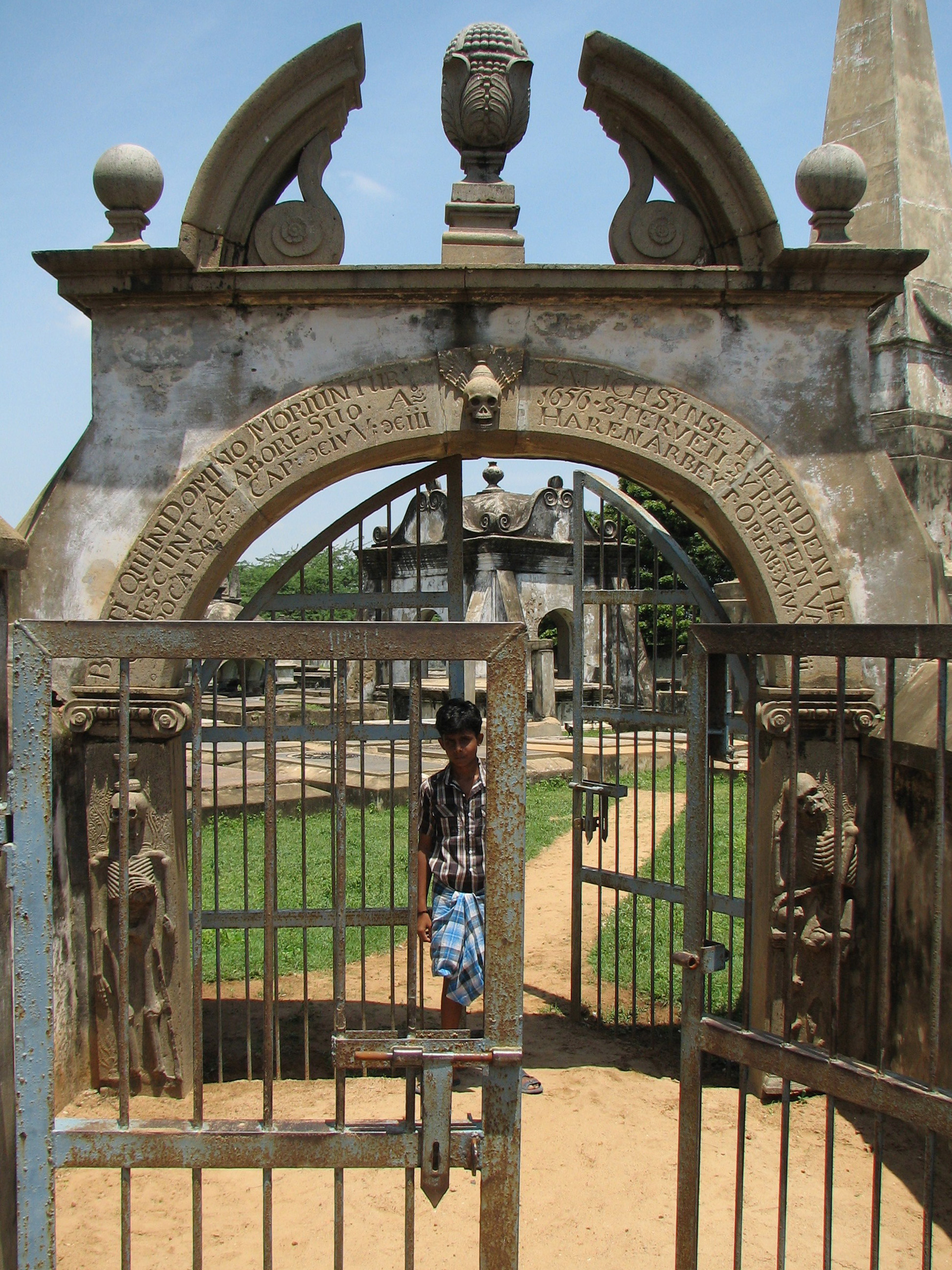
Entrance to the old Dutch Cemetery at Pulicat

The Portuguese established a trading post in Pulicat in 1502 with the help of the Vijayanagar rulers. They built a fort there and held this fort until 1609 when they were defeated by the Dutch. The Dutch occupied Pulicat fort in 1609. Between 1621 and 1665, 131 slave ships were deployed by the Dutch to export 38,441 Indians captured on the Coromandel coast and transported from Pulicat to be sold as slaves to Dutch plantations in Batavia. Pulicat was till 1690 the capital of Dutch Coromandel. It repeatedly changed possession, until finally occupied by the British in 1825. It became part of the Madras Presidency, which later became Madras state in independent India and renamed Tamil Nadu in 1968. The Dutch church has been built over several times and is rather dilapidated today, and the Dutch fort has fallen into ruin. The old lighthouse still stands at the opposite bank of the lake. The cemetery dating to 1622 has been taken under the wing of the Archaeological Survey of India and so has survived the passage of time. The grand, Dutch-inscribed tombs and graves, carved with skeletons rather than the cross, have been quite well preserved. The cemetery lies behind the market.

Aadhi Narayana Perumal temple is an old temple located at Pazhaverkadu.

Pulicat-Day is celebrated on World Wetland Day (2 February) at Pulicat by AARDE Foundation. Famous traditional catamaran competition and several competitions are held on this day. Small information center (Pulicat Museum) at Pazhaverkadu gives detailed information on Pulicat ecology and built heritage.

== Fort Geldria ==
Fort Geldria or Fort Geldaria, located in Pulicat, was the seat of the Dutch Republic's first settlement in India, and the capital of Dutch Coromandel. It was built by the Dutch East India Company in 1613 and became the local governmental centre in 1616. It was named for Geldria, the native province of Wemmer van Berchem, the General Director of the company. Regularly protected by a garrison of 80 to 90 men, Fort Geldria was the only fortification in the Indian empire; all other positions of the Dutch Company were trading posts.

== Wildlife ==
Pulicat is within the Pulicat Lake Bird Sanctuary. Every year between the months of October and March, thousands of migratory birds land here. Though many species can be seen, flamingos are the most visible, covering the swamps surrounding the lake, giving it a pink tinge.
