= Velugoti Kasturi Ranga Nayaka =

Indian military commander

Military General Raja of Venkatagiri estate
- In office 1579–1600
- Monarchs: Sriranga Deva Raya; Venkatapati Raya

Military service
- Allegiance: Vijayanagara Empire
- Battles/wars: Kondaraju-Velugoti War; Battle of Kodur; Wars with Golconda; Siege of Penukonda; Raid Into Kondavidu; Battle of Kamalakuru; Battle of Kottalanka; Expedition to Morasunadu; Siege of Kolar; Battle of Kottakanama Pass

Kasturi Ranga Nayaka also known as Kasturi Ranga was a prominent Velugoti chief and a military commander of the Vijayanagara Empire. He served under Sriranga Deva Raya and later under his brother Venkatapati Raya. During his career he fought several battles against the Golconda Sultanate and played an important role in suppressing the rebellion of Tammappa Gauda of Kolar. He was also the father of Velugoti Yachama Nayaka who later became a well known military leader.

== Origin ==
Velugoti Kasturi Ranga Nayaka was born into a Telugu family. He was the Raja of the Venkatagiri estate and also served as a military general of the Vijayanagara Empire. He served under both Sriranga Deva Raya and Venkatapati Raya. His son was the well known Velugoti Yachama Nayaka who later became an important commander in the empire.

== Military career ==
=== Kondaraju-Velugoti War ===
==== Battle of Kodur ====
In 1579 A.D. Thimma Raju with the help of his brothers Kondraju, Venkataraju, and Dasariraju expanded his power beyond his earlier limits and seized the territory of Vobala Raju. After losing his land Vobala Raju sought help from Kasturi Ranga Nayaka. Responding quickly Kasturi Ranga Nayaka marched to Kodur with a force of about 2,000 men. He was soon joined by Dama Venkatappa Nayaka who arrived with a smaller group of soldiers to support the Ranga Nayaka.

When Thimma Raju heard about these movements he quickly gathered his allies from Katreni, Vanka, Kunapalli, and nearby areas and marched to Yerraguntla. He then sent a message through Guthi Venkata Raju saying that there was no reason for Ranga Nayaka to interfere and that he was willing to settle the matter peacefully. However Ranga Nayaka replied that he had already given a promise to restore Vobala Raju’s lands and that fighting would end only if this condition was met.

Thimma Raju then launched the attack with a large force of ninety war elephants, one thousand cavalry, and twelve thousand infantry. Rangappa Naidu, though he had only a small number of followers and friends, faced the enemy with great courage. After fierce fighting, Thimma Raju’s army was defeated. Fifty-three of his leaders, including Linga Raju and Thimmanna, along with all four commanders, were killed in the battle. The remaining chiefs and leaders surrendered and were spared their lives.

=== Wars With Golconda ===
==== Siege of Penukonda ====
In 1590 A.D. Muhammad Quli Qutub Shah sent his commander Mir Jumla Amin-ul-Mulk with a strong army to the south after learning that Basawanta Raj and his nephew Narasimha Raj were controlling the forts of Nandyala and Kalagur. The Sultan later joined the army and crossed the Krishna River at Musalimudugu, after which the fort was surrounded and captured. Seeing that resistance was useless, Narasimha Raj agreed to surrender on the condition that his family be allowed to leave safely, and the Sultan accepted this and protected both their lives and property. Soon after Basawanta Raj left Nandyala and the nearby chiefs submitted peacefully agreeing to pay tribute while retaining their lands. As a result of this campaign, the forts of Gooty, Kurnool, and Gandikota also came under the Sultan’s control.

After capturing Gandikota Sultan Muhammad Quli Qutub Shah personally joined his army and decided to act against Venkatapati Raya believing that the emperor had violated certain treaty terms. To punish him the Sultan marched toward Penukonda which was then the capital of the Vijayanagara Empire. His army met little resistance on the way and reached the city without delay. On arrival he surrounded Penukonda and laid siege to it.

At this time Venkatapati Raya was not ready to defend Penukonda against the sudden invasion as he could not gather his army quickly enough. To gain time he chose to seek peace and sent his minister Goparaju Timma and his general Papayya Setty to the Sultan’s camp. They held talks with Muhammad Quli Qutub Shah and managed to secure a temporary truce while arrangements were made for a lasting agreement. Pleased with the result of the campaign the Sultan then withdrew his army from the area around Penukonda.

Venkatapati Raya used the brief peace to strengthen his position. Within three days, he filled the citadel with enough food and supplies to face a long siege. On the fourth day, a large army entered the fort, including about thirty thousand cavalry and four thousand musketeers, led by commanders such as Gobburi Jagga Raya, Gulranga Setti, Manupa Raju, Papiah Samywar, Raghunatha Nayaka, Matla Anantaraju, Velugoti Kasturi Ranga, Velugoti Chenna, and his son Venkatapati. With the fort well prepared and his forces reinforced, Venkatapati Raya abandoned all signs of submission and openly challenged the Golconda army.

Sultan Muhammad Quli Qutub Shah realized his mistake only when it was too late. When he tried to resume the siege he found that the fort was now well defended and his attempts achieved nothing. With the rainy season approaching and the Krishna River beginning to rise there was a real danger that his army could be cut off from its own lands. Faced with this risk the Sultan chose to withdraw. Contemporary Hindu records also mention that a battle took place before the retreat in which the Vijayanagara Army defeated the army of Golconda.

==== Raid Into Kondavidu ====
Venkatapati Raya set out with a large army to remove the Qutb Shahi garrisons that were still present in his lands. His first move was against Gandikota a fort that controlled the upper Pennar valley, and he laid siege to it. The fort was of great importance as control of the fertile Pennar valley depended on it. However after the Sultan’s recent defeat at Penukonda the Qutb Shahi forces were weakened, and the troops left under Murtaza Khan were too few to resist effectively. Although the Sultan could not send strong reinforcements at that time, he tried to support Murtaza Khan by ordering Afzal Khan the governor of Kondavidu to march with his forces into the Pennar valley.

Afzal Khan gathered his troops and marched toward Gandikota. When Venkata II heard of his advance, he acted quickly to stop him from reaching the fort. He sent Kasturi Ranga and Matla Anantaraju who had recently returned after defeating Tammappa Gauda, with orders to block Afzal Khan’s route. At the same time he instructed the governor of Udayagiri to support them and to raid the lands of Kondavidu up to the banks of the Krishna River. When Kasturi Ranga and Matla Anantaraju reached Udayagiri the governor joined them by sending a strong force led by his son-in-law, Woorias Ray. Together they marched into Kondavidu territory and carried out the campaign as ordered laying waste the region to weaken the enemy.

==== Battle of Kamalakuru ====
Afzal Khan was forced to stop his advance and focus on defending his own district as he could not move forward while his lands were being attacked. To counter this he urged the jagirdars under his control to raid nearby Vijayanagara territory. Acting on his orders the jagirdars gathered their men and invaded the Udayagiri region looting the countryside. This forced the governor of Udayagiri Fort to recall his son-in-law to protect his lands, and Kasturi Ranga and Matla Anantaraju also had to return to save their own estates from damage. When they came back, they found the jagirdars camped at Kamalakur within Anantaraju’s territory. They defeated them in battle and chased them as far as Kocccerlakota the last Vijayanagara stronghold on the frontier.

==== Battle of Kottalanka ====
After driving the jagirdars across the frontier Kasturi Ranga and Woorias Ray were free to strike again at the Qutb Shahi lands. They moved deep into the Kondavidu region where they met Afzal Khan at an unknown place. While an anonymous Golconda historian claimed that Afzal Khan won this encounter the Hindu accounts suggest otherwise. Afzal Khan failed to reach Gandikota with the reinforcements demanded by the Sultan which does not support his claim of victory. It is more likely that he suffered a serious defeat in the battle possibly the same action in which Kasturi Ranga is said to have destroyed many Golconda troops near the meeting point of three rivers close to Kota and Kottalanka.

=== Expedition to Morasunadu ===
Venkatapati Raya’s success at the siege of Penukonda did not bring immediate control over the whole empire. The disorder caused by the Golconda invasion encouraged some feudatory chiefs to stop paying tribute and openly challenge his authority. At the same time Qutb Shahi garrisons still held several important forts in the Cuddapah and Kurnool regions. Because of this Venkatapati Raya was forced to act firmly to restore order. Among the most serious threats was Tammappa Gauda who controlled many forts including Kolar in the Morasu country. Since his territory lay close to Penukonda the Vijayanagara Empire capital.

==== Battle of Kottakanama Pass ====
Venkatapati Raya sent an army against Tammappa Gauda under the leadership of Kasturi Ranga, Matla Anantaraju and Raghunatha Nayaka of Tanjore. The Vijayanagara forces were first blocked at the Kottakanama pass, where Tammappa Gauda resisted them with nearly twenty-five thousand Manne infantry. After a hard fight, he was defeated by Velugoti Kasturi Ranga and Velugoti Timma and was forced to withdraw deeper into his own territory.

== See also ==
- Venkatapati Raya
- Velugoti Yachama Nayaka
- Matla Ellamaraju
