= Aravidu Gopalaraju =

Military General Governor of Kurnool
- In office 1597–1624
- Monarchs: Venkatapati Raya; Sriranga II; Rama Deva Raya

Personal details
- Parent: Aravidu Rangapparaju (father)

Military service
- Allegiance: Vijayanagara Empire
- Battles/wars: Krishnamraju's Rebellion; Battle of Jammalamadugu; Siege of Nandela; War With Bijapur Sultanate; First Siege of Kurnool; Second Siege of Kurnool

Aravidu Gopalaraju was a Vijayanagara noble and governor of Kurnool who served under Venkata II, Sriranga II and Rama Deva Raya. A grandson of Aravidu Venkatadri, he rebelled against Venkata II during his early governorship but was defeated. He later resisted the Bijapur Sultanate's attempts to capture Kurnool under Abdul Wahab Khan, successfully defending the city during the siege of 1619–1620. However, when the Bijapur army besieged Kurnool again in 1624, Gopalaraju abandoned the city and fled to an unknown location, allowing the sultanate to annex the territory.

== Life ==
Aravidu Gopalaraju was the son of Rangapparaju and his wife Timmamma, and the grandson of Aravidu Venkatadri. He served as the governor of Kurnool province during the reigns of Venkata II, Sriranga II and Rama Deva Raya of the Vijayanagara Empire.

== Military career ==
=== Rebellion against Venkata II ===
During 1597–1598, several chiefs in Rayalaseema rose against Venkatapati Raya's authority. The rebellion was initiated by Nandela Krishnamaraju, who had recently succeeded his father Narasimharaju. He withheld the customary tribute and proclaimed his independence from the Vijayanagara Empire. The revolt gained support from Kondaraju Tirupatiraju, ruler of Pottapi and Siddavatam who took control of the amaram villages assigned to the Matlifamily for their allegiance to the emperor. Aravidu Gopalaraju the governor of Kurnool and grandson of Aravidu Venkatadri also joined the uprising.

==== Battle of Jammalamadugu ====
Venkatapati Raya personally led a military campaign to put down the rebellion, accompanied by several prominent nobles, including Matla Ellamaraju, Hande Devappa Nayaka, and Pemmasani Timma Nayaka. On learning of the Vijayanagara army's approach, Kondaraju Tirupatiraju reinforced the defences of his forts, particularly Utukuru near the frontier. Meanwhile, Nandela Krishnamaraju and Gopalaraju advanced with their forces to confront the emperor. The two armies met at Jammalamadugu, where the rebels were defeated. Krishnamaraju withdrew from the battlefield and took refuge in the fort of Nandela.

==== Siege of Nandela ====
Venkatapati Raya pursued Krishnamaraju and besieged the fort of Nandela for nearly three months. Realising that he could no longer defend the fort Krishnamaraju sought a settlement and requested Matla Ellamaraju to intercede with the emperor. Ellamaraju agreed to negotiate on his behalf but managed to secure only Krishnamaraju's life. The fort was subsequently surrendered to Venkatapati Raya who confiscated Krishnamaraju's estates and distributed them between Hande Devappa Nayaka and Pemmasani Timma Nayaka. Gandikota formerly the principal stronghold of the Nandela chiefs later became the seat of Pemmasani Timma Nayaka and his successors.

Following their defeat, Krishnamaraju and Gopalaraju were taken to Chandragiri and imprisoned. Krishnamaraju remained in captivity until his death. The available records do not clearly describe the punishment imposed on Gopalaraju for his involvement in the rebellion. However, the Cittaveli Kaifiyat mention that he was also taken to Chandragiri and held there alongside Krishnamaraju for sometime.

=== War With Bijapur Sultanate ===
==== First Siege of Kurnool ====
Following the death of Venkata II the civil war between the factions of Gobburi Jagga Raya and Velugoti Yachama Nayaka which continued for nearly fifteen years, attracted the attention of the Deccan sultanates particularly the Sultan of Bijapur, who sought to exploit the internal conflict to extend his dominions over the western Telugu region. In 1619–1620 AD he dispatched an expeditionary force under his commander Abdul Wahab Khan to attack Kurnool.

Gopalaraju, the governor of Kurnool offered strong resistance to the Bijapur army. The Sultan of Golconda, who maintained friendly relations with Gopalaraju, may have provided him with assistance. This is supported by the account of Ravella Ayyapa II one of Gopalaraju's subordinates, who received a jewelled crown from Rama Deva Raya as a reward for his services. Hostilities between Gopalaraju and the Sultan of Bijapur ended with the conclusion of a peace agreement in December 1621.

==== Second Siege of Kurnool ====
The Sultan of Bijapur continued his attempts to capture Kurnool. In 1624, he again dispatched Abdul Wahab Khan with an army to besiege the fort. Facing mounting pressure, Gopalaraju appealed to the neighbouring chiefs for military assistance. In response, the Hande and Pemmasani Nayaks sent their forces to his aid, while Matli Tiruvengalanatha, son of Matli Anantaraju, who had earlier pledged support to Gopalaraju at Chandragiri also joined with Gopalaraju with his troops.

Abdul Wahab Khan defeated the allied army in the battle fought near Kurnool. The Hande and Pemmasani contingents withdrew, while Matli Tiruvengalanatha was killed in the fighting. With the defeat of his allies and the loss of military support, Gopalaraju left Kurnool. The fort and its surrounding territories subsequently passed under Bijapur Sultanate's control.

Rama Deva Raya was unable to assist Gopalaraju, as he was occupied with internal affairs. He may have intended to recover Kurnool after suppressing the rebellious nobles in 1629 but his death on 24 May 1630, at the age of twenty, ended any prospect of restoring Vijayanagara control over the region.

== Family ==
Gopalaraju married Vengamma the daughter of Gobburi Giriyappa and Timmamma the daughter of Jillella Ranga. He also adopted Sriranga III as his son.

== See also ==
- Sriranga III
- Hampi
- Golconda fort
