= Matla Anantaraju =

Chief of the Matli Chiefs (1581–1605)

Rachabebbuli Manne Hamvira Matla Anantaraju

Military General Raja of Siddavatam Chief of Matli Chiefs
- In office 1581–1605
- Monarch: Venkatapati Raya

Personal details
- Parent: Matla Ellamaraju (father)

Military service
- Allegiance: Vijayanagara Empire
- Battles/wars: Wars with Golconda; Siege of Penukonda; Siege of Gandikota; Siege of Gooty; Battle of Kamalakuru; Siege of Gurramkonda Fort; Expedition Against Madurai; Siege of Madurai; Expedition to Morasunadu; Siege of Kolar; Battle of Kottakanama Pass; Tirupatiraju's Rebellion; Battle of Utukuru; Capture of Siddavatam; Battle of Cennur; Krishnamraju's Rebellion; Battle of Janmalamadugu; Siege of Nandela

Matla Anantaraju also known as Matla Ananta was an important chief of the Matli Chiefs and a trusted military commander under the Vijayanagara Empire. He took part in many battles against the Golconda Sultanate and played a key role in defending the empire. Matla Ananta also helped suppress the Madurai Nayaks and several rebellious chiefs in the Rayalaseema region who rose against Emperor Venkatapati Raya.

== Origin ==
Matla Anantaraju was born into a Telugu family. He was the son of Matla Ellamaraju the leader of Matli Chiefs and a military commander under Venkatapati Raya and his mother was Rangamamba.

== Military career ==
=== Wars With Golconda ===
==== Siege of Penukonda ====
In 1590 A.D., Sultan Muhammad Quli Qutub Shah sent his commander Mir Jumla Aminul-Mulk with a strong army to the south to remove Basawanta Raj and Narasimha Raj, who controlled the forts of Nandyal and Kalagur. The Sultan later joined the army, crossed the Krishna River and captured the forts after which Narasimha Raj surrendered on the promise of safety for his family and property. Other local chiefs also submitted and important forts like Gooty, Kurnool, and Gandikota came under Golconda control. Believing that Venkatapati Raya had broken treaty terms the Sultan marched toward Penukonda the Vijayanagara capital and laid siege to it. Unable to resist at first Venkatapati Raya sought peace to gain time strengthened the fort and gathered a large army. When the Sultan tried to resume the siege he found Penukonda well defended and was forced to withdraw due to strong resistance and the approaching rains. Records state that a battle took place in which the Vijayanagara forces, led by chiefs like Gobburi Jagga Raya and Matla Anantaraju defeated the Golconda army forcing the Sultan to retreat after securing control over some captured territories.

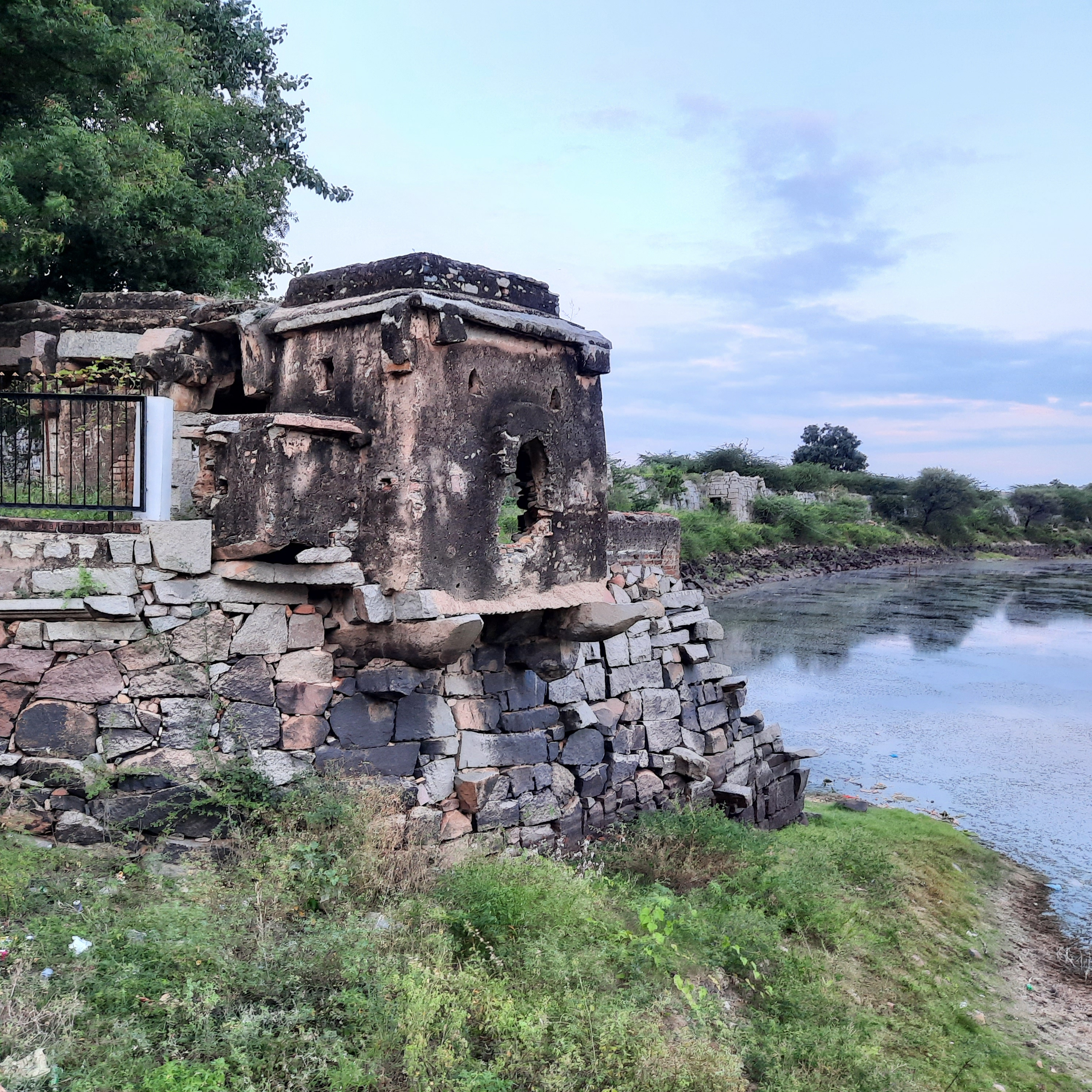
Pennukonda Fort Andhra

==== Battle of Kamalakuru ====
A large force of Uriya and Manne nobles, led by the Ravella chief and supported by Golconda troops, advanced from Udayagiri to surround the Badvel region and camped at Kamalakuru in the Siddavatam area of present-day Cuddapah district. Another section of this army moved south under a Ravella leader and reached the hillfort of Gurramkonda in today's Chittoor district. Venkatapati Raya quickly ordered his nobles Matla Ananta and Kasturi Rangappa to face the threat. They marched without delay and met the enemy near Kamalakur where the Vijayanagara forces defeated the Golconda troops and drove them back. Kasturi Rangappa then chased the fleeing soldiers and pursued them as far as Koccerlakota.

==== Siege of Gurramkonda ====
After his victory at Kamalakur Matla Anantaraju marched with his army toward the hillfort of Gurramkonda and laid siege to it. The Ravilla chief Velikonda Venkatadri defended the fort with strong artillery and ample supplies, using gunpowder mines, heavy cannon fire, and stones thrown from the walls. In spite of these dangers Matla Ananta did not withdraw and continued the siege. His efforts succeeded when one of the fort's bastions was destroyed. Unable to resist any longer the Ravilla chief sought peace surrendered the fort and returned to his own country.

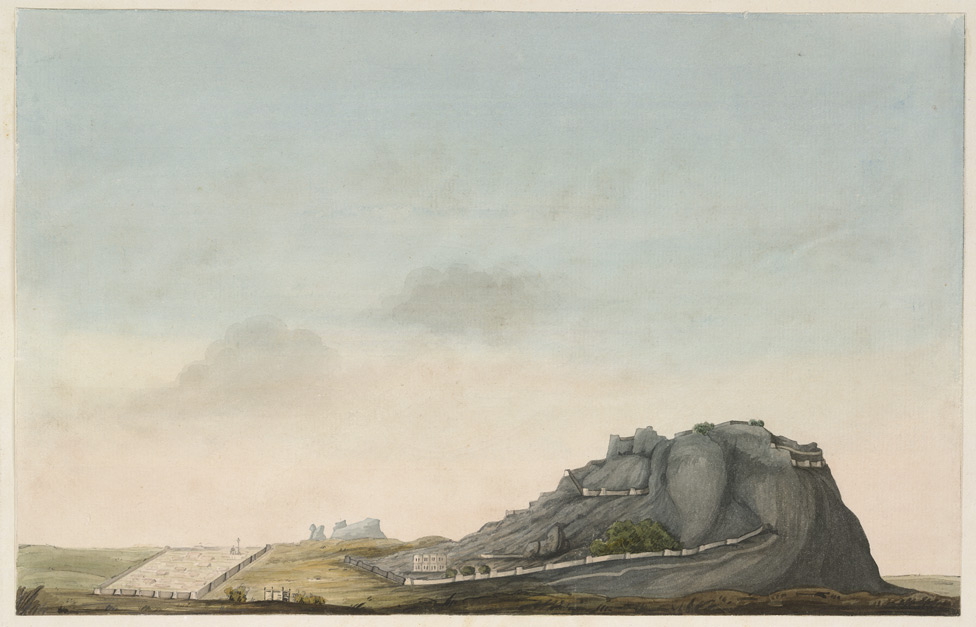
View of Gurramkonda Fort

==== Siege of Gandikota ====
After his victory at Penukonda against Muhammad Quli Qutub Shah, Venkatapati Raya moved against the remaining Golconda garrisons, beginning with the strong fort of Gandikota at the head of the Penneru valley. He surrounded the fort and began the siege. Sanjar Khan the commander of Gandikota was known for his bravery and defended the fort with all the troops available to him. During this siege Matla Ananta defeated the strong cavalry of Qutub Shahi near Gandikota.

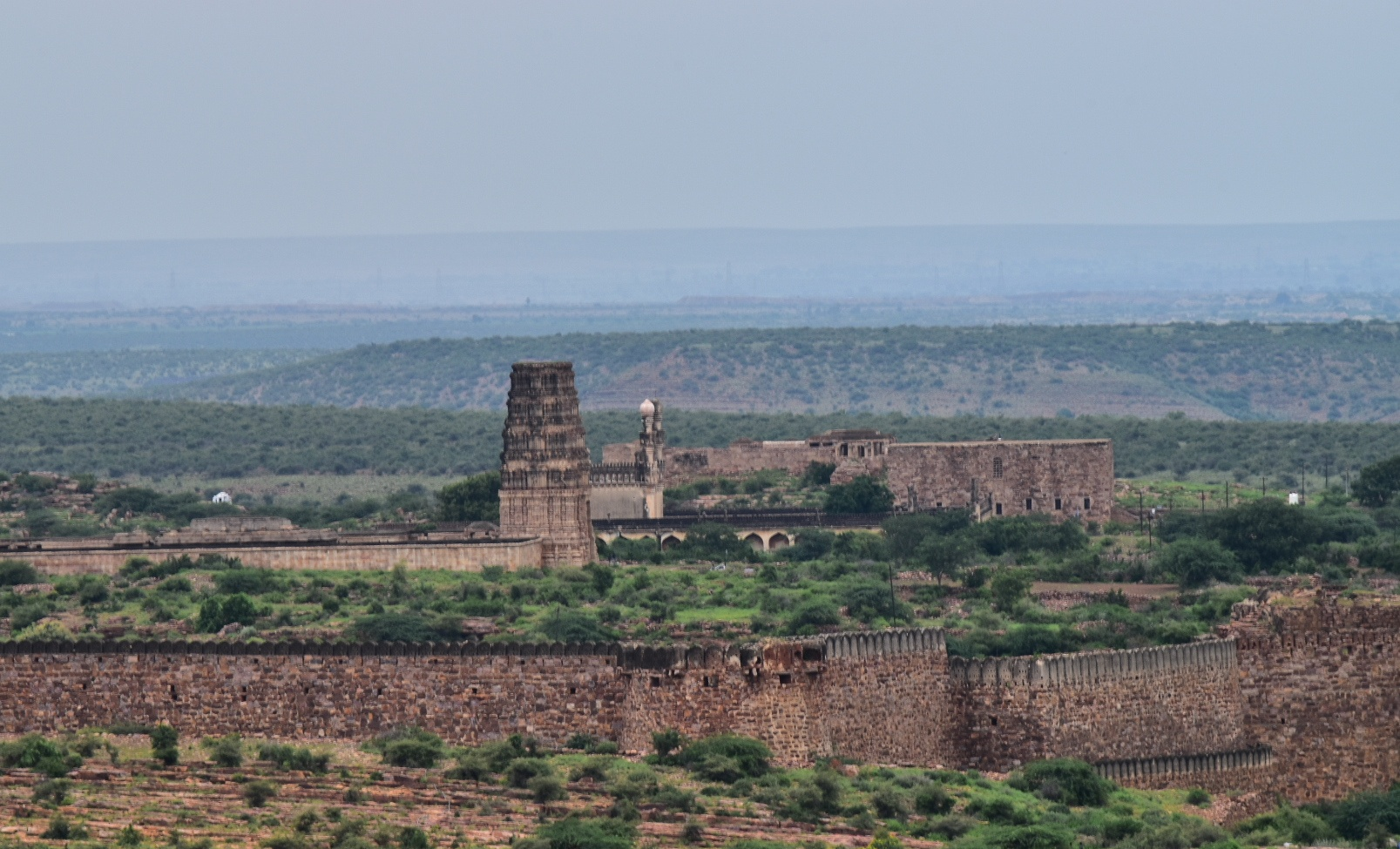
Gandikota fort

=== Expedition Against Kolar ===
==== Siege of Kolar ====
While Venkatapati Raya was busy facing the Golconda invasion Tammappa Gauda who controlled several forts including Kolar in the Morasu country took advantage of the situation and rebelled against Vijayanagara authority. After defeating the Golconda army at Penukonda Venkatapati Raya turned his attention to this threat and sent a force under Kasturi Ranga, Matla Anantaraju, and Raghunatha Nayaka of Tanjore. The royal army was first checked at the Kottakanama pass where Tammappa Gauda opposed them with a large body of Manne foot soldiers but he was defeated and forced to retreat inward. Matla Anantaraju then laid siege to Kolar while Raghunatha Nayaka raided the Morasu country and scattered enemy forces from nearby forts. Unable to resist further Tammappa Gauda finally submitted and paid the overdue tribute to the royal treasury.

=== Expedition Against Madurai Nayaks ===
==== Siege of Madurai ====
In 1595 AD, Virappa Nayaka of Madurai rebelled against Venkatapati Raya by refusing to obey Vijayanagara authority and failing to pay tribute. Angered by this defiance Venkatapati Raya marched to Madurai with a large army accompanied by Matla Anantaraju and laid siege to the city. Although Virappa Nayaka tried to weaken the Vijayanagara camp by bribing some commanders including the emperor's nephew Tirumala the rebellion did not last long. Venkatapati Raya defeated Virappa Nayaka who was forced to submit and accept Vijayanagara rule.

=== Tirupatiraju's Rebellion ===
==== Battle of Utukuru ====
After the death of Sriranga Deva Raya Kondaraju Tirupatiraju tried to rule Siddavatam and Pottapi on his own while the Matla chief Ellamaraju and his sons supported Venkatapati Raya at Chandragiri. Because of old enmity with the Matla family Tirupatiraju seized several villages in Siddavatam and Pottapinadu and built a fort at Utukur to guard the area. To stop this rebellion Venkatapati Raya sent an army under Ellamaraja and Anantaraju with orders to capture Pottapi and destroy the fort promising him Siddavatam as amaram for success. Ellamaraja marched to Utukur fought Tirupatiraju's forces outside the village and killed him in the battle. He then secured the fort and defeated Tirupatiraju's followers who tried to escape toward Poli, Neladalur, Kondur, and the Niru Hills, bringing the entire region back under Vijayanagara Empire control.

==== Battle of Cennur ====
Tirumalaraju, the younger brother of Matla Ellamaraja, led another force with Anantaraju toward Cennur. He captured the town and put to death Kondraju Venkatadriraju, who had been ruling the area on behalf of Tirupatiraju. After securing Cennur, Tirumalaraju moved swiftly across the region and brought Kamalapuram, Duvvur, Porumamilla, and Badvel under his control. He also subdued the local Manne chiefs and smaller palems.

==== Capture of Siddavatam ====
Ellamaraju and Anantaraju later marched on Siddavatam and captured the fort without delay. With its fall the remaining resistance in the region collapsed and Siddavatam was brought under Vijayanagara Empire control.

=== Krishnamraju's Rebellion ===
==== Battle of Jammalamadugu ====
In 1597–98 A.D, Venkatapati Raya faced a major rebellion in the Rayalaseema region led by several Kshatriya chiefs. The revolt began when Nandela Krishnamaraju after succeeding his father Narasimharaju refused to pay tribute and declared independence with support from Gopalaraju of Kurnool. Venkatapati Raya marched to suppress the uprising with the help of trusted nobles like Matla Ellamaraju, Matla Anantaraju, Hande Devappa Nayaka, and Pemmasani Timma Nayaka. As the imperial army advanced Kondaraju Tirupatiraju strengthened his forts, while Krishnamaraju moved out to oppose the emperor. The two forces met at Jammalamadugu where Krishnamaraju was defeated in battle and forced to retreat and take refuge in the fort of Nandela.

==== Siege of Nandela ====
Venkatapati Raya after his victory at Jammalamadugu followed Krishnamraju and laid siege to the fort of Nandela for nearly three months. Realizing that he could not defend the fort any longer, Krishnamraju decided to seek peace and asked Matla Ellamaraju to speak to the emperor on his behalf. Ellamaraju agreed, but he was able to secure only Krishnamraju's life. The fort was then surrendered to Venkatapati Raya and Krishnamraju's estates were confiscated. These lands were granted to Hande Devappa Nayaka and Pemmasani Timma Nayaka, and Gandikota once the main stronghold of the Nandela chiefs later became the capital of Pemmasani Timma Nayaka and his descendants.

== Building activities ==
Matli Anantaraju carried out several important works at Siddavatam during his rule. He built a large tank in his own name and another tank in memory of his father Ellamaraju. Towards the later part of his life he also began constructing a strong wall around the town to protect the temple of Siddavataesvara. This wall still exists today though it was later converted into a fort by the Muslims. Anantaraju did not live to see the work finished as he died while the wall was still under construction. According to the Siddavatam village Kaifiyat the work was completed later by his son and successor Tiruvengalanatha.

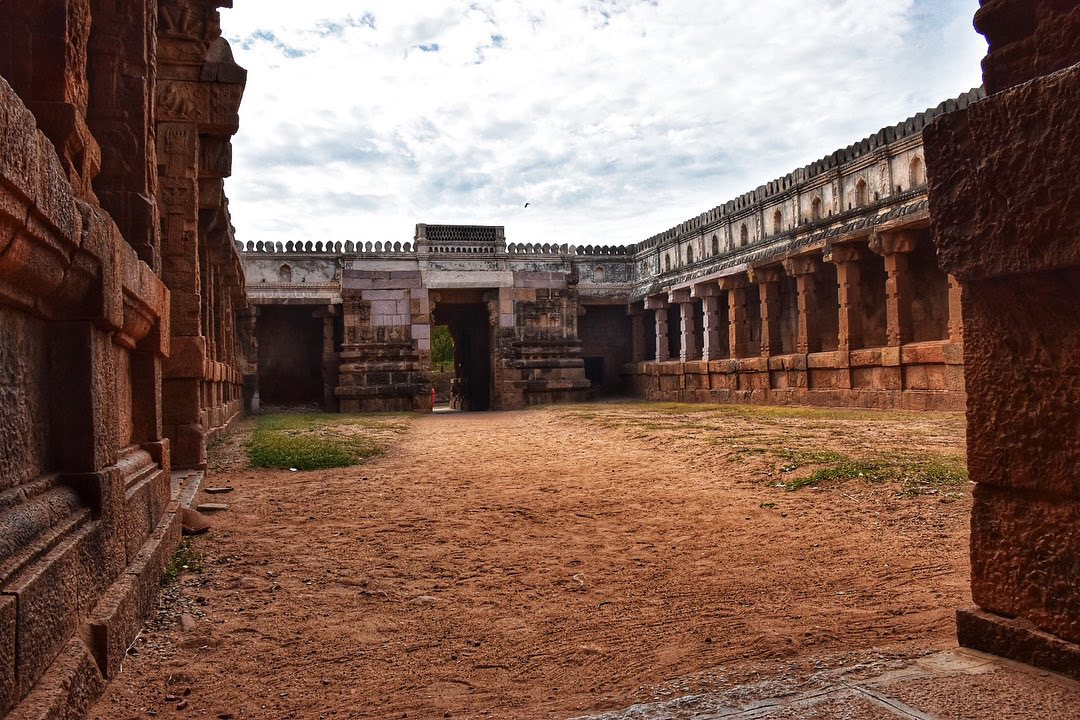
Siddavatam Fort near Kadapa

== Literary Works ==
Matla Anantaraju dedicated his work Kakusthavijayamu to his father Ellamaraju and it was written while his father was still alive. Besides this famous poem he also wrote other scholarly works but they have not survived to the present day. Anantaraju was known as a learned man with strong command over literature. His Kakusthavijayamu earned high praise from literary scholars and continues to be respected as an important work in Telugu literature.

== Titles ==
Titles of Matla Anantaraju

- Rachabebbuli
- Manne Hamvira

== See also ==
- Matli Chiefs
- Venkatapati Raya
- Vijayanagara Empire
