= Siege of Gurramkonda Fort =

Conflict between Vijayanagara Empire and Ravella Nayaks

Siege of Gurramkonda
- Part of Deccani–Vijayanagar wars
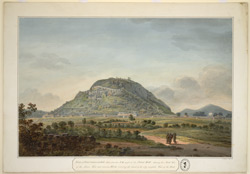
- Painting of Gurramkonda Fort
Date	Unknown
Location	Gurramkonda, Andhra Pradesh, India
Result	Vijayanagar victory

Belligerents
Vijayanagar Empire; Supported by: Vijayanagara Vassals: Matli Chiefs	Ravella Nayaks; Supported by: Golconda Sultanate

Commanders and leaders
Venkatapati Raya; Matla Anantaraju	Ravella Velikonda Venkatadri (surrendered)

The Siege of Gurramkonda was a conflict between Vijayanagara Empire and Ravella Nayaks supported by Golconda Sultanate Matla Ananta besieged the Gurramkonda Fort held by the Ravilla chief Velikonda Venkatadri. Despite strong defence from the garrison Ananta continued the siege until part of the fort was broken. Seeing no way to hold out the Ravilla chief asked for peace and withdrew from the fort to his domain.

== Background ==
=== Capture of Gooty ===
After their victory at Penukonda, the Vijayanagara army moved quickly to drive out the Golconda garrisons still holding important forts. They first captured Gooty and then marched toward Gandikota. At the same time Sultan Muhammad Quli Qutub Shah ordered Afzal Khan, the governor of Kondavidu to send help to the Gandikota garrison.

=== Vijaynagara Raids Into Kondavidu ===
The troops left Kondavidu without enough protection during their journey. When Venkatapati Raya learned about their movement he sent instructions to Kowalanunda the governor of Udayagiri to trouble the advancing army and damage Golconda held areas. Kowalanunda then sent his son-in-law Woorias Ray who carried out a successful raid into Kondavidu territory and caused serious disruption to the enemy.

=== Battle of Kamalakuru ===
Afzal Khan, unable to face the advancing Vijayanagara forces tried to strengthen his position by urging the local jagirdars to gather their men and destroy the Udayagiri region. While one Muslim account claims that Afzal Khan and Ajada Khan won a victory the Hindu records tell a different story. The Kaifiyat of Cittiveli explains that a large force of Uriya and Manne nobles led by the Ravella chief and joined by Golconda troops moved from the direction of Udayagiri to surround the Badvel area. They camped at Kamalakuru in the Siddavatam region of present-day Cuddapah district. Part of this combined army marched further south under a Ravilla family leader and reached the hill-fort of Gurramkonda in today’s Chittoor district.

Venkatapati Raya ordered his nobles Matla Ananta and Kasturi Rangappa to drive out the invading forces. Following his command both leaders marched swiftly toward Kamalakur. In the battle Vijayanagara troops defeated the Golconda army and forced them to retreat. Kasturi Rangappa continued the chase and pursued the scattered enemy as far as Koccerlakota. Meanwhile, Matla Ananta moved toward Gurramkonda with his men and laid siege to the hill-fort.

== Siege ==
The Ravilla chief who had plenty of artillery and supplies put up a strong defence at Gurramkonda. Even though the defenders used gunpowder mines, heavy cannon fire, and hurled stones from the fort Matla Ananta did not give up. He continued the siege pressing forward despite the danger. his efforts paid off and one of the fort’s bastions was destroyed. The garrison could no longer hold out and the Ravella chief understood that resistance was useless. He asked for peace and after handing over the fort returned to his own country.

== Aftermath ==
The victories at Kamalakur and Gurramkonda changed the situation in favour of Vijayanagara. The Golconda garrison at Gandikota was left helpless because the reinforcements sent from Kondavidu were stopped on the way and defeated before they could arrive. Sudden floods in the rivers also cut off any chance of support from Golconda. The plan to trouble Venkatapati Raya by attacking his lands failed.

== See also ==
- Siege of Penukonda
- Golconda Sultanate
- Gurramkonda
