= Krishnamraju's Rebellion =

- Part of Rebellion's In Andhra
| Date | 1597–1598 A.D |
| Location | Andhra Pradesh, India |
| Result | Vijayanagar victory |

Belligerents
| Vijayanagar Empire: Matli Chiefs; Pemmasani Nayaks; Hande Nayaks | Chiefs of Nandyala; Chiefs of Kurnool |

Commanders and leaders
| Venkatapati Raya; Matla Ellamaraju; Matla Anantaraju; Pemmasani Timma Nayaka; Hande Devappa Nayaka | Nandela Krishnamraju (surrendered); Aravidu Gopalaraju (surrendered) |

Krishnamraju’s Rebellion was an uprising against the Vijayanagara Empire during the reign of Venkatapati Raya. It began when Nandela Krishnamraju refused to pay tribute and openly declared his independence from Vijayanagara authority. He gathered forces and moved to resist the emperor meeting the Vijayanagara army near Jammalamadugu where his troops were defeated. Krishnamraju then withdrew into his fort of Nandyala which was closely besieged for several months. Realizing that further resistance was useless he surrendered and was taken captive to Chandragiri. His estates were confiscated and the rebellion was fully suppressed restoring Vijayanagara control over the region.

== Background ==
In 1597–98 Venkatapati Raya faced a serious rebellions in the Rayalaseema region led by several Kshatriya chiefs. The exact cause of the revolt is not clear, but it began when Nandela Krishnamaraju who had just succeeded his father Narasimharaju refused to pay tribute and openly declared independence from Vijayanagara authority. He was soon joined by Kondaraju Tirupatiraju the ruler of Pottapi and Siddavatam who seized the amaram villages held by the Matli family because of their loyalty to the emperor. Kandanavolu Gopalaraju the chief of Kurnool and grandson of Venkatadri the brother of Aliya Rama Raya, also supported the rebels.

== Rebellion ==
=== Battle of Jammalamadugu ===
Venkatapati Raya set out with his army to suppress the rebellion, accompanied by trusted nobles such as Matla Ellamaraju, Hande Devappa Nayaka, and Pemmasani Timma Nayaka. When news of the emperor’s advance reached them Kondaraju Tirupatiraju strengthened the defences of his forts especially Utukuru near the border while Nandela Krishnamraju moved out with his troops to face the Raya. The two sides met at Jammalamadugu where a battle was fought. Krishnamraju’s forces were defeated and he was forced to withdraw from the battlefield and take shelter in the fort of Nandela.

=== Siege of Nandela ===
Venkatapati Raya followed him closely and laid siege to the fort of Nandela for nearly three months. Krishnamraju soon realised that he could not hold the fort for long. Before the situation became worse he decided to seek peace and asked Matla Ellamaraju to speak to the Venkatapati Raya on his behalf. Ellamaraju agreed to help but he was able to secure only Krishnamraju’s life. The fort was then surrendered to the emperor Venkatapati Raya. Krishnamraju’s estates were confiscated and granted to Hande Devappa Nayaka and Pemmasani Timma Nayaka. Gandikota which had earlier been the main stronghold of the Nandela chiefs later became the capital of Pemmasani Timma Nayaka and his descendants.

== Aftermath ==
Krishnamraju was taken to Chandragiri after his defeat and kept there as a prisoner until his death. The records do not clearly mention what action Venkatapati Raya took against Gopalaraju of Kurnool who had supported the rebellion. However the Kaifiyat of Cittaveli suggests that Gopalaraju was also brought to Chandragiri and shared captivity with Krishnamraju for some time.

== See also ==
- Tirupatiraju's Rebellion
- Aravidu Dynasty
- Pemmasani Nayaks
