= Battle of Kodur =

Date	27 September 1579 A.D
Location	Kodur, Andhra Pradesh, India
Result	Velugoti Chief victory

Belligerents
Vijayanagar Empire: Venkatagiri estate; Kalahasti Nayaks; Sari Chiefs	Vijayanagar Empire: Chiefs of Siddavatam; Matli Chiefs

Commanders and leaders
Velugoti Kasturi Ranga Nayaka; Damarla Venkatapati; Sari Obanna	Kondaraju Venkataraju; Dasariraju; Kondaraju; Chinna Timmaraju; Matla Timmaraju † Lingaraju †; Thimmana †; Guthi Venkataraju

Strength
2000 infantry	21,000: 12,000 Infantry; 7,000 Kaijitam Soilders; 1,000 Cavalry; 500 Archers; 300 Nobles; 100 Kshatriya Warriors; 97 Elephants; Unknown Number of Musketeers

The Battle of Kodur was fought between rival chiefs of the Vijayanagara Empire led by Velugoti Kasturi Ranga Nayaka on one side and the Kondraju brothers on the other. The Kondraju brothers gathered a large force with the support of several local chiefs and marched to Kodur to challenge Kasturi Ranga. A battle took place in which many important leaders on the Kondraju side including Matla Timmaraju were killed. The Kondraju army was defeated and after the victory Kasturi Ranga restored the lands that had been taken from Sari Obanna.

== Background ==
In 1579 AD Kondraju Venkataraju with the support of his brothers Dasariraju, Kondraju, and Timmaraju, first defeated the Hande chiefs and took over their lands. After this they turned against the Sari family and treated them in the same way seizing their territory. Obanna the head of the Sari family was driven out of his estate and forced to flee. He sought shelter with Velugoti Kasturi Ranga Nayaka the ruler of Eruva in the north-west of the Nellore region and appealed to him for help in restoring his lost lands.

== Battle ==
Velugoti Kasturi Ranga Nayaka agreed to help Obanna and marched with a force of about two thousand infantry, accompanied by his brother-in-law Damerla Venkatapati. Passing through the lands of the Matli chiefs he halted at Kodur in the Badvel taluka of the Cuddapah district. When the Kondraju brothers heard of Kasturi Ranga Nayaka's arrival they gathered several friendly chiefs from Katreni, Vanka, Kunapalli and moved their forces to Yerragunta near Proddatur. There they met the Matla chief Timmaraju and persuaded him to join them by claiming that Velugoti Kasturi Ranga Nayaka had insulted him by crossing his territory without asking permission.

they raised a large army made up of ninety-seven elephants, one thousand cavalry, three hundred nobles, one hundred Kshatriya warriors, five hundred archers, some matchlockmen, and twelve thousand infantry. Their strength was further increased by seven thousand Kaijitam soldiers serving under Matla Timmaraju. With this army the Kondraju brothers and their allies marched from Yerragunta, passed through Siddavatam and reached Nelatur where they set up camp. After making an attempt to settle the dispute with Velugoti Kasturi Ranga Nayaka they advanced to Kodur where a battle was fought on Sunday, 27 September 1579 A.D.

The army of the Kondraju brothers was divided into four divisions the minor chiefs, the Matla forces, the retainers of the Kondraju family, and a mixed body of other warriors. To face this army Velugoti Kasturi Ranga Nayaka rode forward with his lance in hand. He ordered his brother-in-law Damarla Venkatapati to keep the Kondraju brothers and their allies engaged while he himself advanced against Matla Timmaraju who commanded the strongest division. A fierce battle fought in which Matla Timmaraju, Lingaraju, Thimmana and several other chiefs were killed. Many soldiers were captured, while a few managed to escape.

== Aftermath ==
Velugoti Kasturi Ranga Nayaka won a decisive victory over the Kondraju brothers. After defeating them he kept his word to Sari Obana and restored the lands that had been taken from him.

== See also ==
- Tirupatiraju's Rebellion
- Venkatapati Raya
- Vijayanagara Empire
