= Matla Ellamaraju =

Chief of the Matli Chiefs

Military General Raja of Siddavatam Chief of Matli Chiefs
- In office 1571–1598
- Monarchs: Sriranga Deva Raya; Venkatapati Raya

Personal details
- Parent: Matla Konamaraju (father)

Military service
- Allegiance: Vijayanagara Empire
- Battles/wars: Tirupatiraju's Rebellion; Battle of Utukuru; Battle of Poli; Battle of Kondur; Battle of Nandalur; Capture of Siddavatam; Battle of Cennur; Krishnamraju's Rebellion; Battle of Janmalamadugu; Siege of Nandela

Matla Ellamaraju also known as Matla Ellama was an important leader of the Matli Chiefs and a military commander under the Vijayanagara Empire. He was the father of Matla Anantaraju and played a key role in supporting Emperor Venkatapati Raya. Ellamaraju helped suppress major rebellions in the Rayalaseema region including those led by Tirupatiraju of Pottapi and Krishnamraju of Nandyala who had risen against the emperor.

== Origin ==
Matla Ellamaraju was born into a Telugu family and belonged to the well known Matli Chiefs. He was the son of Matla Konamaraju who was the leader of the Matli chiefs and also served as a military commander under Sriranga Deva Raya.

== Military career ==
=== Velugoti–Matli Chiefs War ===
==== Death of Matla Tirumalaraju at Koduru ====
The Kondaraju brothers Dasariraju, Kondaraju, Venkataraju, and Timmaraju were ruling Siddavatam-sima as amaranayakas under the Sriranga Deva Raya. They attacked a neighbouring chief Sari Obana and seized his land which forced Obana to seek help from Velugoti Kasturi Ranga. Kasturi Ranga came with his army and camped at Koduru in the Kamalapuram taluk. In response the Kondaraju brothers gathered many local chiefs and family heads including Matli Tirumala to support them. In 1579 A.D. a fierce battle was fought at Koduru and despite being outnumbered Kasturi Ranga won a decisive victory. Many leaders were killed in the fighting including Matli Tirumala and his cousin Matli Varadaraju Timmaya while little is known from records about Ellamaraju the father of Tirumala except that he was his parent.

=== Tirupatiraju's Rebellion ===
==== Battle of Utukur ====
After the death of Sriranga Deva Raya his younger brother Venkata II became the king. Many nobles did not accept his rule and some like the Kondaraju brothers defied his authority. Matla Ellamaraju and his sons who held the nayamkaram of villages such as Pondaluru, Penagaluru, and Ponnapalli in the Pottapi and Siddavatam regions supported Venkata II who was then ruling from Chandragiri and Penukonda. This support created hostility between the Matli Chiefs and the Kondaraju brothers. In response the Kondarajus seized the amaram villages belonging to the Matlis. Tirupatiraju one of the Kondaraju brothers and ruler of Siddavatam-sima also strengthened his defenses by fortifying the village of Utukur and placing soldiers there to guard his frontier against attacks from Chandragiri.

Venkata II sent an army under Matli Ellamaraju and ordered him to destroy the fort at Utukur which had been built by Tirupatiraju. Ellamaraju was also asked to conquer Pottapi-nadu and place royal garrisons in important areas with the promise that Siddavatam and its surrounding lands would be granted to him as an amaram if he succeeded. When Ellamaraju reached Utukur Tirupatiraju came out with a strong force to oppose him but in the battle that followed Tirupatiraju was killed. Ellamaraju captured the fort, stationed soldiers there and chased the enemy troops who were fleeing through different routes killing many of them at Poli, Konduru, and Nandalur. Some of the defeated soldiers escaped towards the Niru Hills near Pottapi while Ellama advanced to Siddavatam and took it without much resistance.

==== Battle of Chennur ====
At the same time, a force led by Tirumalaraju, Ellamaraju's younger brother marched on Chennur, killed Kondaraju Venkatadriraju and captured the town.

After these victories Ellamaraju went on to bring the regions of Kamalapuram, Duvvur, Porumamilla, and Badvel under his control. During one of the battles against local chiefs and palegars, his brother Tirumalaraju was killed. With these successes a large area covering much of what is now the Cuddapah district came into Ellamaraju's hands. True to his promise Venkata II rewarded him by granting Pulugulanati-sima of the Chandragiri kingdom along with Pottapi-nadu and Siddavatam-simas of the Udayagiri kingdom, and also appointed him governor of Chennur, Duvvur, Kamalapuram, Porumamilla, and Badvel.

=== Krishnamraju's Rebellion ===
==== Battle of Jammalamadugu ====
Ellamaraju remained loyal to Venkata II and gave him important help in suppressing the rebellion of the Nandyala chief, Krishnamraju, who tried to rule independently. Ellamaraju's influence spread beyond Nandyala and reached as far as Gandikota in the Cuddapah region, where the Nandyala family had long attempted to assert independence. Venkata II marched from Chandragiri to deal with the revolt and Ellamaraju and his son Anantaraju joined him at Siddavatam. Near Jammalamadugu Krishnamraju tried to stop the royal army but was defeated and forced back to Nandyala where he resisted for three months before seeking peace. With Ellamaraju's mediation Krishnamraju surrendered to the Raya and was taken to Chandragiri where he lived in honourable confinement until his death.

== Issue ==
According to the Pengaluru inscription dated 1571 A.D. it was commissioned by Matla Tirumalaraju the son of Matla Ellamaraju. The inscription also tells us about Ellamaraju's family. He had four sons named Varada, Tirumalaraju, Chinna Timma, and Matla Anantaraju.

== Death ==
Ellamaraju died soon after returning from this campaign and was succeeded briefly by his son Kona who was killed while facing a revolt of palegars after which his half-brother Matla Anantaraju took charge of the family and its territories.

== See also ==
- Matli Chiefs
- Matla Anantaraju
- Vijayanagara Empire
