= Expedition to Morasunadu =

- Part of Rebellion's In Karnataka
| Date | Unknown |
| Location | Karnataka, India |
| Result | Vijayanagar victory |
| Territorial changes | Tammappa Gauda Submitted to Venkatapati Raya |

Belligerents
| Vijayanagar Empire: Thanjavur Nayaks; Venkatagiri estate; Matli Chiefs | Chief of Morasunadu |

Commanders and leaders
| Venkatapati Raya; Raghunatha Nayaka; Matla Anantaraju; Velugoti Kasturi Ranga Nayaka; Velugoti Timma | Tammappa Gauda (surrendered) |

Strength
| Unknown | 25,000 Infantry |

The Expedition to Morasunadu was an expedition to restore order and reaffirm authority in the Morasunadu region. When Tammappa Gauda who controlled several forts including Kolar stopped paying tribute. Venkatapati Raya sent his commanders to Kolar. After heavy fighting at the Kottakanama pass the rebel forces were defeated and Kolar fell to Vijayanagara Army. Tammappa Gauda was left with no choice but to submit and pay the overdue tribute bringing Morasunadu back under Vijayanagara Empire control.

== Background ==
Venkatapati Raya's victory at Siege of Penukonda did not immediately restore his control over all parts of the empire. The confusion caused by the Golconda invasion encouraged some feudatory chiefs to stop paying tribute and openly defied his authority. At the same time Qutub Shahi garrisons continued to occupy many important forts in the Cuddapah and Kurnool districts. Because of this Venkatapati Raya had to take firm action to suppress these rebellions and drive the Golconda forces out of his territories in order to re-establish stable rule in the Vijayanagara Empire.

Tammappa Gauda who controlled several forts including Kolar in the Morasu country became a serious concern for the empire. Because his territory lay close to Penukonda the capital of Vijayanagara Empire.

== Expedition ==
=== Battle of Kottakanama Pass ===
Venkatapati Raya sent an army against Tammappa Gauda under the command of Kasturi Ranga, Matla Anantaraju, and Raghunatha Nayaka of Tanjore. The Vijayanagara Army were first stopped at the Kottakanama pass where Tammappa Gauda resisted them with about twenty five thousand Manne infantry. he was defeated by Velugoti Timma and was forced to retreat deeper into his own territory.

=== Siege of Kolar ===
Matla Anantaraju then advanced toward Kolar the capital of Tammappa Gauda, and laid siege to the city. He pressed the attack with great force leaving the defenders little chance to hold out. Unable to withstand the vigorous assault the garrison defending the fort of Kolar finally surrendered.

=== Battle of Ballalapura ===
Raghunatha Nayaka marched into the Murasu country and carried out swift raids across the region. When Murasa forces attacked him from Ballalapura and other nearby forts, he met them in battle and defeated them.

== Aftermath ==
After his army was defeated in battle and his main stronghold was lost, Tammappa Gauda soon realized that he could no longer resist the Vijayanagara Army. Seeing that further fighting would only bring more losses he decided to give up the struggle. He made peace with the Venkatapati Raya and agreed to pay all the arrears of tribute that he had earlier withheld from the royal treasury.

== See also ==
- Kolar
- Matla Anantaraju
- Raghunatha Nayaka
