= Battle of Siddhout =

- Part of Deccani–Vijayanagar wars
Date	1649
Location	Siddavatam, Andhra Pradesh, India 14.4667°N 78.9798°E
Result	Vijaynagara-Matli victory

Belligerents
Vijayanagara Empire; Matli Chiefs	Golconda Sultanate

Commanders and leaders
Sriranga III; Kumara Anantaraju II; Ellamaraju	Abdullah Qutb Shah; Mir Jumla II; Baksi Triambak Rao; Unknown †; Unknown †
- Location within South Asia

The Battle of Siddhout was a military conflict fought in 1649 between the forces of the Vijayanagara vassal Matli chief Kumara Anantaraju II and an army of the Golconda Sultanate sent by Mir Jumla II under the command of Baksi Triambak Rao. The battle took place during Golconda's campaign to subdue the remaining Vijayanagara vassals in Rayalaseema Region following the flight of Sriranga III to Mysore. Kumara Anantaraju II defeated the invading army killing two of its commanders, forcing Baksi Triambak Rao to retreat.

== Background ==
Matli chief Kumara Ananta II succeeded the ruler Kumara Anantaraja as his adopted son. During his reign, the Matli principality suffered a major setback when a significant portion of its territory was conquered by the Sultanate of Golkonda around 1644–1645. Despite these losses, Kumara Ananta II continued to rule a fairly extensive domain that included Pulugulanadu in the Chandragiri Rajya, as well as Pottapinadu and Siddavatam regions in present-day Kadapa district. He was assisted in the administration of the principality by his uncle Ellama, who played an important role in governing the state.

Following his defeat at Wandiwash in 1648, Sriranga III was left without a kingdom and became a refugee at the court of one of his former subordinates. This situation was deeply humiliating for the proud ruler. In early 1649, the Nayak of Thanjavur, like the Nayak of Gingee before him, was compelled to submit to the Sultanate of Bijapur, making Thanjavur an unsafe refuge for Sriranga. he decided to seek shelter in the Kingdom of Mysore which had managed to preserve its independence and hoped to rebuild his empire with the help of Mysore army.

== Battle ==
Sriranga III's departure from the Carnatic to Mysore was followed by a renewed Golconda campaign to bring the remaining small principalities depending on Vijayanagara Empire in the Rayalaseema region under its authority. Among the states that continued to resist Golconda rule were the Matli Chiefs of Cittiveli and Siddavatam which still controlled a considerable territory. In 1649, Mir Jumla II dispatched an expedition against them under the command of Baksi Triambak Rao, accompanied by two Muslim officers.

Kumara Anantaraju II, the ruling chief of Siddavatam defeated the invading Golconda Amry. During the battle the two Muslim officers were beheaded and Baksi Triambak Rao was forced to retreat.

== Aftermath ==
Although Kumara Anantaraju II had initially defeated the Golconda army, he later realised that continued resistance was futile. After consulting his uncle Ellamaraju and his leading officers he decided to abandon Siddavatam and retreat westward to Ikkeri Basavapuram, with his family and relatives. After his departure Siddavatam was conquered by the army of Golconda in 1650. The town was converted into a military base and placed under the administration of Trimbak Rao Sankarji Pant.

== See also ==
- Battle of Talikota
- Ibrahim Quli Qutub Shah Wali
- Ahmednagar Sultanate
