= Siege of Kondavidu =

- Part of Deccani–Vijayanagar wars
Date	29 March 1579–29 April 1580
Location	Kondavidu, Andhra Pradesh, India 16.1516°N 80.1550°E
Result	Golconda victory

Belligerents
Vijayanagar Empire: Velugoti Nayakas; Gobburi chiefs	Golconda Sultanate

Commanders and leaders
Sriranga I Gobburi Timmaraju; Velugoti Timma	Ibrahim Quli Qutb Shah Wali; Haider-Ul-Mulk; Syed Shah Tucky; Murari Rao

Strength
30,000	Unknown
- Location within South Asia

The Siege of Kondavidu (1579–1580) was a military conflict fought between the Golconda Sultanate and the Vijayanagara Empire during Ibrahim Qutb Shah's invasion of the Vijayanagara territories. Golconda army under Haider-ul-Mulk and later Sayyid Shah Tucky besieged the Kondavidu Fort, which was defended by Gobburi Timmaraju and Velugoti Timma. Despite strong resistance, the defence weakened after secret negotiations with Timma Nayaka, who was offered a large bribe. Velugoti Timma surrendered the fort to Murari Rao on 29 April 1580, bringing the Kondavidu region under Golconda Sultanate control.

== Background ==
The Vijayanagara victory against Golconda army at Ahobilam appears to have prompted a strong response from Ibrahim Qutb Shah Wali. After receiving news of their defeat, he sent a large army into the Vijayanagara territories under the command of Haider-ul-Mulk, who may have been an officer under Murari Rao. The expedition was intended to bring the Kondavidu rajya under Golconda Sultanate control.

On Ibrahim Qutb Shah Wali's orders, Haider-ul-Mulk crossed the Krishna River and invaded the smaller states that acknowledged Vijayanagara authority only nominally. He left Golkonda on 29 March 1579 and quickly captured Vinukonda, Kumbum, and Kacharlakota in the Darsi region. At Kacharlakota, the Velama chiefs Velugoti Kasturi Ranga Nayaka and Moodna Chinna were stationed with an army of twenty thousand infantry. They fled on the approach of the Golconda army without offering resistance, allowing the fort to fall easily.

Haider-ul-Mulk then advanced towards Udayagiri in the Nellore region. Its commander Venkataraju attempted to resist the invasion but was defeated, and the fort was captured with little difficulty. With most of the surrounding strongholds now under Golconda Sultanate control, Kondavidu remained the principal stronghold still held by the Vijayanagara army. Haider-ul-Mulk therefore occupied the forts surrounding Kondavidu effectively encircled the fortress and began its siege.

== Siege ==
Kondavidu was defended by Gobburi Timmaraju, the son-in-law of Rama Raya with his lieutenant Velugoti Timma. When Haider-ul-Mulk laid siege to the fort, the two commanders offered strong resistance and prevented the Golconda army from making an immediate breakthrough. Haider-ul-Mulk was therefore forced to request reinforcements from Golconda.

Ibrahim Qutb Shah Wali subsequently replaced him with Sayyid Shah Tucky, who held the title Mir Shah Mir, and ordered him to march to Kondavidu with troops selected from the royal bodyguard and the shiledars. After arriving before the fort, Shah Mir found the defenders prepared to continue the resistance. Fighting continued for several days, followed by a prolonged bombardment of the fort's walls. The change in command and intensified attacks failed to produce the desired result.

Ibrahim Qutb Shah Wali then resorted to a different approach. Murari Rao was instructed to open secret negotiations with Timma Nayaka and offered him a large bribe in return for weakening the defence. The arrangement led to a decline in the defenders' resistance, allowing the Golconda army to breach the fort's walls.

== Aftermath ==
Velugoti Timma eventually surrendered Kondavidu to Murari Rao on 29 April 1580. With the fall of the fort the Kondavidu region came under the control of the Golconda Sultanate.

== See also ==
- Matli Anantaraju
- Akbar
- Kingdom of Mysore
