= Kolhar =

Kolhar may refer to:

== Places in India ==
- Kolhar, Bijapur, a panchayat village, Kolhar taluka
- Kolhar (Old), a village in Kolhar taluka
- Kolhar River, the Kolar River in Nagpur district, Maharashtra

== Fictional ==
- Kolhar (Dune), a planet in Frank Herbert's fictional Dune universe

== See also ==
- Kolar (disambiguation)
- Kohler (disambiguation)
- Kohlar, a Klingon character in the Star Trek: Voyager episode "Prophecy"
