= Siege of Madurai =

- Part of Vijayanagara Campaigns In South
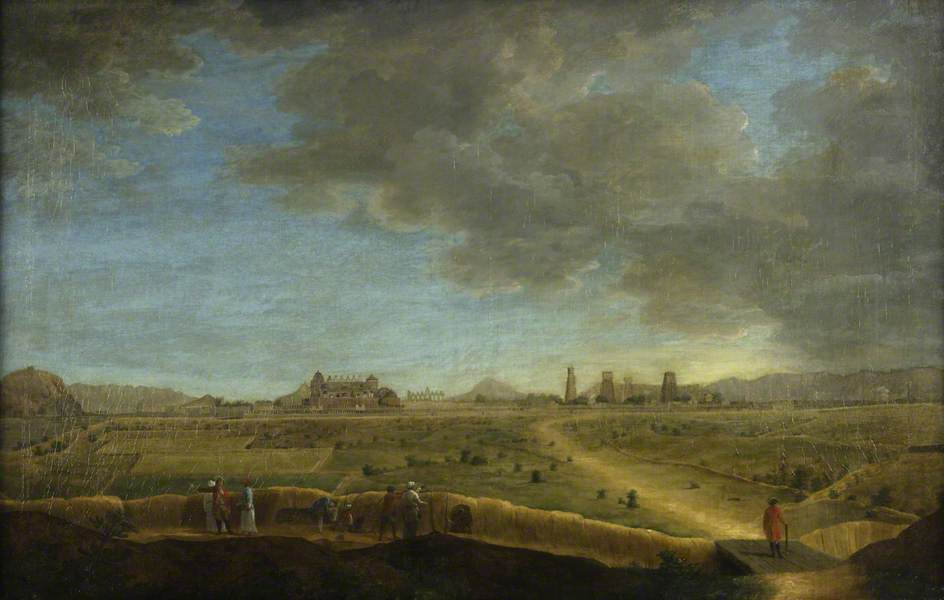
- Painting of Madurai
Date	1595
Location	Madurai, India
Result	Vijayanagar victory
Territorial changes	Muttu Virappa Nayaka acknowledged Venkatapati Raya's Suzerainty

Belligerents
Vijayanagar Empire: Matli Chiefs	Madurai Nayakas

Commanders and leaders
Venkatapati Raya; Matla Anantaraju; Tirumala (AWOL)	Muttu Virappa Nayaka I

The Siege of Madurai was a conflict between Vijayanagara Empire and Madurai Nayaks Venkatapati Raya marched against Virappa Nayaka who had stopped recognizing Vijayanagara authority. The emperor marched with a large army and surrounded Madurai trying to bring the city back under control. The Vijayanagara Army faced difficulties to capture the city because of some Vijayanagara commanders were bribed by Virappa Nayaka which weakened the attack. Venkatapati Raya eventually gained the upper hand. Virappa Nayaka was forced to submit and once again accepted the emperor’s authority.

== Siege ==
In 1595 AD Virappa Nayaka of Madurai rebelled against the Venkatapati Raya of the Vijayanagara Empire. Venkatapati Raya displeased with Virappa’s actions and his refusal to pay tribute marched with a strong army and laid siege to Madurai. The rebellion did not last long as Virappa Nayaka was soon defeated and forced to submit to the emperor. Soon after Virappa was succeeded by Krishnappa Nayaka II who accepted the overlordship of the Vijayanagara ruler Venkatapati Raya.

=== Details of siege in Chikkadevaraya vamsavali ===
The Chikkadevaraya Vamsavali describes how Venkatapati Raya marched with a strong army and laid siege to Madurai after Virappa Nayaka stopped obeying imperial authority. Virappa managed to bribe some of the emperor’s commanders including his nephew Tirumala. Even with these setbacks Venkatapati Raya eventually defeated Virappa Nayaka. The ruler of Madurai had no choice but to submit, and he once again accepted the suzerainty of the Vijayanagara emperor.

== See also ==
- Madurai Nayakas
- Venkatapati Raya
- Vijayanagara Empire
