= Siddeswara kshetram =

Hindu temple in India

Religion
- Affiliation: Hinduism
- District: Annamayya
- Deity: Lord Siddeswara along with Parvathi Ammavaru and Nandi

Location
- Location: Gurramkonda
- State: Andhra Pradesh
- Country: India

Siddeswara Kshetram, popularly known for "Siddeswara Swamy Temple", is an ancient Hindu temple of Lord Siddeswara on the hilltop of Siddeswara Gutta in Gurramkonda in India. It is one of the oldest temples in Annamayya district.

The sanctum sanctorum of the temple has Lord Siddeswara along with Parvathi Ammavaru and Nandi The temple is located on a hilltop.

== History and legend ==
Locals used to celebrate jathara at the time of shivarathri at the temple. The practice was renewed in 2013 and three new idols were placed in the temple.
