= KGF =

KGF or kgf may refer to:

- Keratinocyte growth factor
- King George's Fields, UK recreation grounds
- Kolar Gold Fields, region of gold mines in Karnataka, India
  - Kolar Gold Field (Vidhan Sabha constituency), state assembly constituency
  - KGF School, a school in the area
- KGF (film series), Indian Kannada-language film series about the mines
  - KGF: Chapter 1, 2018 Indian period action film
  - KGF: Chapter 2, 2022 Indian period action film, sequel to the 2017 film
- Sary-Arka Airport, Karaganda, Kazakhstan, IATA code KGF
- Kilogram-force, a non-standard gravitational metric unit

== See also ==
- Kolar (disambiguation)
