= Udayagiri caves =

Udaygiri caves may refer to:

- Udayagiri Caves in Madhya Pradesh, India
- Udayagiri and Khandagiri Caves in Odisha, India

== See also ==
- Udayagiri (disambiguation)
