= Tirupatiraju's Rebellion =

- Part of Rebellion's In Andhra
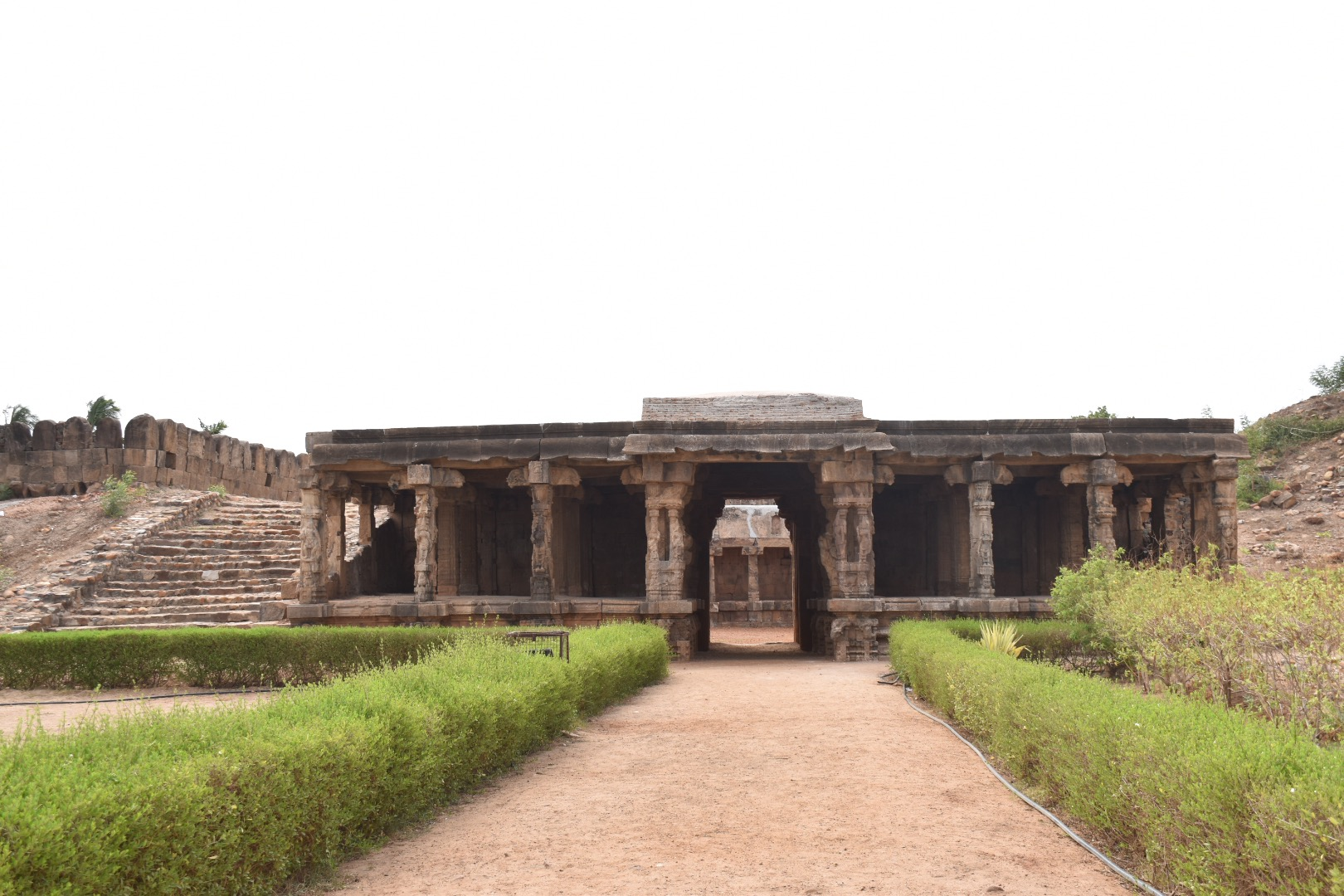
- A monument in Siddavatam Fort
Date	1598
Location	Andhra Pradesh, India
Result	Vijayanagar victory
Territorial changes	Venkatapati Raya captured Siddavatam And Pottapi appointed Ellamaraju as Governor of Siddavatam

Belligerents
Vijayanagara Empire	Chiefs of Siddhavatam

Commanders and leaders
Venkatapati Raya; Matla Ellamaraju; Matla Tirumalaraju; Matla Anantaraju	Kondaraju Tirupatiraju †; Kondaraju Venkatadriraju †

Tirupatiraju’s Rebellion was a rebellion against Vijayanagara Empire the rebellion began soon after the death of Sriranga Deva Raya, when Tirupatiraju tried to rule Siddavatam and Pottapi on his own instead of staying loyal to Venkatapati Raya. He strengthened his position by placing a garrison at Utukur and tried to tighten his control over the whole region. This move angered Venkatapati Raya who saw it as open defiance. The emperor responded by sending Matla Ellamaraja with an army to crush the rebellion. The battle ended with Tirupatiraju’s death outside Utukur and his followers were either defeated or driven out. the rebellion was put down and the entire region was brought under the Vijayanagara Empire control.

== Background ==
After Sriranga Deva Raya passed away Kondaraju Tirupatiraju began to act on his ambition to rule Siddavatam and Pottapi on his own. Around the same time the Matla chief Ellamaraja and his sons chose to support Venkatapati Raya who was then ruling from Chandragiri. there was long standing hostility between Tirupatiraju and the Matla family he moved quickly against them. He seized Pondaluru, Penagalur, Ponnapalli, and several other villages in the Siddavatam and Pottapinadu regions lands that had been held by the Matla chiefs as their amaram estates.

== Rebellion ==
=== Battle of Utukuru ===
Kondraju Tirupatiraju, who controlled the Siddavatam region placed a garrison at Utukuru a village in the Pottapi area to guard it from any attack coming from Pulugula which was under Venkatapati Raya of Chandragiri. Wanting to tighten his control over Pottapi Tirupatiraju personally travelled to Utukuru. to strengthen his authority on the Pottapi region.

Venkatapati Raya sent an army under Matla Ellamaraja to bring Pottapi nadu under his control and to destroy the fort that Kondaraju Tirupatiraju had built at Utukuru. The emperor also promised Ellamaraja the town of Siddavatam and its lands as amaram if he succeeded in capturing it. Ellamaraja joined the Vijayanagara Army and marched straight to Utukuru where Tirupatiraju the governor of Siddavatam sima was staying at the time.

When Ellamaraja tried to enter Utukuru he was met by Kondaraju Tirupatiraju’s forces and a battle took place just outside the village. Tirupatiraju was killed in the battle. Ellamaraja then secured the fort by placing a garrison inside and immediately set out to deal with Tirupatiraju’s followers who were fleeing in three different directions towards Poli, Neladalur, and Kondur. He chased them down before they could escape the region and defeated them at those places. The group that tried to escape through the Pottapi route could not face his attack and hid in the Niru Hills to the north of Pottapi.

=== Battle of Cennur ===
Tirumalaraju, the younger brother of Matla Ellamaraja led another force to Cennur. There he captured the town and executed Kondraju Venkatadriraju who had been ruling the area for Tirupatiraju. After securing Chennur Tirumalaraju moved quickly through the region and brought several nearby districts Kamalapuram, Duvvur, Porumamilla and Badvel under his control. He also subdued the local Manne chiefs and the smaller palems tightening Vijayanagara authority over the whole area.

=== Capture of Siddavatam ===
An inscription left by Matla Anantaraju the son of Matla Ellamaraja, also records Ellamaraja’s capture of Siddavatam. Anantaraju had a wall built around the Siddhesvara shrine and on it he had the story engraved showing how his father took the fort and brought the region under control.

== Aftermath ==
After Matla Ellamaraja defeated Kondaraju Tirupatiraju, Venkatapati Raya rewarded him generously for his service. He granted Ellamaraja Pulugula sima as an amaranayam and also gave him control over Pottapi-nadu and the Siddavatam region which had earlier belonged to the Udayagiri rajya. In addition, Ellamaraja was placed in charge of several important districts Chennur, Duvvur, Kamalapuram, Porumamilla, and Badvel.

== See also ==
- Siege of Penukonda
- Siege of Vellore (1603–1604)
- Venkatapati Raya
