= Kolar Plateau =

Kolar Plateau is a region in the peninsular plateau that lies to the south Karnataka, formerly Mysore state, in Southern India. The famous Kolar gold fields are part of the region.

It is, basically, a dry zone, with abundant scrub vegetation suitable only for Sheep husbandry. It is also famous for silk and milk as many farmers depend on silkworms and cattle for their livelihood. Annual rainfall is similar to Rayalaseema in Andhra Pradesh and north Arcot region. However, south Kolar district region has climate similar to western Bangalore. Since Kolar plateau is covered with valleys, channeling water from one lake to another is possible.

The region produces woolen blankets, leather goods, handloomed silk, pencils and coarse cotton fabrics.
