= Kolar, Bushehr =

Kolar كلر
- Village
- Location within Iran
- Coordinates: 29°52′43″N 50°31′30″E
- Country: Iran
- Province: Bushehr
- County: Ganaveh
- Bakhsh: Central
- Rural District: Hayat Davud

Population (2006)
  - Total: 211
- Time zone: UTC+3:30 (IRST)
  - Summer (DST): UTC+4:30 (IRDT)

Kolar (Persian: كلر, also Romanized as Kolor; also known as Kūlar) is a village in Hayat Davud Rural District, in the Central District of Ganaveh County, Bushehr Province, Iran. As of 2006 census, its population was 211, in 50 families.
