= Kohler (disambiguation) =

Kohler is a surname.

Kohler may also refer to:

== Places ==
- Kohler, Wisconsin
- Little Kohler, Wisconsin
- Kohler Glacier
- Kohler Range

== Companies ==
- Chocolat Kohler

== Other uses ==
- Köhler & Son, London horn makers
- Kohler family of Wisconsin
  - Kohler Co., bathroom and kitchen products
- Köhler disease
