= Kolar =

Kolar may refer to:

== Places ==
=== India ===
- Kolar, Karnataka, a city in India
  - Kolar Assembly constituency
- Kolar district, in Karnataka, India
- Kolar Gold Fields, former gold mines in Karnataka, India
  - KGF (disambiguation)
  - Kolar Gold Field Assembly constituency
- Kolar Plateau, in Karnataka, India
- Kolar Lok Sabha constituency, in Karnataka, India
- Kolar River (Madhya Pradesh), in Madhya Pradesh, India
- Kolar River (Maharashtra), in Maharashtra, India
- Kolar Dam, in Maharashtra, India
- Kolar, Madhya Pradesh, a tehsil in Bhopal district, Madhya Pradesh, India
- Kolar, Basavana Bagewadi, a village in Bijapur district, Karnataka, India
- Kolar, Odisha, a village in Cuttack district, Odisha, India

=== Iran ===
- Kolar, Bushehr, a village in Bushehr Province, Iran
- Kolar, Razavi Khorasan, a village in Razavi Khorasan Province, Iran

== People ==
- Kolar (surname), a surname found among the West and South Slavs (includes a list of people with the name)
- Kolář, a Czech surname and people so named
- Kolár, a Czech and Slovak surname (includes a list of people with the name)

== See also ==
- Kallar (disambiguation)
- Kolhar (disambiguation)
