= Gurramkonda Fort =

- گرمکنڈہ قلعه - గుర్రంకొండ కోట
- Gurramkonda in India
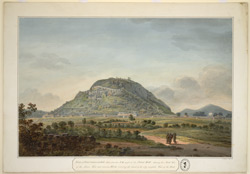
- Gurramkonda Fort

Site information
- Type: Fort
- Owner: Archaeological Survey of India Chittoor
- Operator: ASI Chittoor
- Controlled by: ASI Chittoor
- Open to the public: Public

Location
- Coordinates: 13°46′36.6″N 78°35′10″E

Site history
- Built: 14th Century

Gurramkonda fort is a hill fort in Annamayya district of the Indian state of Andhra Pradesh. It is located in the village Gurramkonda, the mandal headquarters. It is considered one of the oldest forts in the district.

According to sources this fort was built during Vijayanagara Empire and later it came in control of Abdul Khan, the Nawab of Kadapa, in the year 1714 CE.

== History ==
There is a strong fort on the hill. It was built by Vijaya Nagar Empire kings in 14th CE. Even today, it is worthy of visit and mentioning.

== Places to visit ==
1. Rangin Mahal Gurramkonda .
2. Dargah Hazrat Shah Kamal RA
3. Ananta Padmanabha Temple
4. Water pond on the peak of the hill.
5. Syed shah Durgah

== Gallery ==
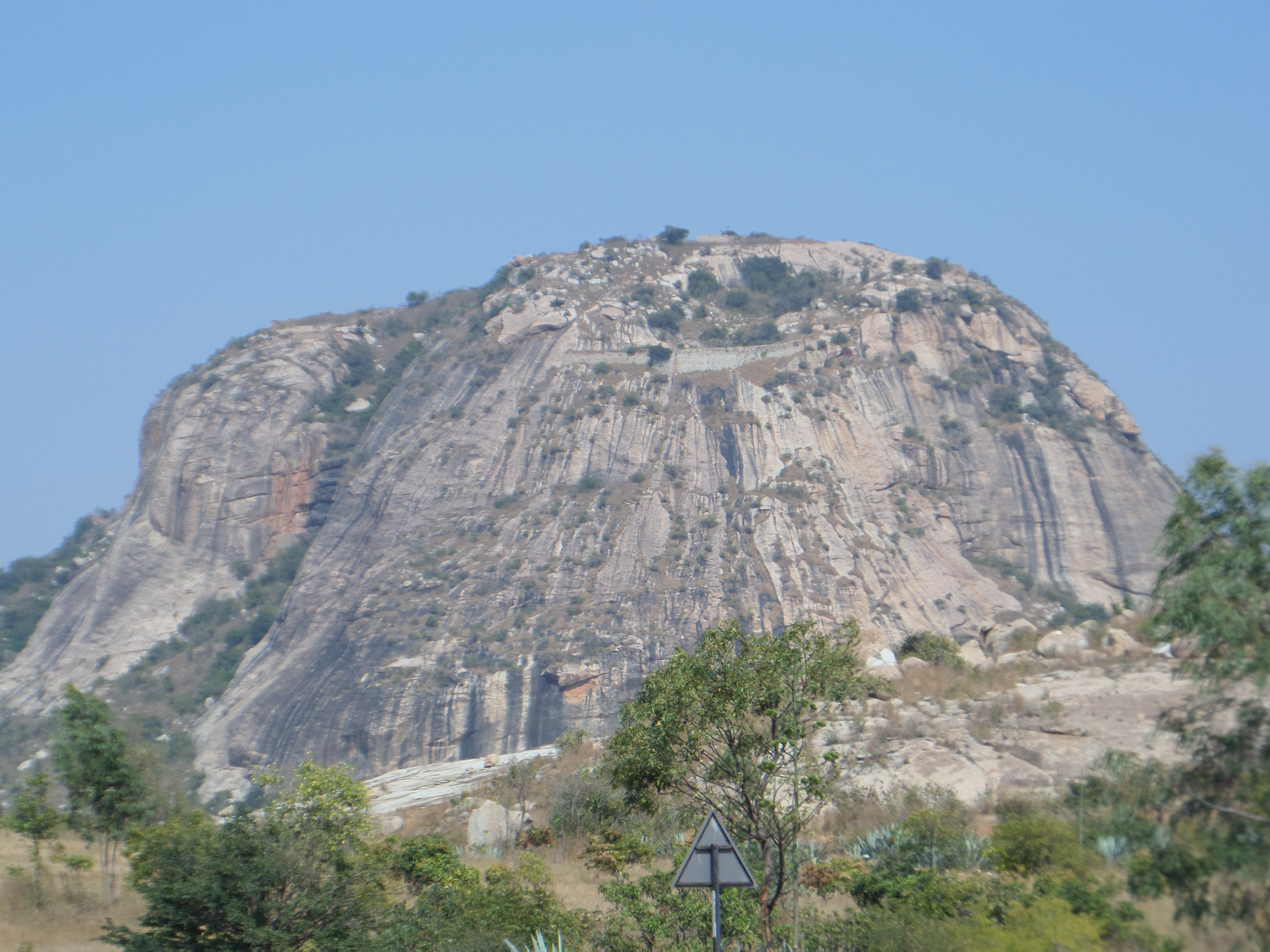
Gurramkonda Hill fort

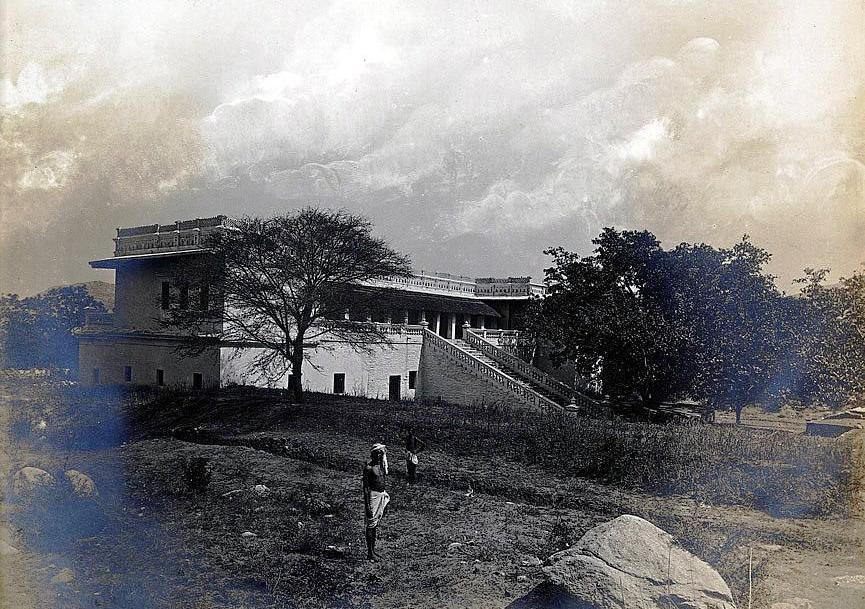
Rangin Mahal

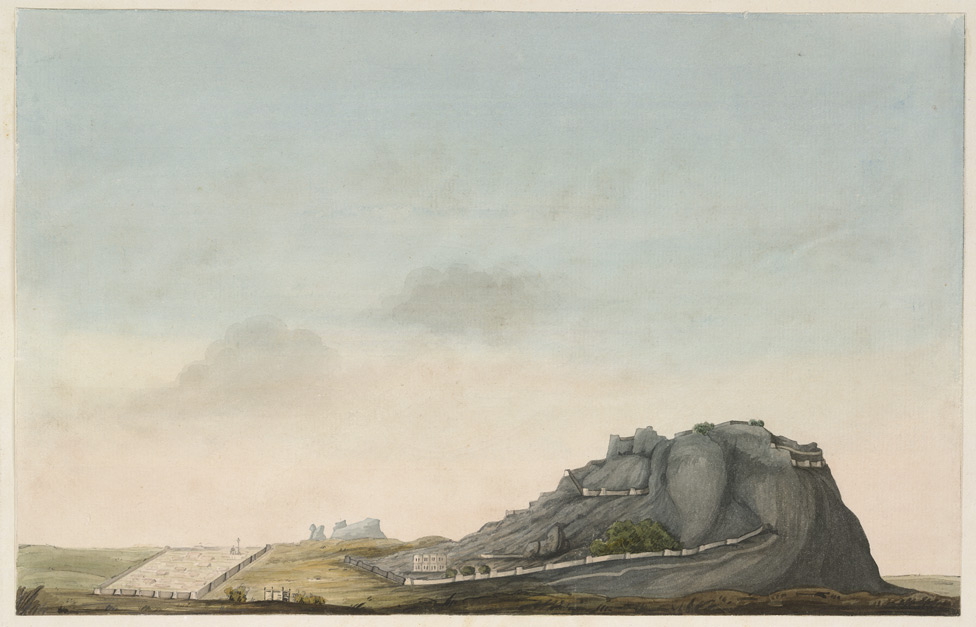
Painting of Gurramkonda fort (British Library)

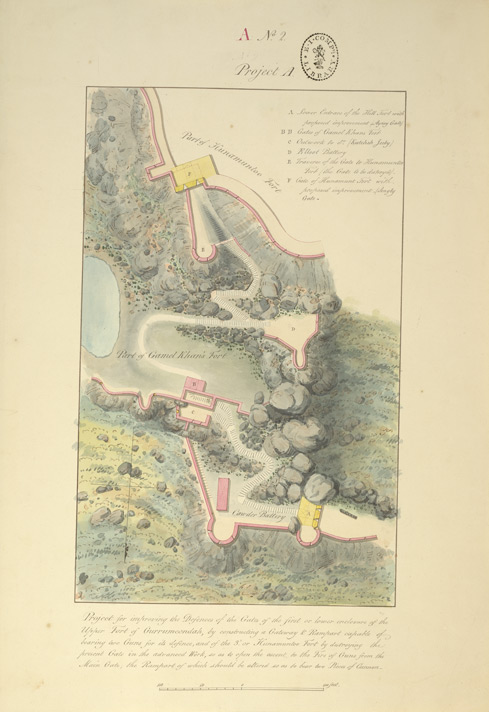
Plan for the Gurramkonda fort gate (British Library)
