= Utukuru =

Village in Andhra Pradesh, India

- Village
- Interactive map of Utukuru
- Location in Andhra Pradesh, India Utukuru (India)
- Coordinates: 17.0202°N 80.4334°E
- Country: India
- State: Andhra Pradesh
- District: NTR
- Mandal: Gampalagudem

Government
  - Type: Gram Panchayat
  - Sarpanch: Bollepogu Renuka

Area
  - Total: 22.82 km^{2} (8.81 sq mi)

Population (2011)
  - Total: 7,633
  - Density: 334.5/km^{2} (866.3/sq mi)

Languages
  - Official: Telugu
- Time zone: UTC+5:30 (IST)

Utukuru is a village located in the Gampalagudem mandal, NTR district of the Indian state of Andhra Pradesh. It is under the administration of Tiruvuru revenue division.

== Demographics ==
According to 2011 census of India, there are a total of 2,068 households. The population is 7,633, with 3,845 males and 3,788 females. Out of the total population, 4,268 are literate, and 3,365 are illiterate. The workforce consists of 4,362 individuals.
