= Udayagiri =

Udayagiri ('udaya' meaning morning and 'giri' meaning peak, Udayagiri translates as the peak on which morning sunlight falls first) is the name of many places in India, among them:

- Udayagiri, Nellore district, a village famous for the hills and ancient buildings in Andhra Pradesh
  - Udayagiri Mandal, a mandal (administrative subdivision) in Andhra Pradesh headquartered at Udayagiri
  - Udayagiri (Assembly constituency), a constituency of Andhra Pradesh Legislative Assembly
- Udayagiri, Mysore, a neighborhood in Mysore, Karnataka
- Udayagiri, Kannur, a village in Thaliparamba taluk of Kannur District in Kerala.
- Udayagiri, Odisha, Buddhist complex in Odisha composed of major stupas and viharas.
- Udayagiri and Khandagiri Caves, the site of ruins of a complex of buildings near Bhubaneswar
- Udayagiri Fort, one in Tamil Nadu and the other in Andhra Pradesh
- Udaygiri Caves, caves near Vidisha in Madhya Pradesh
- G. Udayagiri, a town in Odisha

== See also ==
- Udayagiri caves (disambiguation)
- Udayagiri Raja Maha Vihara, an ancient Buddhist temple in Sri Lanka
