= Utukur =

Village in Andhra Pradesh, India

Utukur Village Gram Panchayath is located in the south-eastern coastal region of India. Utukur is 6 km (3.7 mi) from Sub District Headquarter Sydapuram and it is 48 km (30 mi) from district Headquarter Nellore. The nearest Statutory Town is Gudur in 21 km (13 mi) distance. Utukur's total area is 156.28 ha (386.2 acres), forest area is 290 ha (720 acres), non-agricultural area is 155.06 ha (383.2 acres) and the total irrigated area is 102.43 ha (253.1 acres).
