= Siege of Penukonda =

1590 siege between the Vijayanagara Empire and Golconda Sultanate

- Part of Deccani–Vijayanagar wars
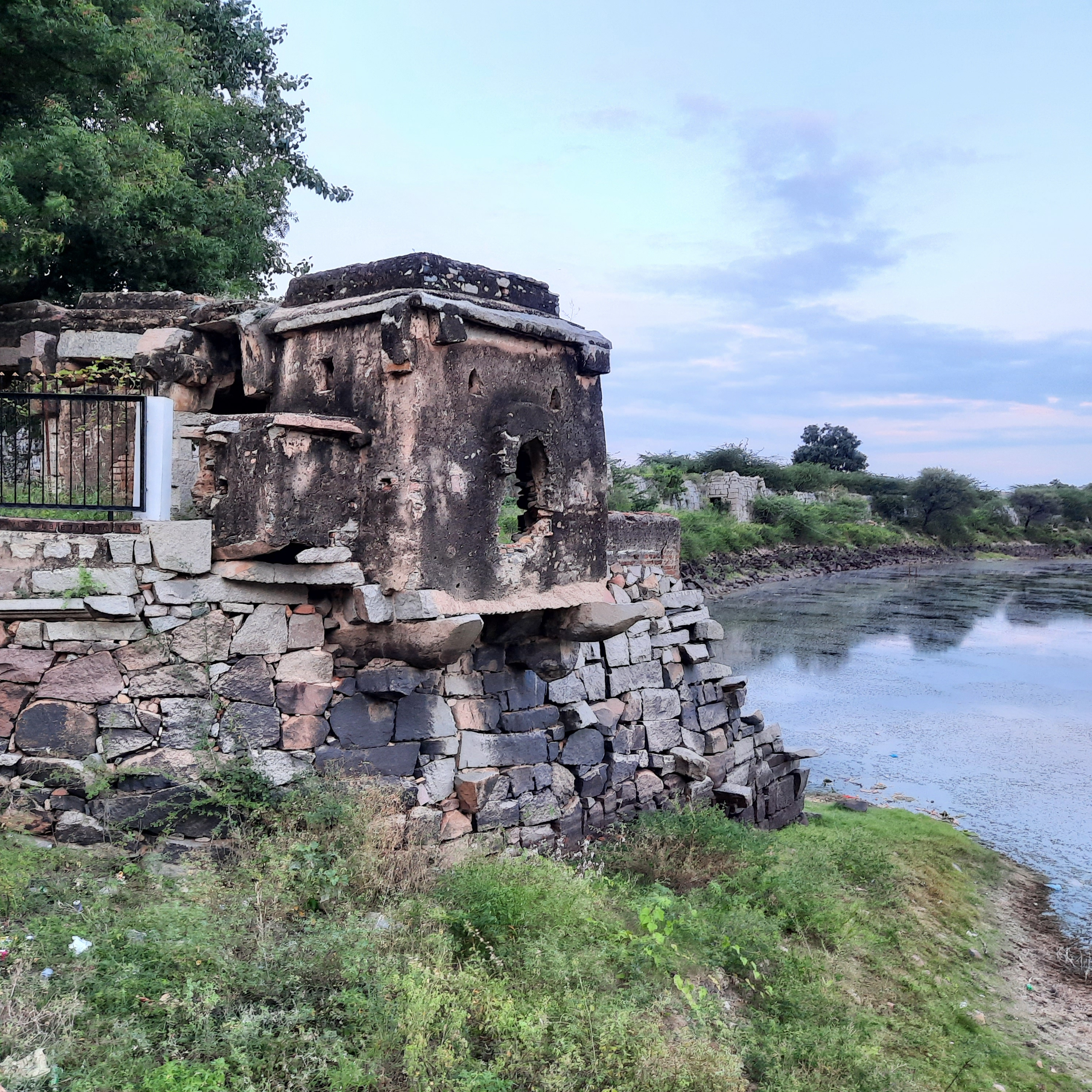
- Penukonda Fort
Date	1590
Location	Penukonda, Andhra Pradesh, India
Result	Vijayanagar victory

Belligerents
Vijayanagara Empire; Supported by: Vijayanagara vassals: Thanjavur Nayaks; Venkatagiri estate; Kalahasti Nayaks; Matli Chiefs	Golconda Sultanate

Commanders and leaders
Venkatapati Raya; Raghunatha Nayaka; Gobburi Jagga Raya; Velugoti Yachama Nayaka; Kasturi Rangappa Nayaka; Velugoti Chenna; Matla Anantaraju; Gulrang Setty; Papayya Samywar; Manupa Raju; Venkatapati	Muhammad Quli Qutb Shah; Aminul-Mulk; Murtaza Khan; Nur Khan; Saujata Khan (executed); Citta Khan (POW); Cerna Mulk

Strength
30,000 Cavalry; 4,000 Musketeers	Unknown

The Siege of Penukonda in 1590 was a conflict between the Vijayanagara Empire and the Golconda Sultanate. Sultan Muhammad Quli Qutub Shah marched to Penukonda which was then the capital of the Vijayanagara Empire and surrounded the city in an attempt to force its surrender. At first the situation looked dangerous for Vijayanagara but Venkatapati Raya used the short peace in fighting to strengthen the fort and bring in a large army for support. When the battle resumed the forces of Vijayanagara defeated the Golconda troops. The Sultan was forced to withdraw ending the siege.

== Background ==
In 1590 A.D, Muhammad Quli Qutub Shah sent his commander Mir Jumla Aminul-Mulk with a strong army to the south. He had learned that Basawanta Raj the son-in-law of Rama Raya and Narasimha Raj, his sister’s son, were controlling the forts of Nandyal and Kalagur and he wanted to remove them from power. Muhammad Quli Qutub Shah later joined the main army and crossed the Krishna River at Musalimudugu. The fort was besieged and soon captured. When Narasimha Raj heard the news he realised resistance would be useless and offered to surrender if he and his family were allowed to leave safely. The Sultan agreed and protected both his family and his property. Soon after Basawanta Raj left Nandyala and the nearby chiefs also submitted willingly agreeing to pay tribute in return for keeping their lands. This campaign led to the occupation of the forts of Gooty, Kurnool, and Gandikota.

== Siege ==
After capturing Gandikota, Sultan Muhammad Quli Qutub Shah joined his army and prepared to take action against Venkatapati Raya believing that the emperor had broken certain treaty agreements. To punish him the Sultan marched towards Penukonda which was then the capital of the Vijayanagara Empire. He faced almost no resistance along the way and reached the city quickly. Once there he surrounded Penukonda and laid siege to it.

At this time Venkatapati Raya was unable to organize a strong defence against the sudden invasion and he could not gather his forces quickly enough to stop the advancing army. To gain time he chose to negotiate and sent his minister Goparaju Timma and his general Papayya Setty to the Sultan’s camp to ask for peace. They spoke with Muhammad Quli Qutub Shah and succeeded in obtaining a temporary truce while discussions for a permanent agreement were arranged. Satisfied with the outcome of his campaign the Sultan withdrew from the area around Penukonda with his army.

Venkatapati Raya made full use of the short peace he had gained. In just three days he supplied the citadel with enough food and materials for the garrison to withstand a long siege. On the fourth day a large force entered the fort including thirty thousand cavalry and four thousand musketeers under the leadership of Gobburi Jagga Raya, Gulranga Setti, Manupa Raju, Papiah Samywar, Raghunatha Nayaka, Matla Ananta, Velugoti Kasturi Ranga, Velugoti Chenna, and his son Venkatapati. With the fort fully prepared and his army strengthened Venkatapati Raya dropped all signs of submission and openly challenged the invading Golconda army.

Sultan Muhammad Quli Qutub Shah realized his mistake only after it was too late. When he tried to renew the siege he found that the fort was now strongly defended and his efforts were useless. The rainy season was also close and the rising waters of the Krishna River made it risky for him to continue the siege as his army could be cut off from their own territory and he decided to withdraw. Contemporary Hindu records say that a battle was fought with the forces of Golconda before the retreat and the Vijayanagara army won the battle.

The Siddhout inscription of Matla Ananta dated 1605–06 states that Ananta defeated the Muhammadan king in the battle of Penugonda and this is supported by the Raghunathabhyudayam which says that the young Tanjore prince Raghunatha Nayaka helped Venkatapati Raya and scattered the Golconda forces. Because of this defeat Muhammad Quli Qutub Shah was forced to lift the siege of Penugonda. Although not much detail is known about the battle, it is recorded that Gobburi Jagga Raya led a sudden attack from the fort and fought with the armies of Murtuza Khan and Nur Khan. In the fighting he defeated their troops captured Citta Khan, killed Saujata Khan, and protected Cerna Mulk.

== Aftermath ==
As a result of the defeat Sultan Muhammad Quli Qutub Shah gave up the siege and retreated quickly toward his frontier. Before crossing the Krishna River he made hurried plans to hold the areas he had captured. He placed Gandikota under the control of Sanjar Khan, Nandyala under Jagat Row, and Musalimadugu under Asva Row. He also appointed Murtaza Khan as the military commander of the conquered region. After making these arrangements the sultan returned to his capital.

== See also ==
- Muhammad Quli Qutub Shah
- Gobburi Jagga Raya
- Golconda Sultanate
