= Gurramkonda =

- Village Gurrumonda
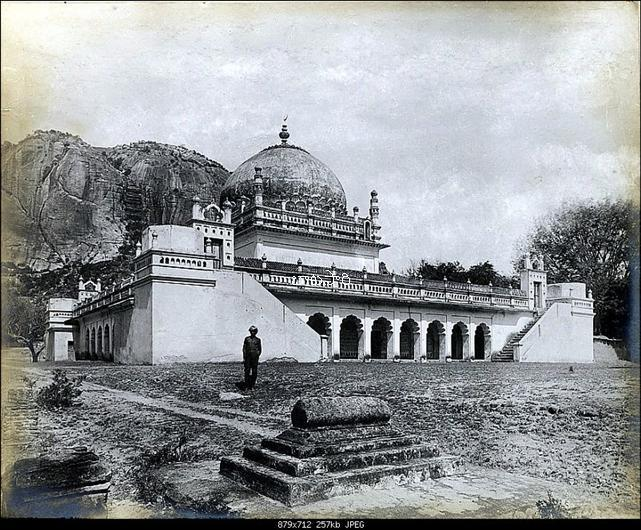
- Nawab Mir Raza Ali Khan's tomb, Maqbira, Gurramkonda
- Interactive map of Gurramkonda
- Location in Andhra Pradesh, India
- Coordinates: 13°46′56″N 78°35′24″E
- Country: India
- State: Andhra Pradesh
- District: Annamayya
- Mandal: Gurramkonda

Population
  - Total: 15,158

Languages
  - Official: Telugu
- Time zone: UTC+5:30 (IST)
- Postal code: 517297
- Vehicle registration: AP 03, AP 39
- Nearest Cities: Madanapalle, Rayachoti
- Assembly Constituency: Pileru
- Lok Sabha Constituency: Rajampeta

Gurramkonda is a village in Annamayya district of the Indian state of Andhra Pradesh. It is the Mandal headquarters of Gurramkonda Mandal. Gurramkonda Fort is one of the oldest fort in the district. Gurramkonda (village) is a village in the Gurramkonda Mandal of the state of Andhra Pradesh, Annamayya district.

As per the 2011 census of India, the village covers 3111 hectares with 2501 houses and a population of 10642. The number of males in the village is 5480, the number of females is 5162. The Scheduled Castes population is 511 and the Scheduled Tribes population is 126.

== See also ==
- Gurramkonda Fort

== Transport ==
The National Highway 340 passes through the village.
