= Kamalakur =

- Village
- Location in Andhra Pradesh, India Kamalakur (India)
- Coordinates: 14.47°N 78.92°E
- Country: India
- State: Andhra Pradesh
- District: Y.S.R Kadapa

Government
  - Governing body: Village Sarpanch
- Elevation: 138 m (453 ft)

Population (2001)
  - Total: 1,200

Languages
  - Official: Telugu
- Time zone: UTC+5:30 (IST)
- PIN: 516227
- Telephone code: 91-8569
- Vehicle registration: AP04
- Website: na

Kamalakur is located in Kadapa district, Andhra Pradesh, India about 10 km from Badvel.
