= Duvvur =

- Village
- Interactive map of Duvvur
- Location in Andhra Pradesh, India Duvvur (India)
- Coordinates: 14.8333°N 78.6500°E
- Country: India
- State: Andhra Pradesh
- District: Kadapa

Languages
  - Official: Telugu
- Time zone: UTC+5:30 (IST)
- Vehicle registration: AP

Duvvur is a village in Kadapa district of the Indian state of Andhra Pradesh. It is located in Duvvur mandal of Jammalamadugu Revenue Division.

== Geography ==
Duvvuru is located at 14.8333°N 78.6500°E. It has an average elevation of 146 meters (482 feet).
