= Gandikota =

- Historical site, Archaeological Survey of India
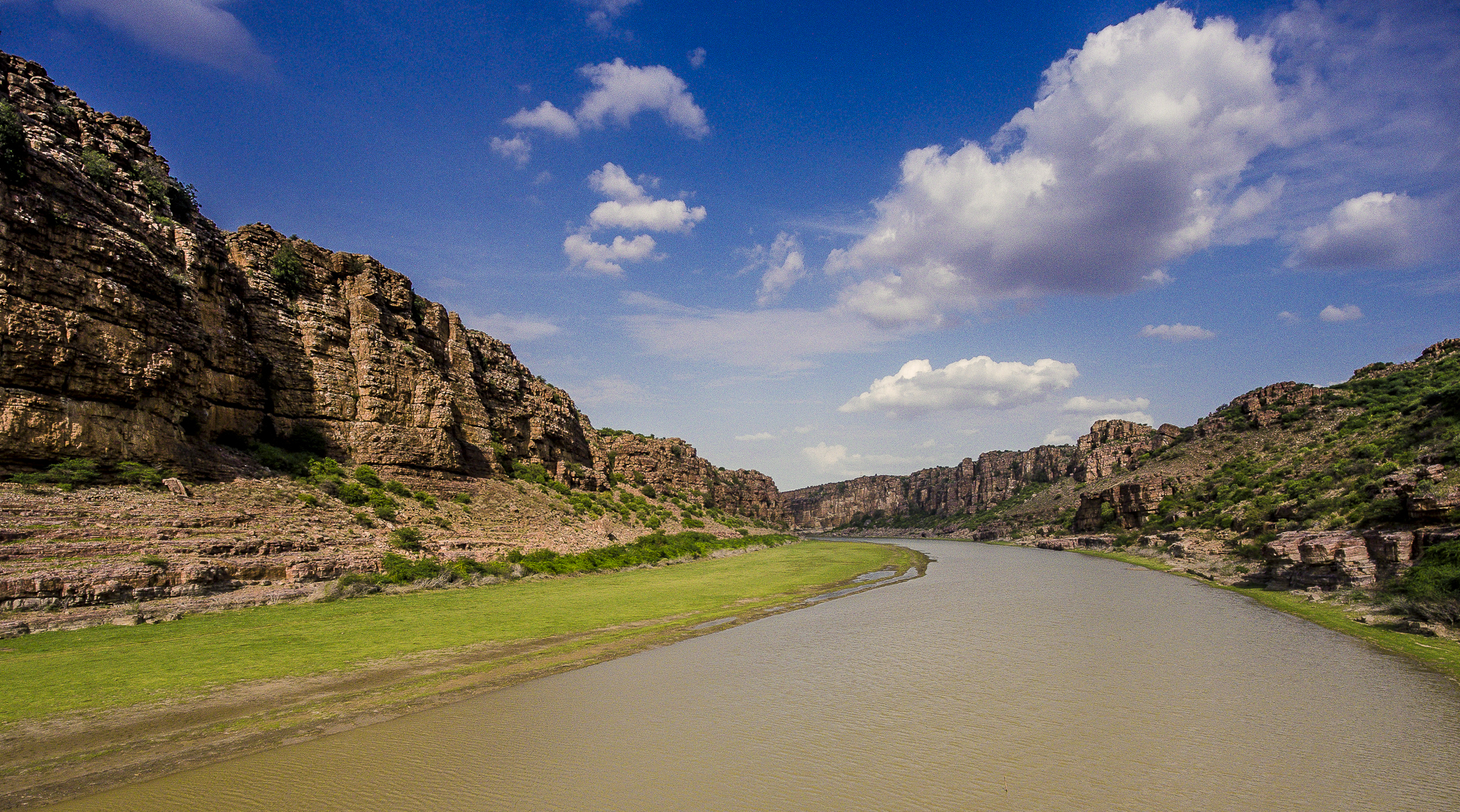
- Gandikota Gorge
- Interactive map of Gandikota
- Location in Andhra Pradesh, India
- Coordinates: 14°48′53″N 78°17′12″E
- Country: India
- State: Andhra Pradesh
- Established: 12th Century A. D.
- Founder: Kaka Raja, subordinate of Kalyani Chalukya dynasty (small sand fort); Pemmasani Ramalinga Nayudu, (101 towers huge rock fort)

Languages
  - Official: Telugu
- Time zone: UTC+5:30 (IST)
- PIN: 516434
- Telephone code: 08560
- Vehicle registration: AP04
- Website: aptdc.gov.in

Gandikota is a village and historical fort on the right bank of the Penna river, 15 km from Jammalamadugu in Kadapa district, Andhra Pradesh, India. The fort was the centre of power for various dynasties, such as the Kalyani Chalukyas, Pemmasani Nayakas, and the Golconda Sultanate. Initially, a sand fort was constructed by Kaka Raja, a vassal of the Kalyani Chalukya rulers. The village transformed into a major fortified settlement with the rise of the Pemmasani Nayakas. Later, various additions reflecting Islamic architectural styles were made during the period of Muslim rule. The fort is a centrally protected monument of Archaeological Survey of India (ASI).

== Etymology ==
The fort of Gandikota acquired its name due to the 'gorge', formed between the Erramala range of hills, also known as Gandikota hills and the river Penna (Pennar) that flows at its foot, reducing its width to a mere 100 m (look for the river image in the montage/main image).

== Geology ==
Gandikota canyon consists of sedimentary rocks, namely 'Gandikota Quartzite' in the Chitravati Group part of Cuddapah Supergroup. The Chitravati Group consists of three formation rank units: the Pulivendla Quartzite; the Tadpatri Formation; and the Gandikota Quartzite.

== History ==
=== Early history ===
Gandikota is a village on the right bank of the river Penna, 15 km from Jammalamudugu in Kadapa district, Andhra Pradesh, India. Gandikota area was first identified and made Sand fort in 1123 by Kakatiya Raja of nearby Bommanapalle village and a subordinate of Ahavamalla Someswara I, Kalyani Chalukya ruler. Gandikota came under the rule of Kakatiya dynasty from 1239 A.D to 1304 A.D and ruled by their various subordinates.

The village transformed into major fort after the emergence of Pemmasani Nayakas.

Recently, Tavva Obul Reddy, a Mydukur-based historian, discovered a copper plate inscription on the history of Gandikonda Fort. The inscription dates back to 16th century.

Vemana poet, native of Kadapa district and believed to have lived in Gandikota area for a short period. Jean Baptiste Tavernier visited the fort during his travel to Golconda sultanate.

== Major structures ==
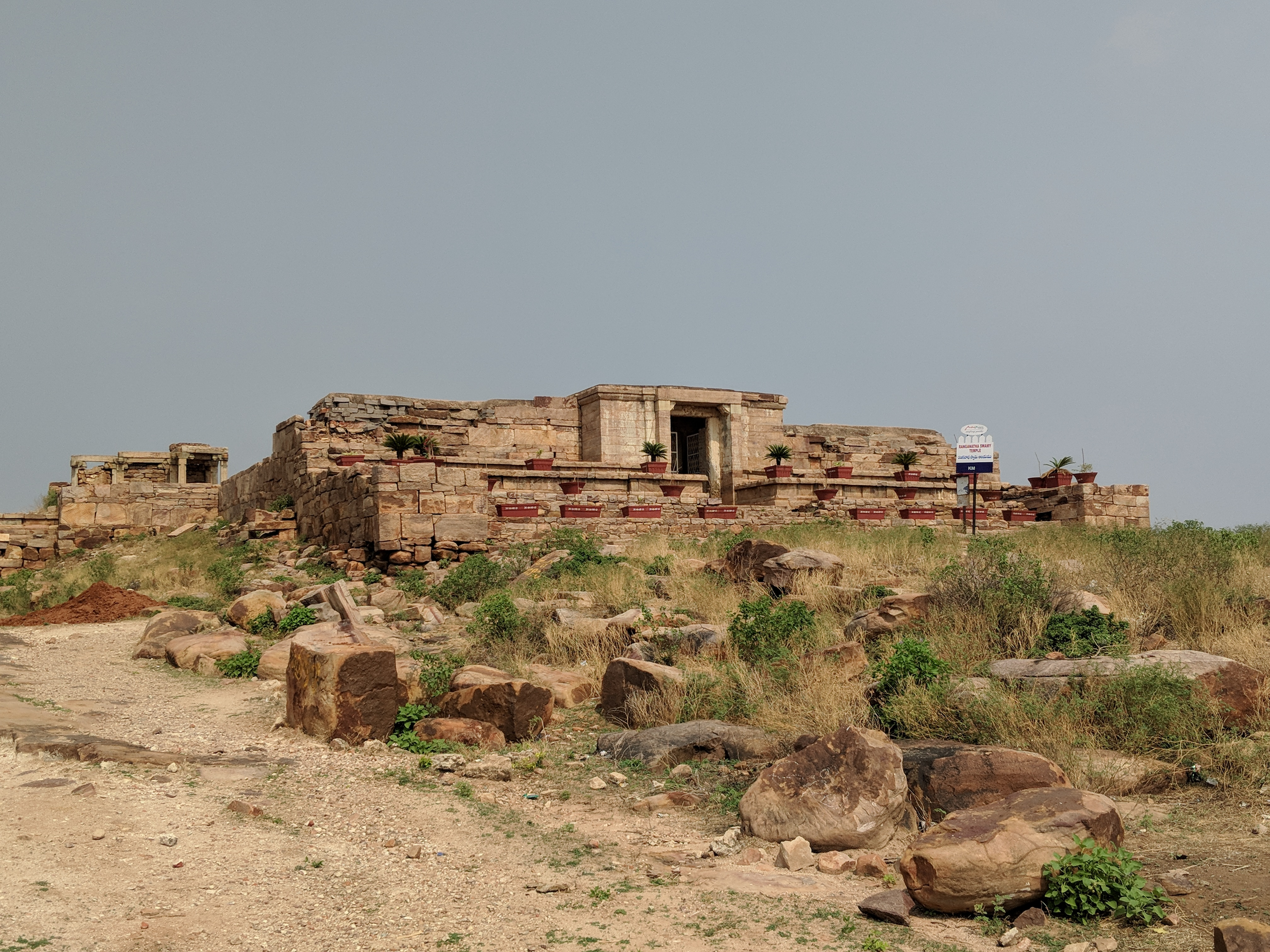
Ranganatha Swamy Temple

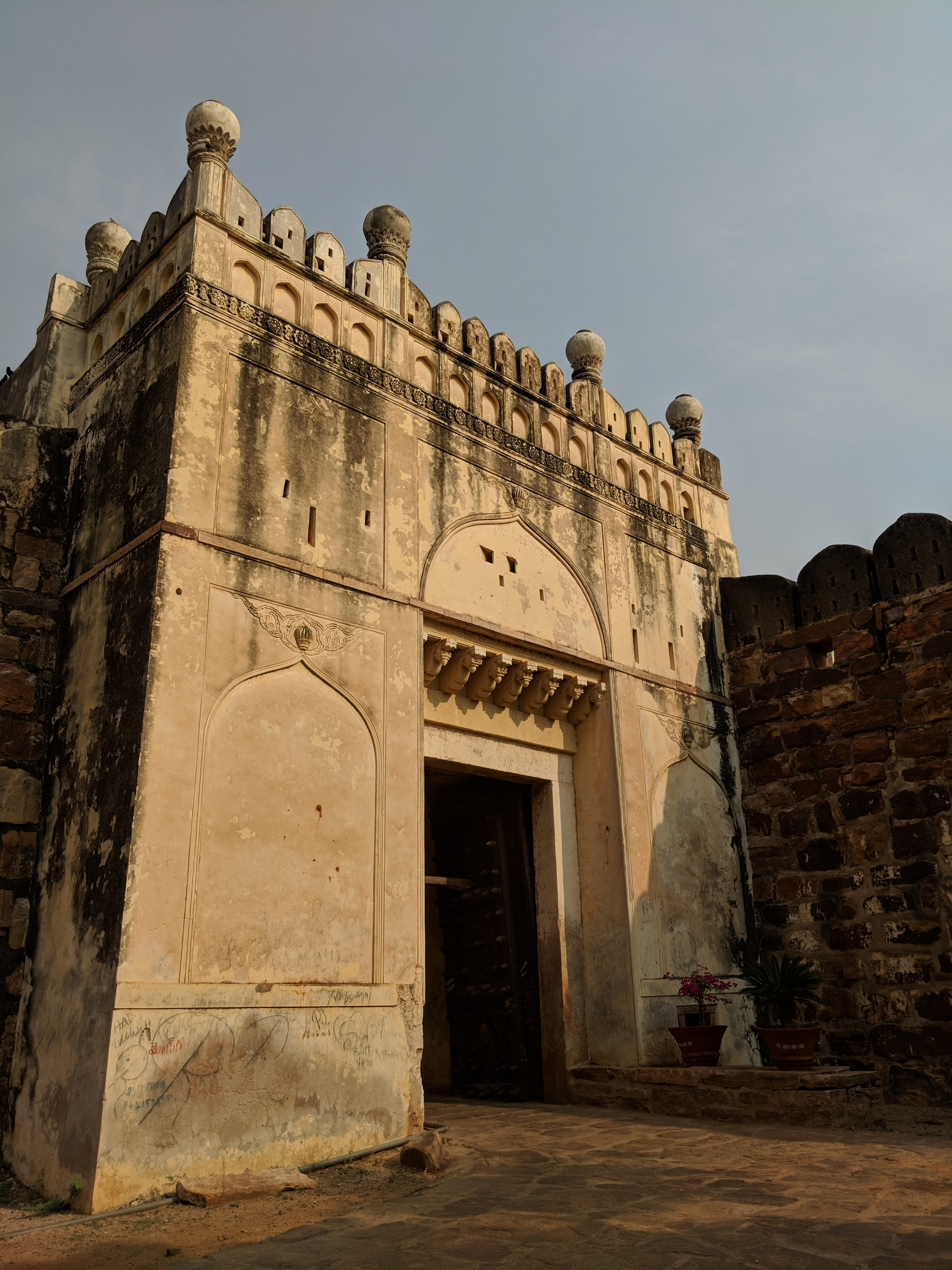
Gandikota Fort Entrance

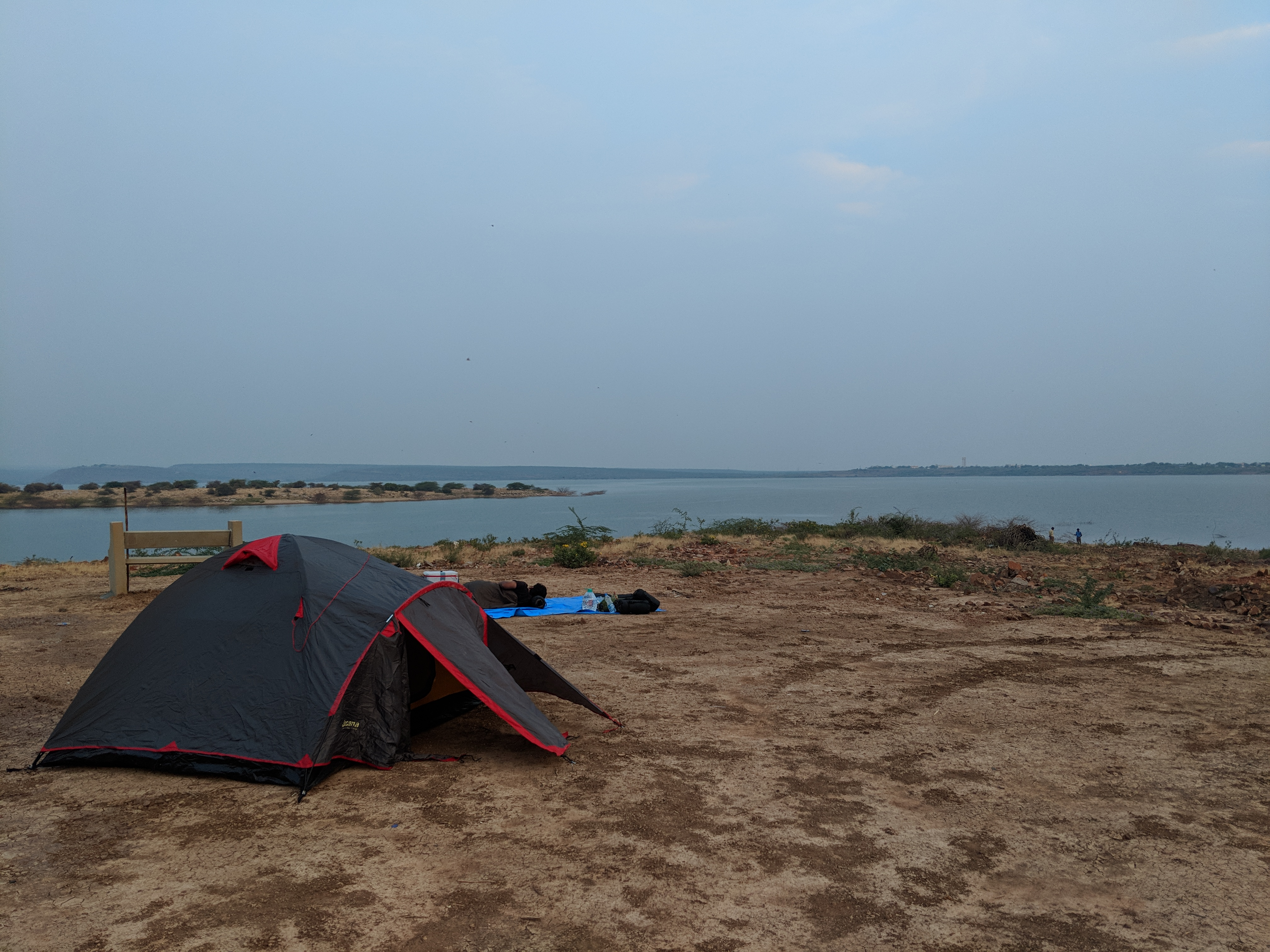
Camping on the banks of Penna (Pennar) river

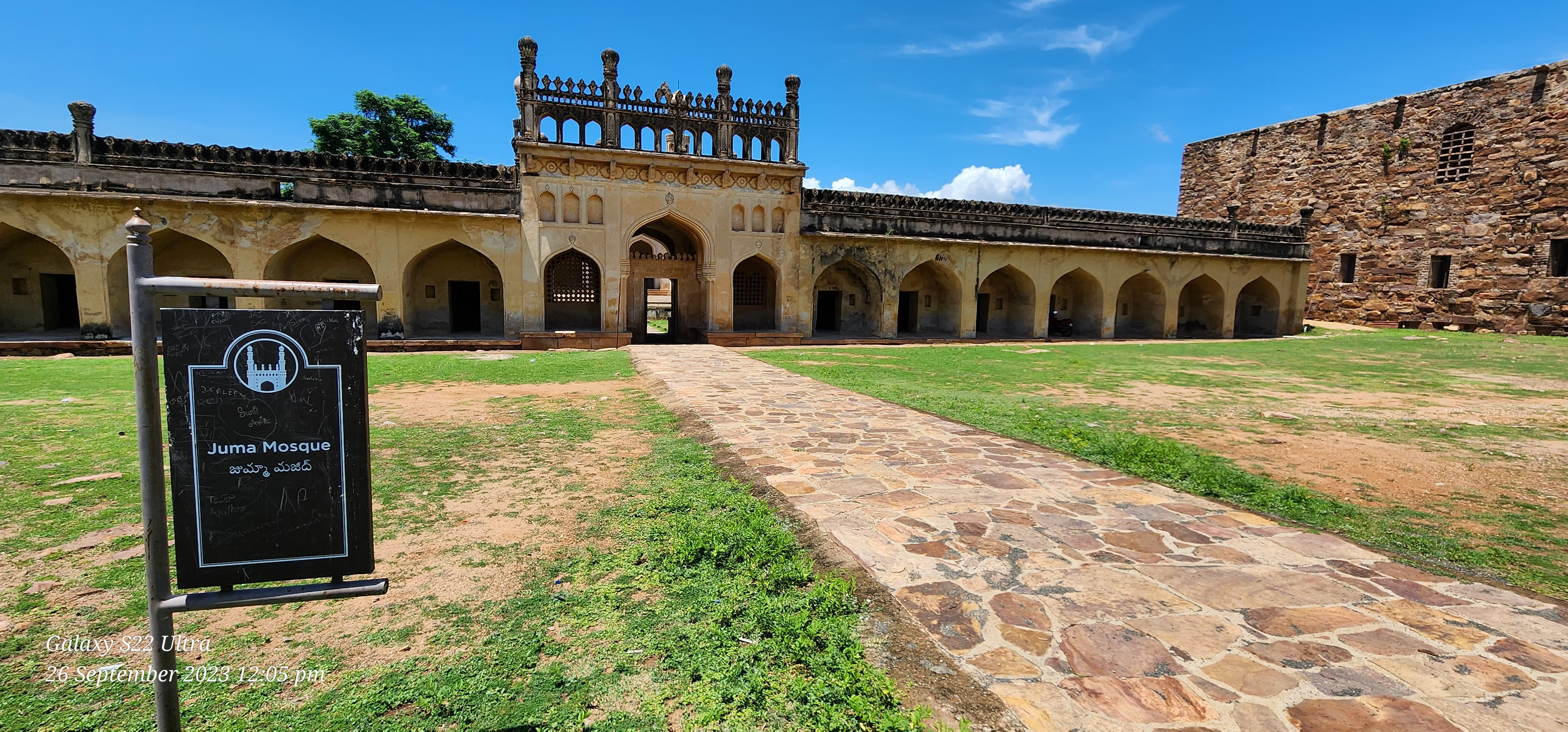
Juma masjid

In the fort are two ancient temples, dedicated to Madhava and Ranganatha. They are in ruins and the fort area is full of the debris of ages and many ancient structures in varying stages of decay. The large granary, with a vaulted roof, is now used as watchman's quarters. The Jamia Masjid has two adjacent minarets. A heritage festival is held every year in the fort area.

The other structures in the fort, include another large granary (used for storing food and grains late back), a magazine, a graceful 'pigeon tower' with fretted windows and an extensive palace built by bricks with some plastered decorations and some wells. There is an old cannon lying in the fort. There is the 'Rayalacheruvu' with its perennial springs irrigating some lime and plantain gardens. It is said that this 'Cheruvu' was connected to a fountain in Jamia Masjid by pipes, traces of which can still be seen.

There were other gardens and springs. There is an undated inscription on a boulder, near the 'Nagajhari' outside the fort, recording the gift of two gardens at the place to the temple. There was a garden called 'Parebagh' with a waterfall at the foot of the hills, on the bank of the Penneru.

There are multiple camping areas outside the Fort and on the banks of the Penna (Pennar) river.

The other main attractions at the fort includes House of the Drum (drums were used to alert the army in case of invasion), Charminar, Jail (where in the prisoners were held captive) and Red Koneru (Also known as pond of Swords, The huge lake in front of the mosque, where the warriors used to dip their swords in this lake and the waters used to turn blood red after the war).

== Access and transportation ==
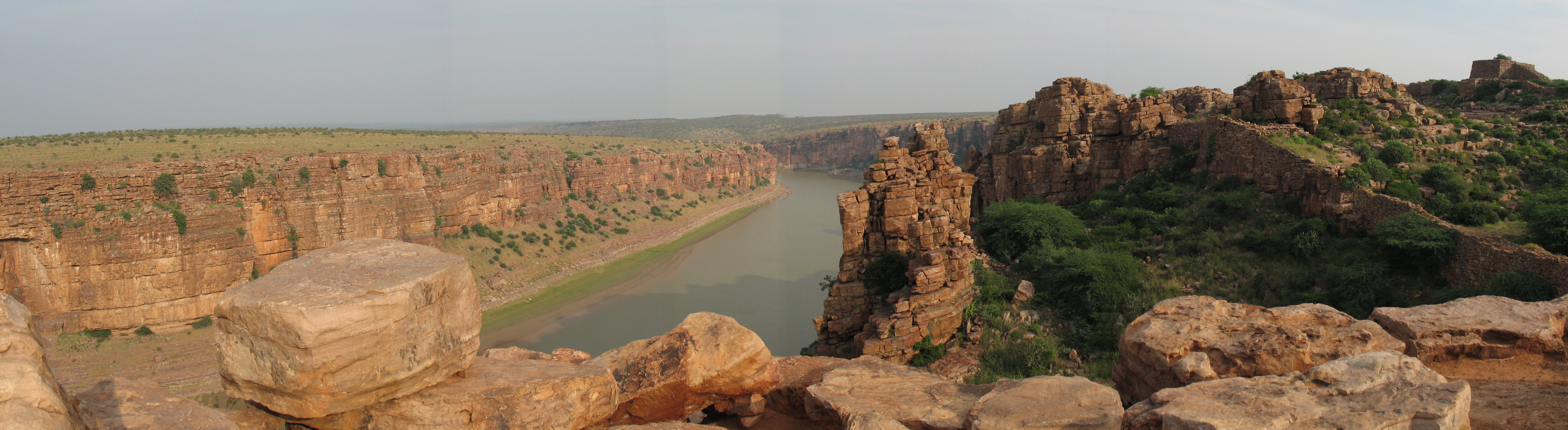
Panoramic view of Penna river near Gandikota

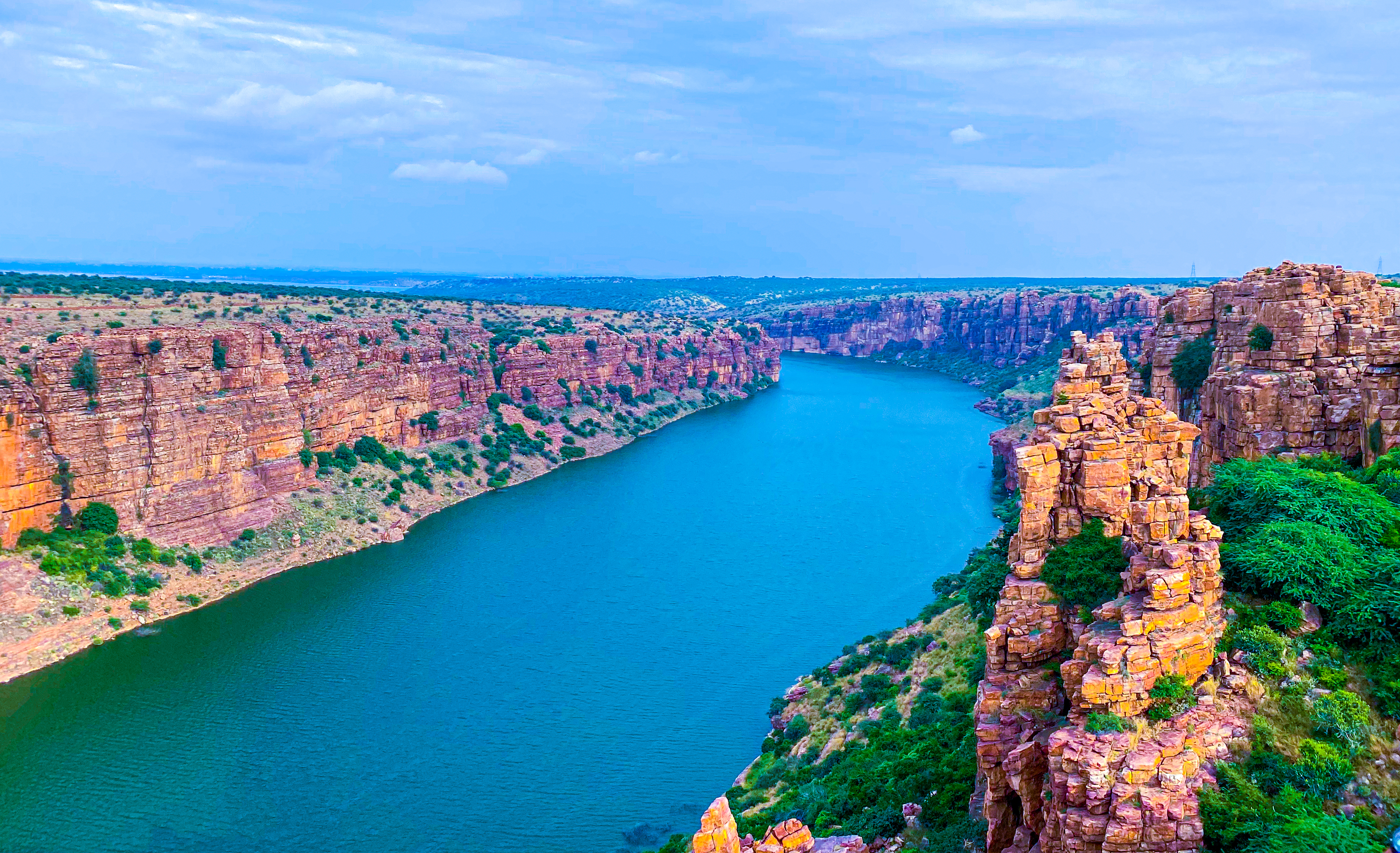
Gandikota Canyon

The nearest railway stations are Muddanuru which is 26 km (railway code: MOO) and Jammalamadugu (JMDG) in Kadapa District. There are number of trains from Gooty Junction. Recently the town of Jammalamadugu which is closest to Gandikota fort also got railway connectivity due to the completion of Nandyal–Yerraguntla section railway line. However frequency of trains on this line is very low.

There are buses available from Jammalamadugu Old Bus Stand (Gandhi Statue Junction) to Gandikota.

Inside the fort there is no means of transportation except to walk by foot. There is a good downhill trek through the canyon that leads to the riverbed. There is a dam upstream (Gandikota Dam) and a dam downstream (Mylavaram Dam).

There is a Haritha hotel run by Andhra Pradesh Tourism department which has lodging facilities. However the facilities are limited during the weekdays as the visitors during weekdays are low.

== Tourism ==
Gandikota has been referred to as "the Grand Canyon of India."

The Andhra Pradesh government announced an investment of three crore rupees towards tourism development in Gandikota.
