= Matli Chiefs =

Medieval Kadapa ruling clan

The Matla Chiefs (also spelled Matli) were a family of regional chieftains who ruled parts of the Cuddapah district (modern-day Kadapa) in Andhra Pradesh, India. They held sway primarily over the region of Siddhavatam and were active from at least the early 16th century until the early 19th century. The family's political influence, martial involvement, and local governance are documented through inscriptions and historical accounts.

== Historical background ==
The Matla chiefs ruled over Siddhavatam and surrounding areas including Jammalamadugu, Cuddapah, and parts of Chitveli. Inscriptions and kaifiyats refer to this family under various forms—Matla, Matli, and Metla—and identify them as having a long-standing local presence. Some members of the family assumed the title of Raja, and their territory was occasionally regarded as a semi-independent principality.

The family is recorded in inscriptions as claiming descent from the Deva-Choda lineage of the Solar race. A prominent member of the lineage, Matli Varadaraju, is described in an inscription at the Varadaraja temple in Kanchipuram as the son of Somaraja and a chief of the Matli family. He was married to Krishnamma, daughter of Emperor Krishnadevaraya, and is referred to by honorifics such as Kaveri-Vallabha, Katikasurahara, and Gajasimha. He is also recorded as a donor to the Vishnu shrine at Tirupati around A.D. 1544.

One of the earliest documented chiefs mentioned in regional kaifiyats is Matla Anantaraju, who held military and administrative authority in Siddhavatam. He is also associated with temple-building and the issuing of land grants. Another notable figure was Tirumalaraju, who is mentioned in epigraphic records related to Penagaluru. He converted that village into an agrahara and gifted it to Brahmins.

== Military role and governance ==
The Matla chiefs were actively involved in the regional politics of the time, participating in campaigns and resisting rival chieftains. They maintained a fort at Siddhavatam, which served as their primary base. According to historical records, the fort eventually came under siege by the British when the region was ceded to them by the Nizam of Hyderabad. The Matla family was among the last to resist British occupation in the area.

== Involvement in Gandikota affairs ==
The Matla chiefs played a role in the political history of Gandikota during the late 16th century. According to historian Yellapragada Sriramamurty, Matli Ellamaraju supported the imperial forces of Venkata II in suppressing a rebellion by Nandela Krishnamaraja at the fort of Gandikota. At the Battle of Jambulamadugu, Ellamaraju fought alongside Pemmasani Timmanayaka against the rebel chieftain, who was ultimately defeated and taken captive. As a reward for their support, the fort of Gandikota and its adjoining territory were granted to Matli Ellamaraju and Pemmasani Timmanayaka.

Another chief, Matli Kumara Anantaraja, was involved in a territorial conflict with Pemmasani Timmanayudu, the governor of Gandikota. A peace agreement was reached in which Chilamkuru (Duvvuru Taluk) was established as the boundary between their estates. The land to the east was allotted to Matli Kumara Anantaraja, while the western part was assigned to Pemmasani Timmanayudu.

== Decline ==
With the transfer of Rayalaseema to the British in the early 19th century, the political autonomy of the Matla chiefs declined. The fort at Siddhavatam was captured after a prolonged siege, marking the end of the family's regional rule.

== Legacy ==
The history of the Matla chiefs is preserved in epigraphs, kaifiyats, and colonial-era district records. While their prominence has diminished in modern historical discourse, they played a significant role in the local governance, temple patronage, and socio-political dynamics of Cuddapah district over several centuries.
