= Siddavatam =

- Village
- Sidhout
- Interactive map of Siddavatam
- Location in Andhra Pradesh, India
- Coordinates: 14.4667°N 78.9698°E
- Country: India
- State: Andhra Pradesh
- District: Kadapa
- Mandal: Sidhout

Languages Telugu,urdu
- Time zone: UTC+5:30 (IST)
- Postal Index Number: 516237

Siddhavatam is a village in Kadapa district of the Indian state of Andhra Pradesh. It is located in Sidhout mandal of Kadapa revenue division.

This village was initially under the rule of Matli Kings. As the Muslim rulers ruled the South India, it was then brought under the control of the Nawab of Cuddapah. With the advent of British, it was ceded to them by the Nawab. Under the rule of British, Siddavatam served as the headquarters of the district briefly. Currently the city of Cuddapah serves as the headquarters and Siddavatam was reduced to a mandal in the district.

== Geography ==
Siddhavattam is located at 14.4667°N 78.9698°E. It has an average elevation of 111 meters (354 feet). It is located on the left bank of river Penna on the route to Badvel from Kadapa at a distance of about 25 km.

== Etymology ==
It was said that this place used to be inhabited by people who wanted to meditate in the sereneness of climate and had a thick canopy of Indian Banyan trees which served as shades for them. In Sanskrit, Sidda means people who perform meditation and vata is the Indian Banyan tree. Hence, the name Siddavatam is said to be a portmanteau of two words Sidda + vatam.

== History ==
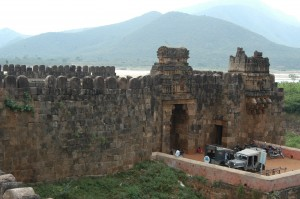
Siddavatam Fort

Siddavatam Fort was constructed by Matti Raja, a Tuluva dynasty feudatory chief to the Vijayanagara Empire, in 1303 CE. It lies on the banks of the Pennar River. The fort extends over an area of 30 acres (12 ha). Visitors can view gateways and decorated pillars at the two ends of the fort. Top of the fort has been adorned with carvings of Gajalakshmi. It is noteworthy that the 17 bastions which once used to protect the region are still visible in the fort.

The fort houses an ancillary passage which allows the visitors to gain access even after the closure of the main gates. It is considered as the gateway to Dakshina Kashi. The temples and masjid present inside its premise include the Ranganatha Swamy Temple.

The fort here was much developed under the rule of king Varadha Raju, who is the son-in-law of Sri Krishna Deva Raya. This fort was just a mud fort at the time the area was ruled by "Matli Rajulu". Later it came under the control of Varadha Raju.

Earlier it was a part of Udayagiri Kingdom. Matli Yellama Raju used to support the second Venkatapathi Rayalu in many wars. For this favour, Siddavatam was given to Matli Yellama Raju as a gift along with some other places. Later Matli Anantha Raju remodelled the fort as Rock Fort.

Later Aurangzeb's commander Mir Jumla II in 1682 along with shah nawaz khan captured Siddavatam along with other places in the region. Later Aarkatu Nawabs occupied the town. In 1714 Abdul Nabi Khan, who was ruling Kadapa conquered Siddavatam. This place was also ruled by Mayana Nawabs for some period. In 1799, it went into the hands of British East India Company.

From 1807 to 1812 Siddavatam was the district headquarters. However, since it is on the bank of river Penna, every time there was a flood, the place was marooned from other places of the district giving rise to administerial difficulties and subsequently the district headquarters was shifted to Kadapa.

== Climate ==
Siddavatam has a tropical climate as is the encompassing region of Rayalaseema. The summers have temperatures ranging between 37°C and 45°C and normally occurs between the months of April and July.

During monsoons the climate starts to cool down and the river swells up during the rains which could sometimes be very hazardous especially during the torrential rains in the months of August to October.

The months between September and March are relatively cool, January being the coolest with a temperature averaging at 18°C.

Climate data for Siddavatam
Month	Jan	Feb	Mar	Apr	May	Jun	Jul	Aug	Sep	Oct	Nov	Dec	Year
Mean daily maximum °C (°F)	22 (72)	28 (82)	35 (95)	40 (104)	45 (113)	40 (104)	36 (97)	35 (95)	35 (95)	35 (95)	28 (82)	22 (72)	33 (92)
Mean daily minimum °C (°F)	15 (59)	19 (66)	22 (72)	27 (81)	32 (90)	29 (84)	28 (82)	27 (81)	27 (81)	27 (81)	22 (72)	17 (63)	24 (76)
Source: Indian Meteorological Department

== Other attractions ==
The fort built here attracts many tourists. This popular fort was taken under control by Archaeological Survey of India in 1956. Not only fort, this place is also famous for many temples. Among these are Ranganatha Swamy temple, Jyoti Siddavateswara Swamy temple, Panchalingala and others. There is also a 16 pillar Mantapam built in the name of Bhakara Panthulu, who also lends his name to the nearby hamlet of Bhakarapeta. Bhakara Pantulu seems to be the corrupted form for Bhaskara Pantulu.
