= Golconda =

11th-century citadel in Telangana, India

- Hyderabad, India
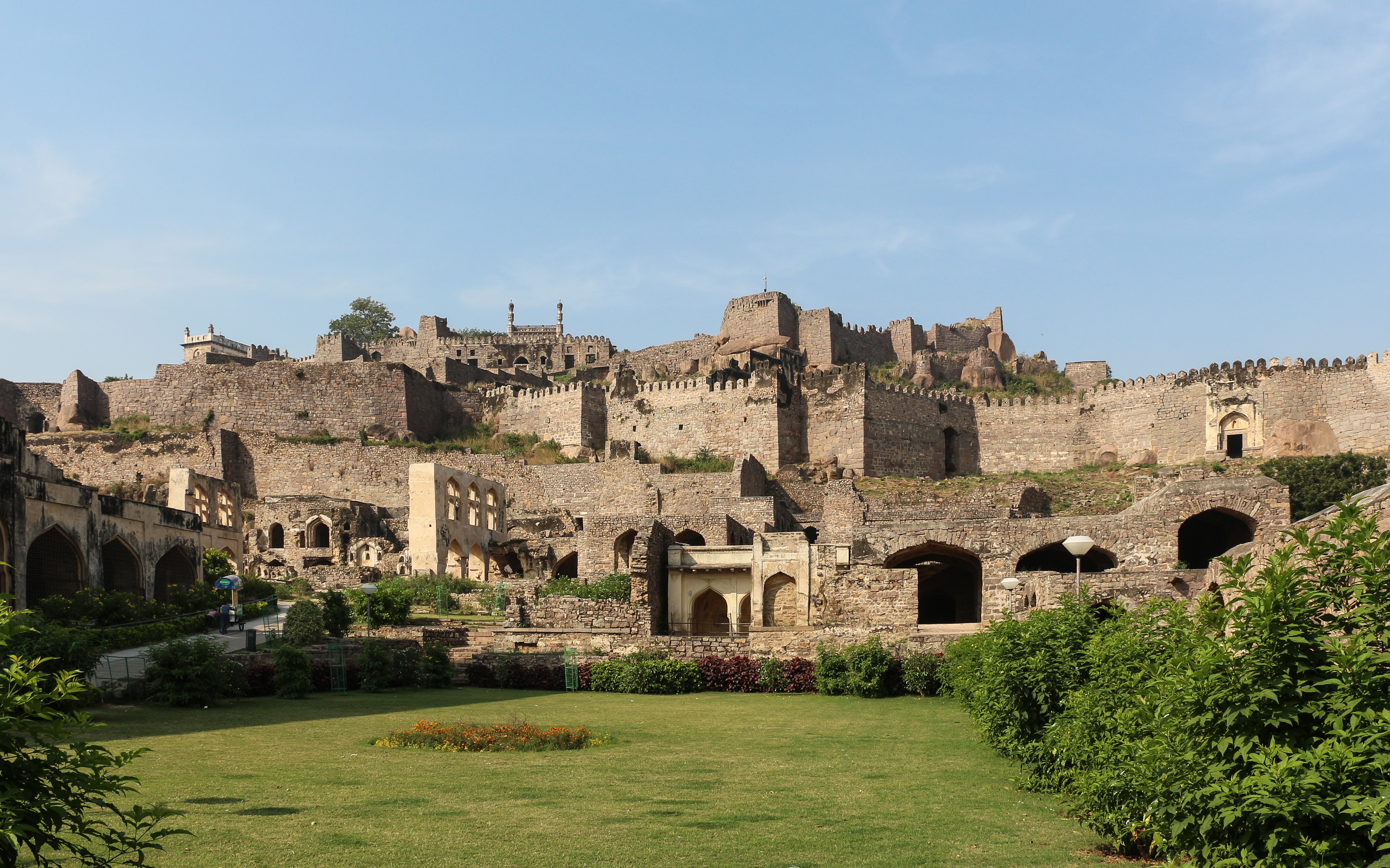

Site information
- Type: Fort
- Owner: Archaeological Survey of India
- Controlled by: Archaeological Survey of India
- Open to the public: Yes

Location
- Location within Hyderabad
- Coordinates: 17°22′59″N 78°24′04″E

Site history
- Built: 11th century
- Built by: Kakatiya dynasty ruler King Prataparudra in the 11th century, 1143 CE (mud fort); Sultan Quli Qutb-ul-Mulk (1518 present stone fortification)

Garrison information
- Occupants: Bahmani Sultanate, Golconda Sultanate, Mughal Empire, Hyderabad State

Golconda (IPA: [ɡoːlkoɳɖɐ]) or Muhammadnagar is a fortified citadel and ruined city located on the western outskirts of Hyderabad, Telangana, India. The fort was initially built by Kakatiya ruler Pratāparudra in the 11th century out of mud walls, and was expanded into the current stone citadel by the Qutb Shahs. It was ceded to the Bahmani Kings (before it fragmented into 5 other kingdoms known as the "Deccan Sultanates") from Musunuri Nayakas during the reign of Bahmani Sultan Mohammed Shah I, during the first Bahmani–Vijayanagara War. Following the death of Sultan Mahmood Shah, the Sultanate disintegrated and Sultan Quli, who had been appointed as the Governor of Hyderabad by the Bahmani Kings, fortified the city and made it the capital of the Sultanate of Golconda. Because of the vicinity of diamond mines, especially Kollur Mine, Golconda flourished as a trade centre of large diamonds known as Golconda diamonds. The complex was put by UNESCO on its "tentative list" to become a World Heritage Site in 2014, with other forts in the region, under the name Monuments and Forts of the Deccan Sultanate (despite there being a number of different sultanates).

== History ==
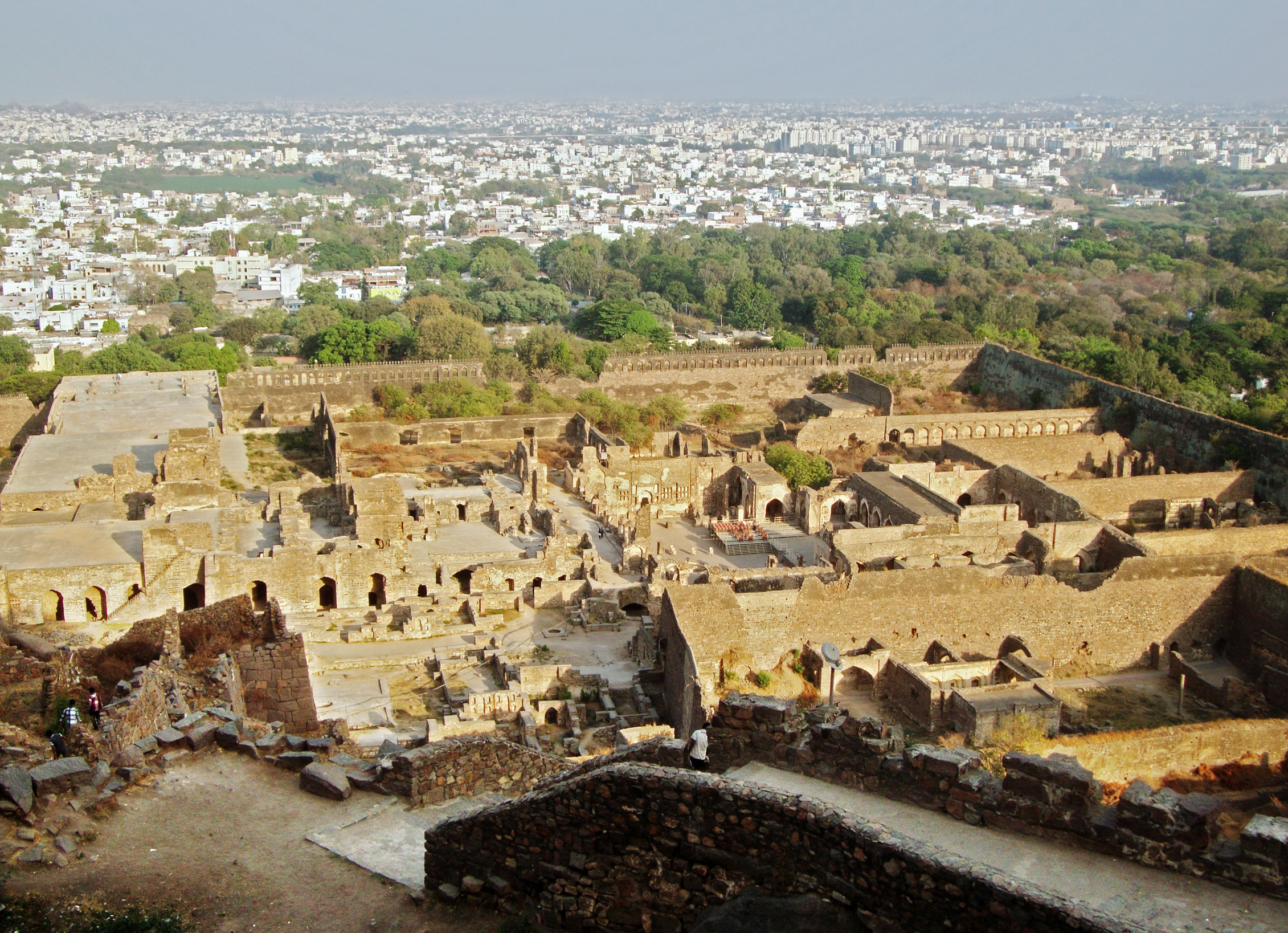
Ruins of the fort

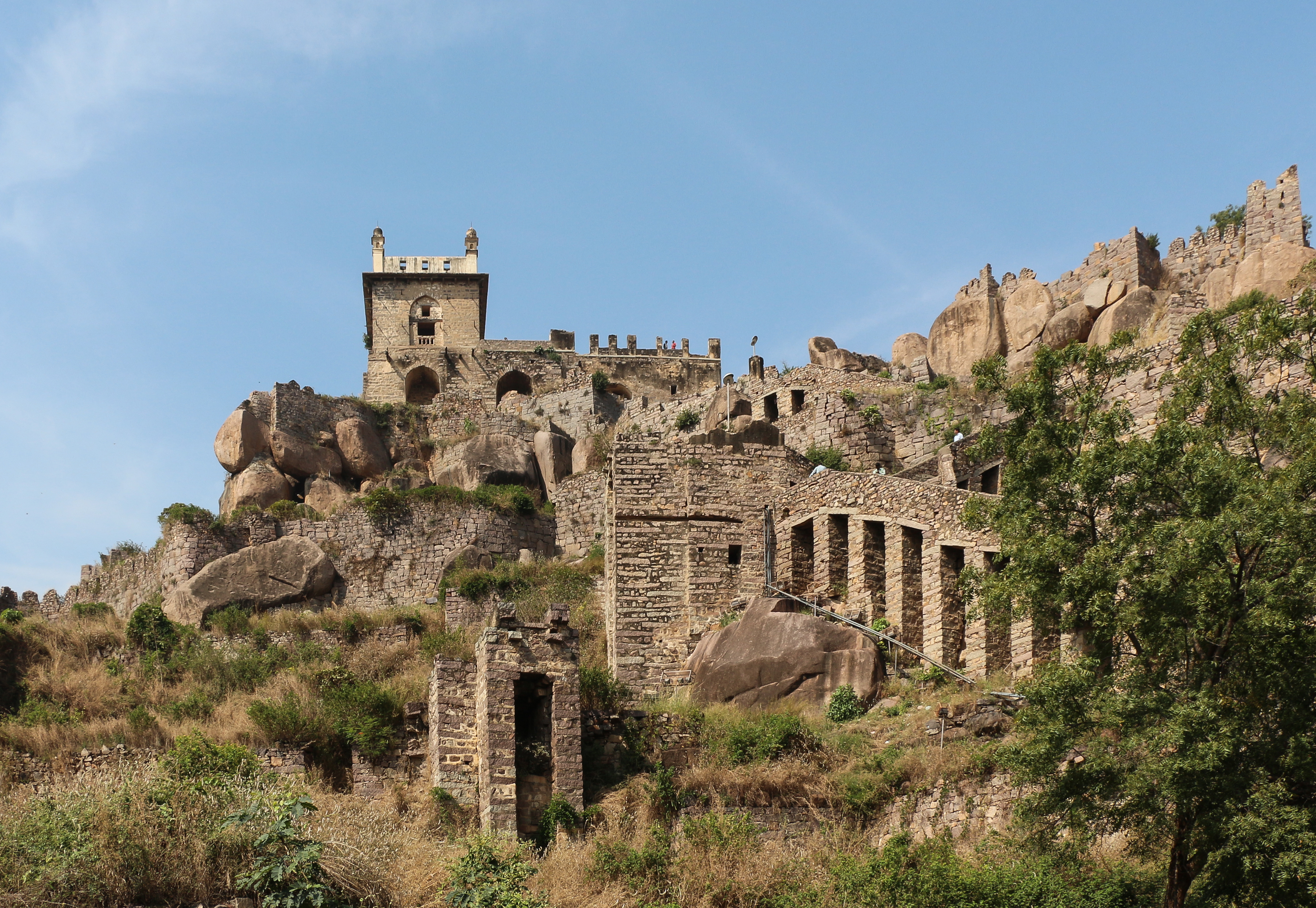
View of the Baradari at the Golconda Fort

The origins of the Golconda fort can be traced back to the 11th century. It was originally a small mud fort built by Pratāparudra of the Kakatiya dynasty. The name Golconda is thought to originate from the Telugu గొల్లకొండ Gollakoṇḍa for "Shepherd's hill". It is also thought that Kakatiya ruler Ganapati 1199–1262 built a stone hilltop outpost—later known as Golconda fort—to defend their western region. The fort was later developed into a fortified citadel in 1518 by Quli Qutb Shah of the Sultanate of Golconda and the city was declared the capital of the Sultanate of Golconda.

The Bahmani Kingdom took possession of the fort after it was made over to them by means of a sanad by the Rajah of Warangal. Under the Bahmani Kingdom, Golconda slowly rose to prominence. Quli Qutb Shah (r. 1487–1543), sent by the Bahmanids as a governor at Golconda, established the city as the seat of his governance around 1501. Bahmani rule gradually weakened during this period, and Sultan Quli (Quli Qutub Shah period) formally became independent in 1518, establishing the Sultanate of Golconda based in Golconda. Over a period of 62 years, the mud fort was expanded by the first three Qutb Shahi sultans into the present structure: a massive fortification of granite extending around 5 km (3.1 mi) in circumference. It remained the capital of the Qutb Shahi dynasty until 1590 when the capital was shifted to Hyderabad. The Qutb Shahis expanded the fort, whose 7 km (4.3 mi) outer wall enclosed the city.

During the early seventeenth century a strong cotton-weaving industry existed in Golconda. Large quantities of cotton were produced for domestic and exports consumption. High quality plain or patterned cloth made of muslin and calico was produced. Plain cloth was available as white or brown colour, in bleached or dyed variety. Exports of this cloth was to Persia and European countries. Patterned cloth was made of prints which were made indigenously with indigo for blue, chay-root for red coloured prints and vegetable yellow. Patterned cloth exports were mainly to Java, Sumatra and other eastern countries. The fort finally fell into ruin in 1687 after an eight-month-long siege led to its fall at the hands of the Mughal emperor Aurangzeb, who ended the Qutb Shahi reign and took the last Golconda king, Abul Hasan Qutb Shah, captive.

== Diamonds ==
The Golconda fort used to have a vault where the famous Koh-i-Noor and Hope diamonds were once stored along with other diamonds.

Diamonds believed to have been excavated from the mines of Golconda include:

- Daria-i-Noor
- Noor-ol-Ain
- Koh-i-Noor
- Hope Diamond
- Princie Diamond
- Regent Diamond
- Wittelsbach-Graff Diamond

During the Renaissance and early modern eras, the name "Golconda" acquired a legendary aura and became synonymous for vast wealth. The mines brought riches to the Qutb Shahis of Hyderabad State, who ruled Golconda up to 1687, then to the Nizam of Hyderabad, who ruled after the independence from the Mughal Empire in 1724 until 1948, when the Indian annexation of Hyderabad occurred. The siege of Golconda occurred in January 1687, when Mughal Emperor Aurangzeb led his forces to besiege the Qutb Shahi dynasty at Golconda fort (also known as the Diamond Capitol of its time) and was home to the Kollur Mine. The ruler of Golconda was the well entrenched Abul Hasan Qutb Shah.

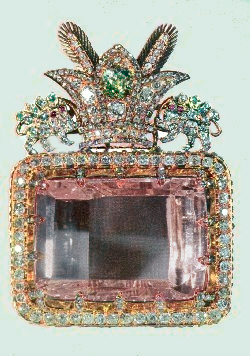
Daria-i-Noor

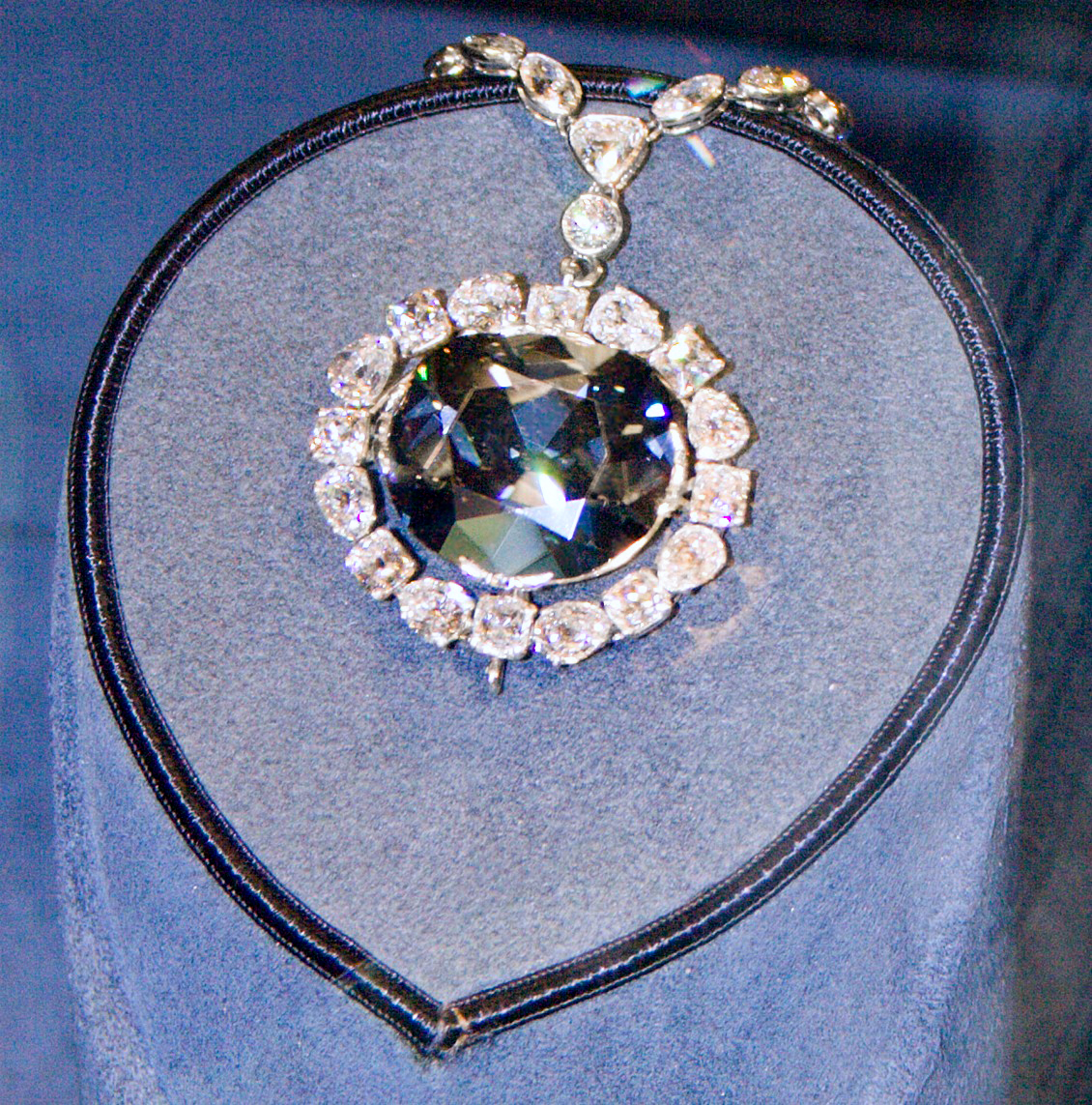
Hope Diamond

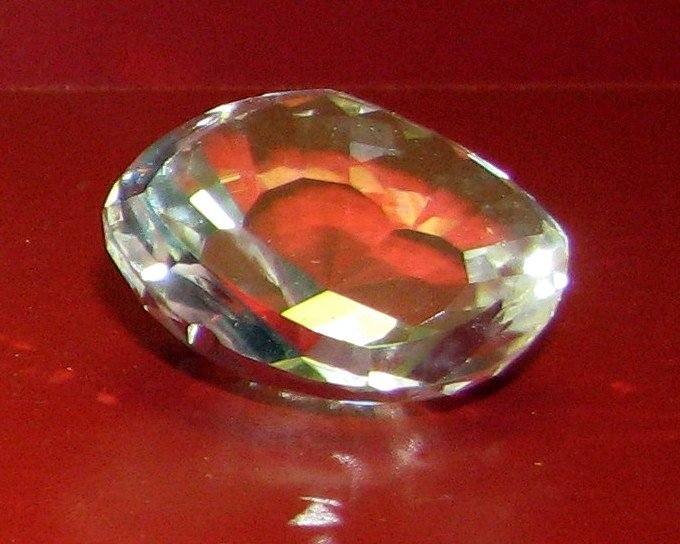
Koh-i-Noor

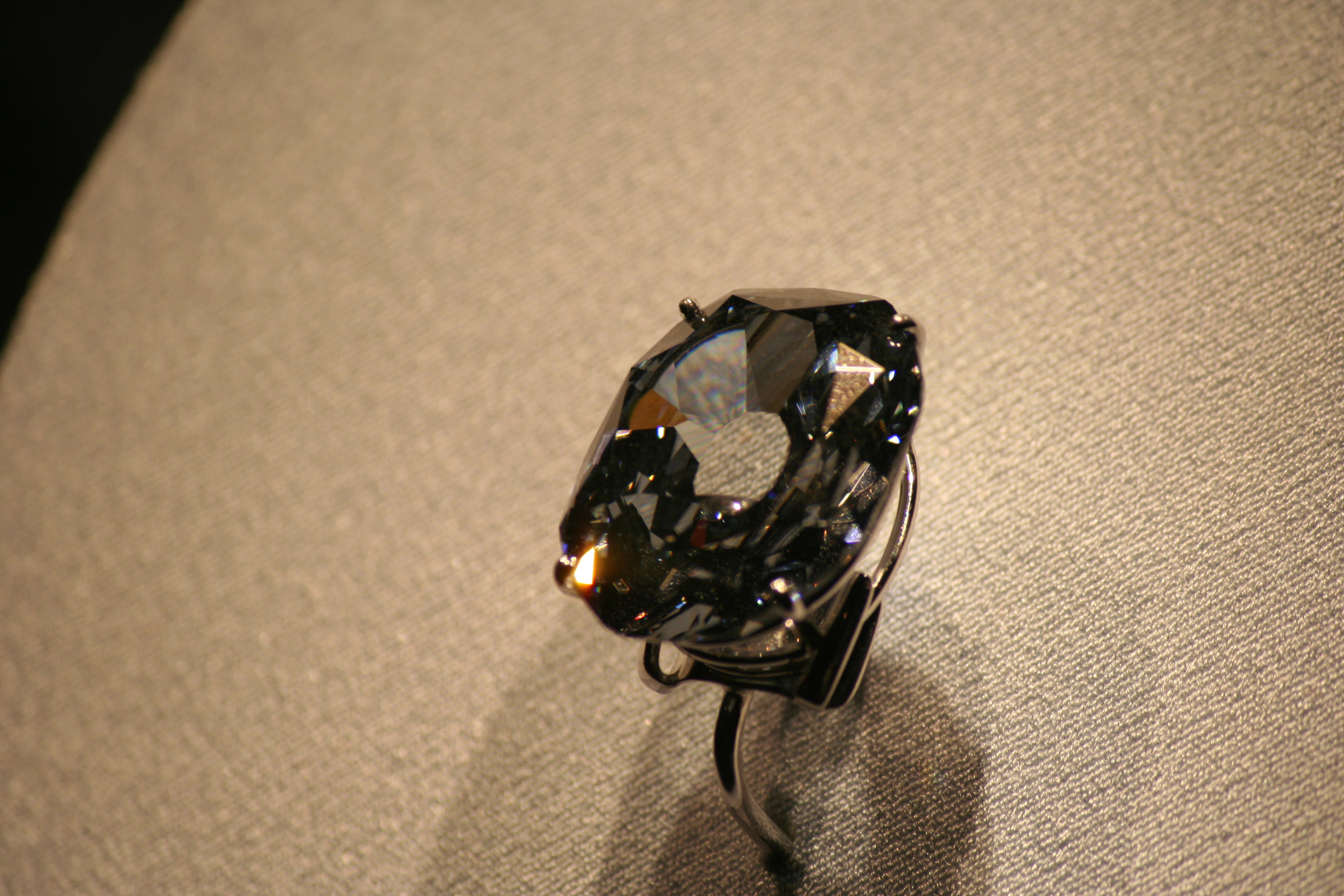
Wittelsbach-Graff Diamond

== Architecture ==
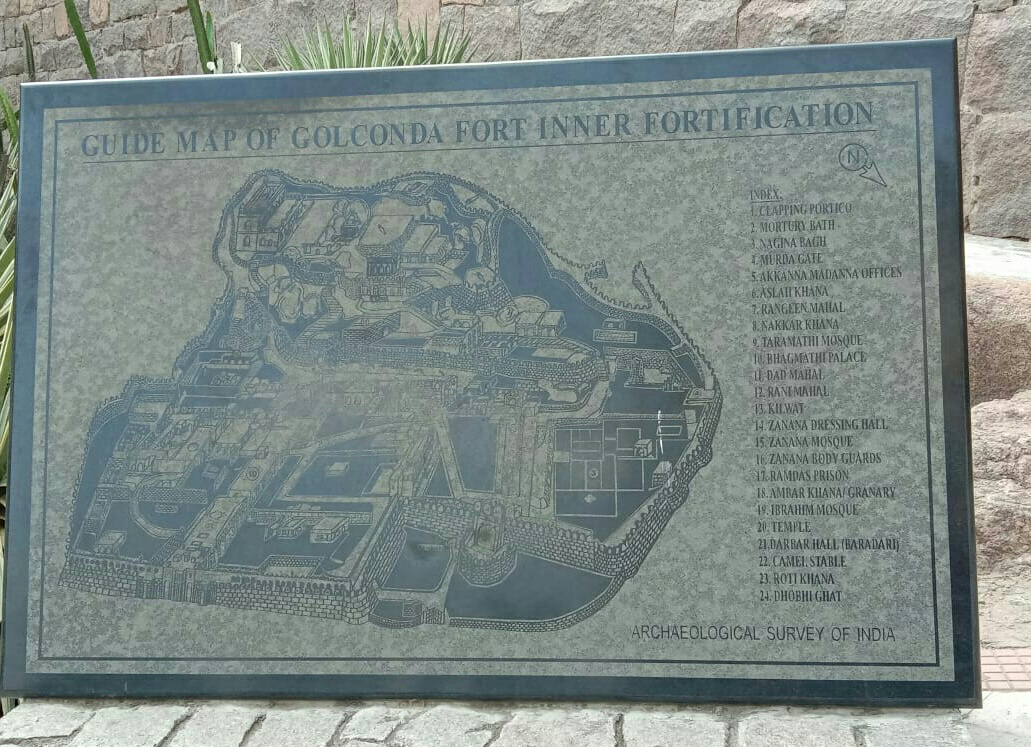
Guide map of Golconda fort

Golconda fort is listed as an archaeological treasure on the official "List of Monuments" prepared by the Archaeological Survey of India under The Ancient Monuments and Archaeological Sites and Remains Act. Golconda consists of four distinct forts with a 10 km (6.2 mi) long outer wall with 87 semicircular bastions (some still mounted with cannons), eight gateways, and four drawbridges, with a number of royal apartments and halls, temples, mosques, magazines, stables, etc. inside. The lowest of these is the outermost enclosure entered by the "Fateh Darwaza" (Victory gate, so called after Aurangzeb’s triumphant army marched in through this gate) studded with giant iron spikes (to prevent elephants from battering them down) near the south-eastern corner. An acoustic effect can be experienced at Fateh Darwazaan, a hand clap at a certain point below the dome at the entrance reverberates and can be heard clearly at the "Bala Hisar" pavilion, the highest point almost a kilometer away. This worked as a warning in case of an attack.

The "Bala Hisar" gate is the main entrance to the fort located on the eastern side. It has a pointed arch bordered by rows of scroll work. The spandrels have yalis and decorated roundels. The area above the door has peacocks with ornate tails flanking an ornamental arched niche. The granite block lintel below has sculpted yalis flanking a disc. The design of peacocks and lions is typical of Hindu architecture and underlies this fort's Hindu origins.

The Jagdamba temple, located next to the mosque of Ibrahim and the king's palace, is visited by hundreds of thousands of Hindu devotees during Bonalu festival every year. Jagadamba temple is about 900 to 1,000 years old, dating back to early Kakatiya dynasty. A Mahakali temple is located in the vicinity, within Golconda fort.

The fort also contains the Qutb Shahi tombs. These tombs display features of Indo-Islamic architecture and are located about 1 km (0.62 mi) north of the outer wall of Golconda. They are encircled by gardens and numerous carved stones.

The two individual pavilions on the outer side of Golconda are built on a point which is quite rocky. The "Kala Mandir" is also located in the fort. It can be seen from the king's durbar (king's court) which was on top of the Golconda fort.

The other buildings found inside the fort are: Habshi Kamans (Abyssian arches), Ashlah Khana, Taramati mosque, Ramadas Bandikhana, Camel stable, private chambers (kilwat), Mortuary bath, Nagina bagh, Ramasasa's kotha, Durbar hall, Ambar khana etc.

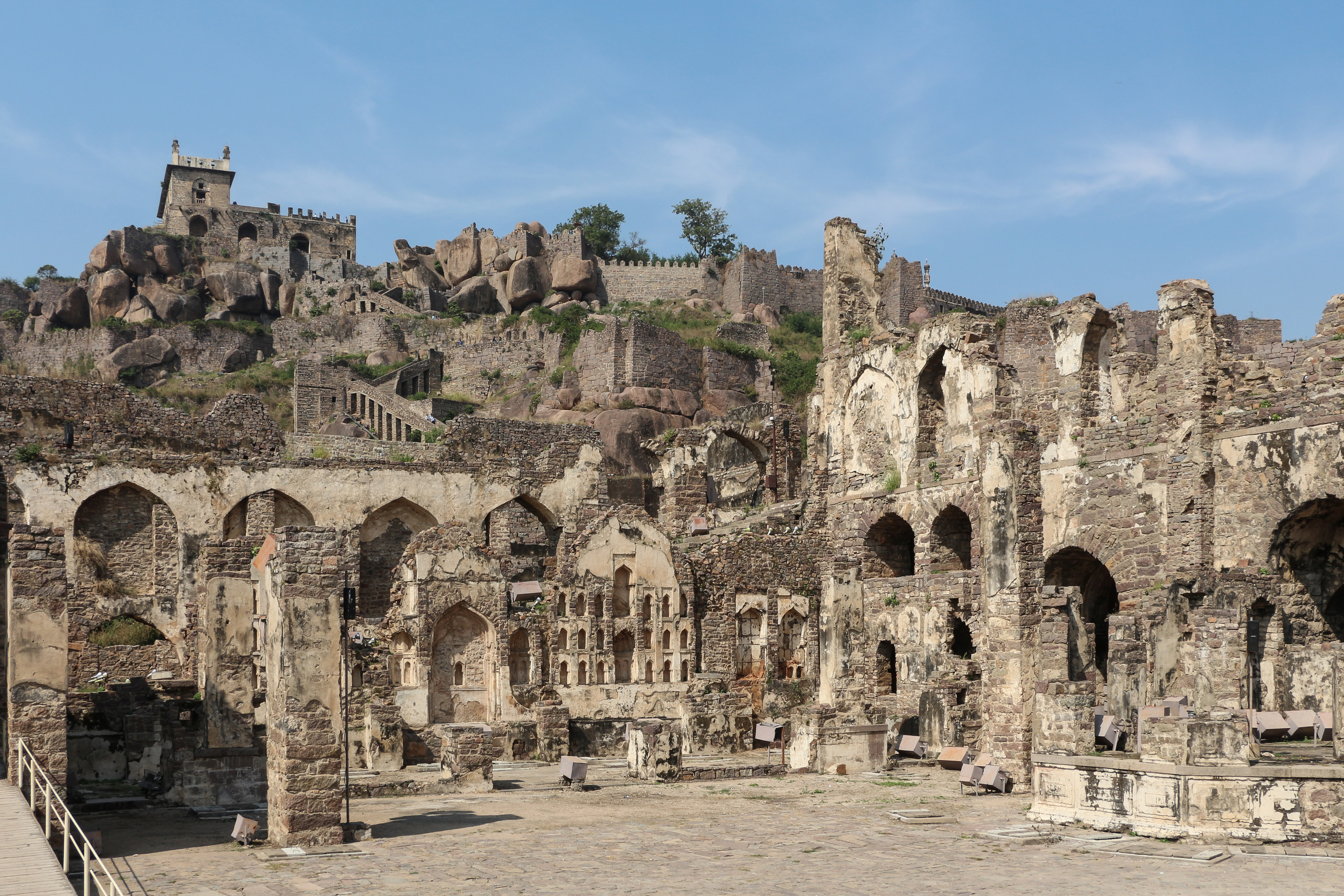
Rani Mahal

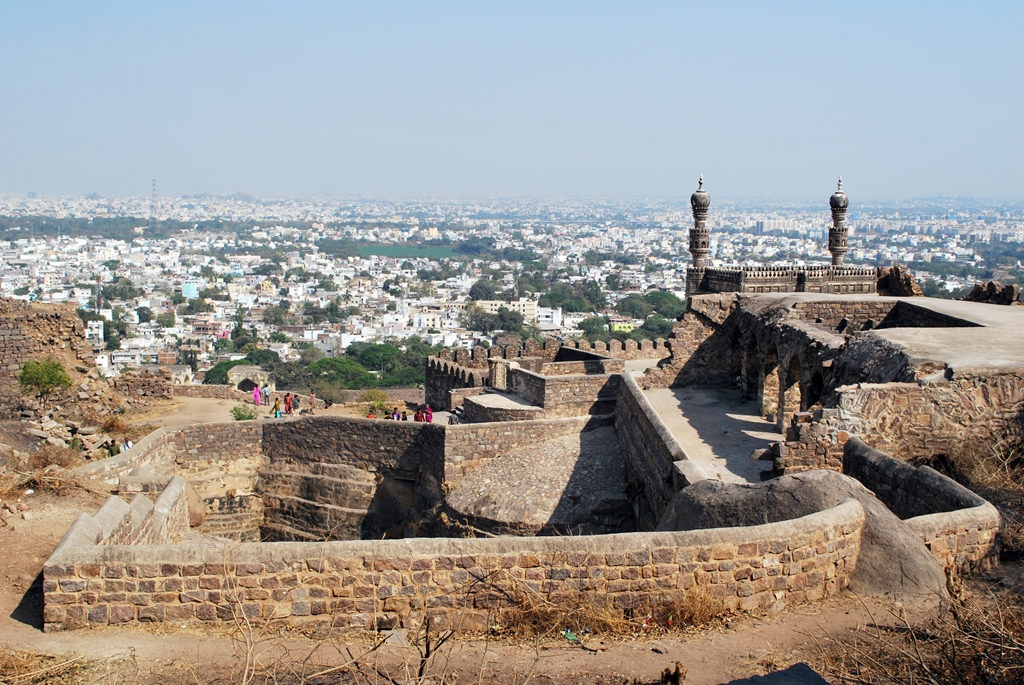
Fort overlooking Hyderabad

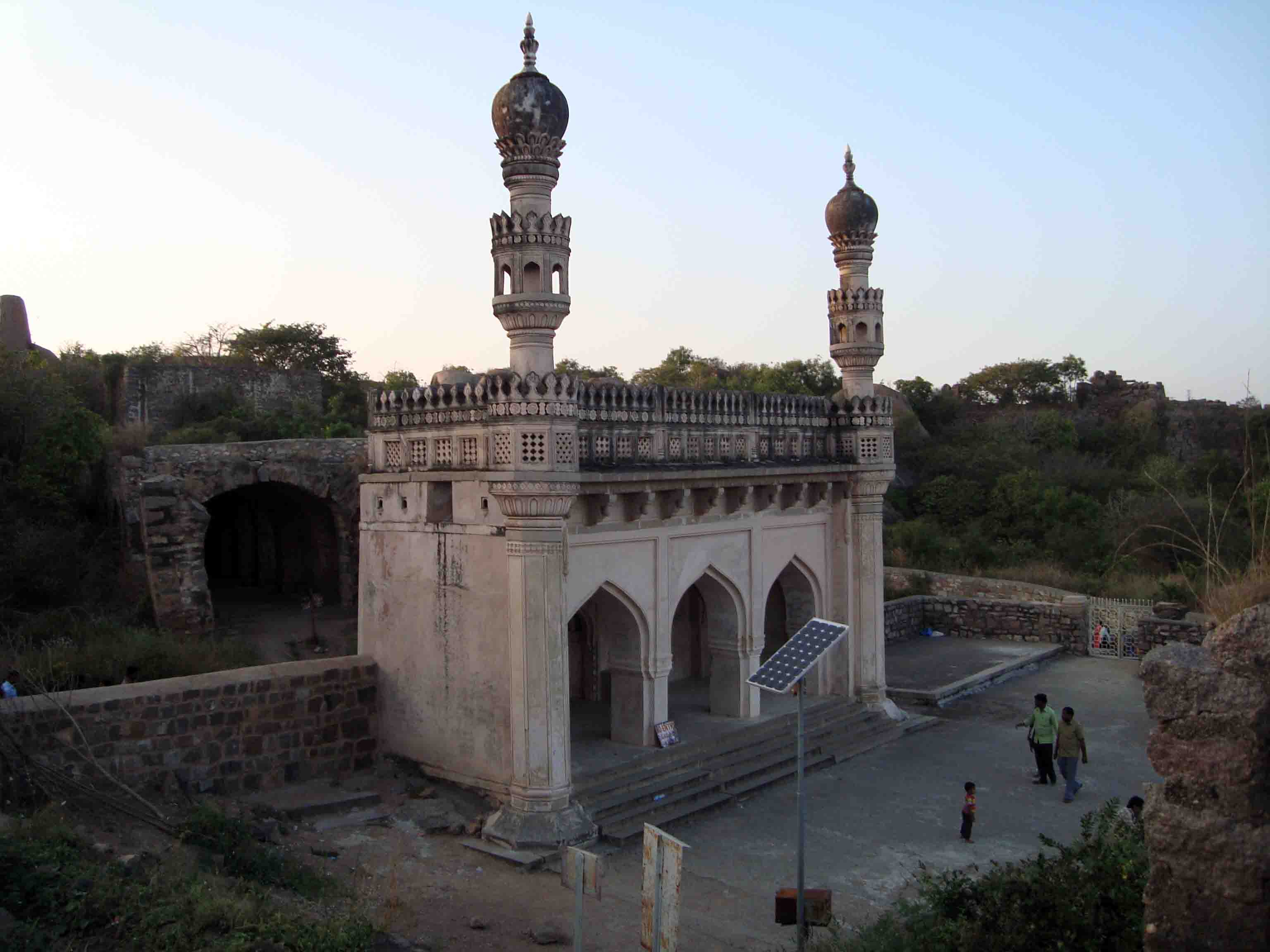
Mosque of Ibrahim at Golconda, Hyderabad

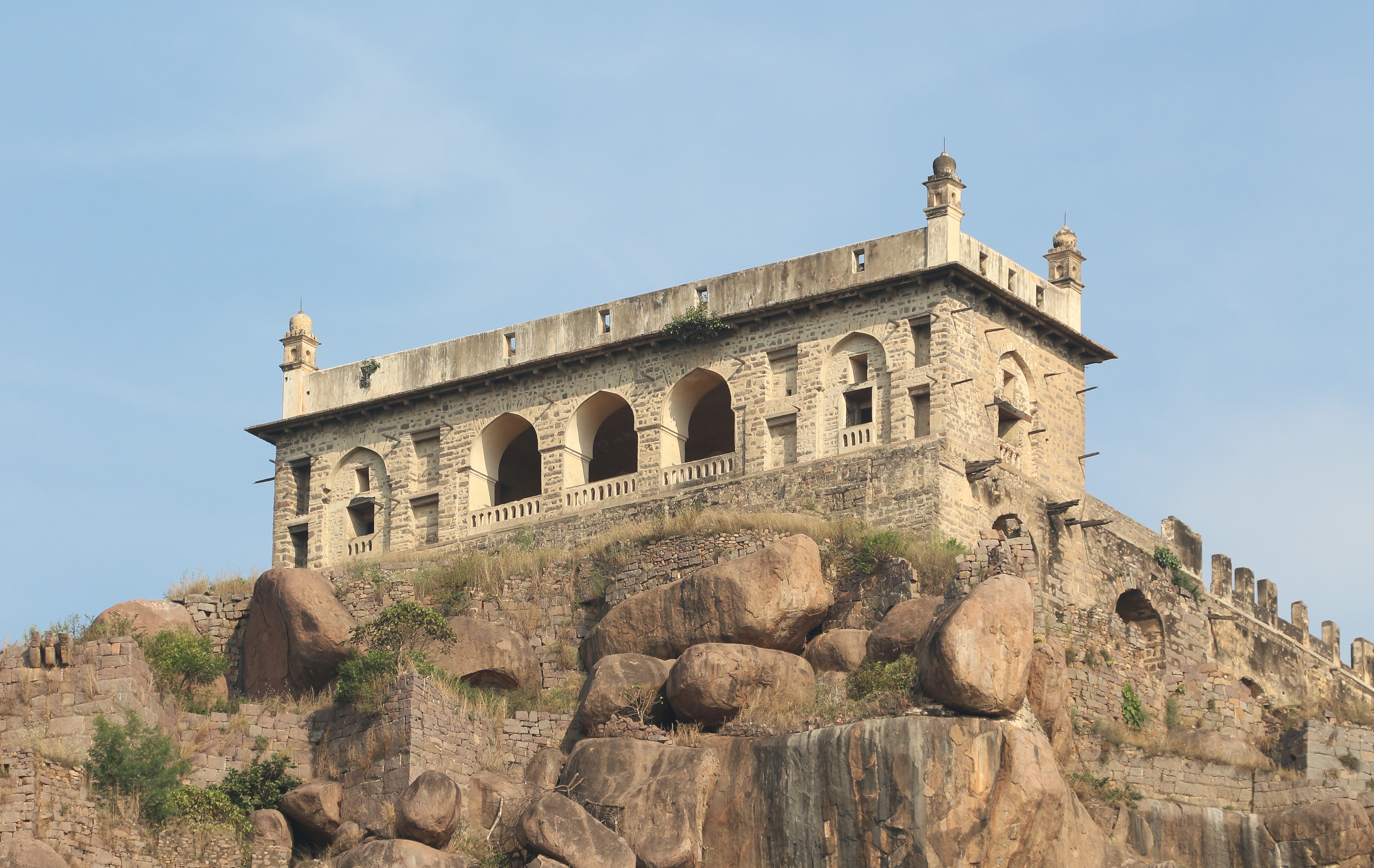
Baradari located at the top of the citadel

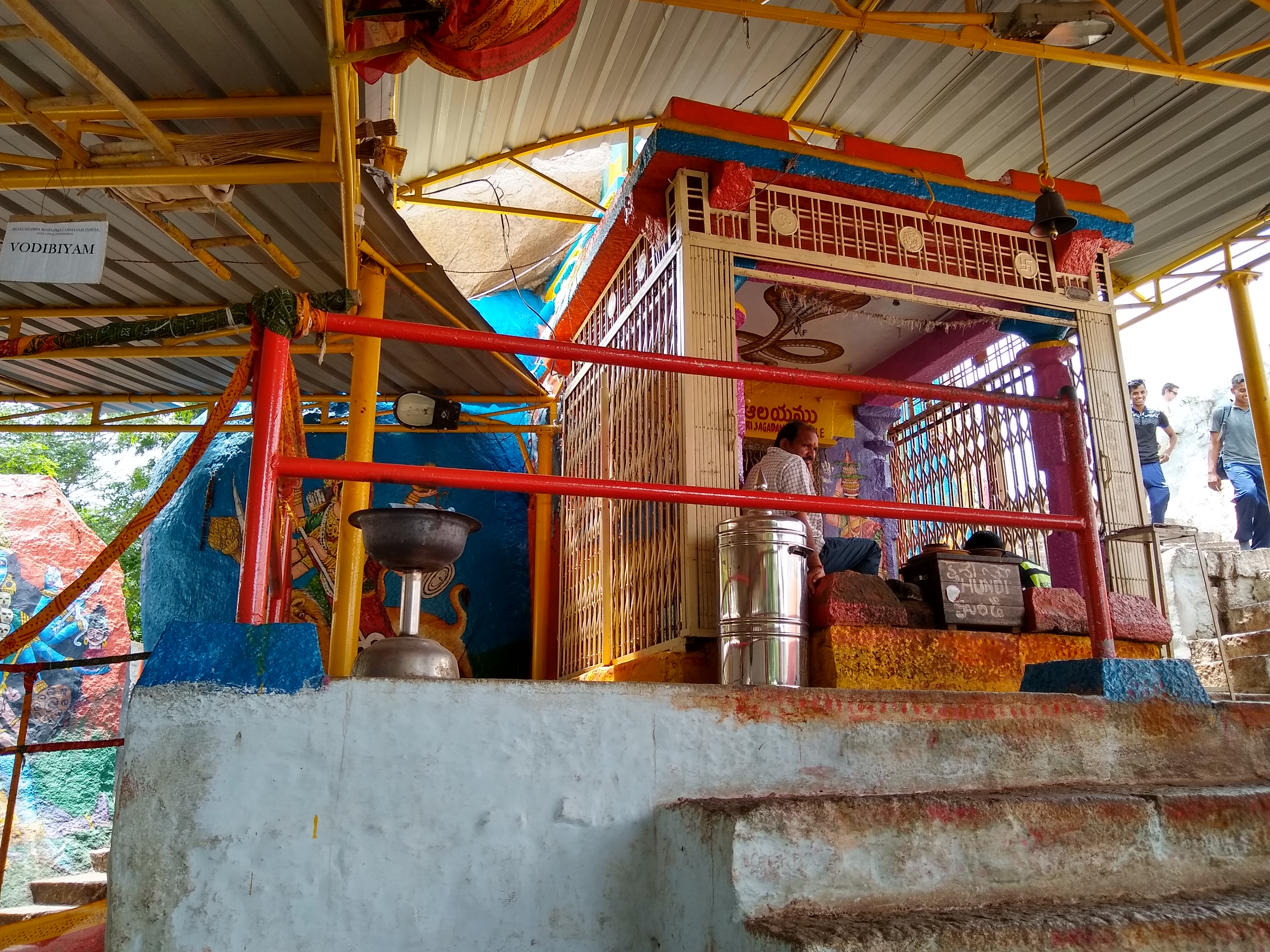
Jagdamba temple at the top of the Golconda fortifications

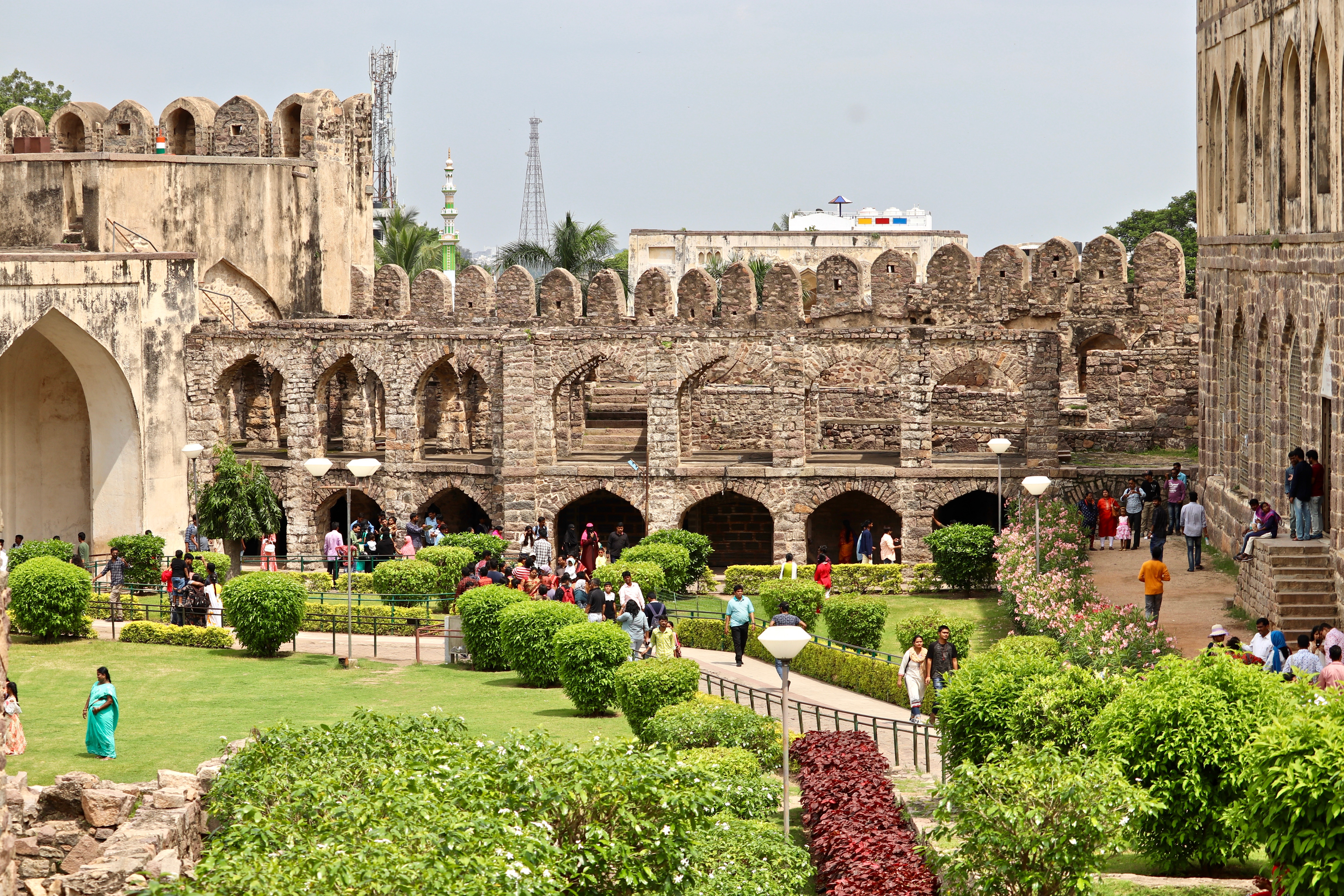
Bala Hissar Darwaza

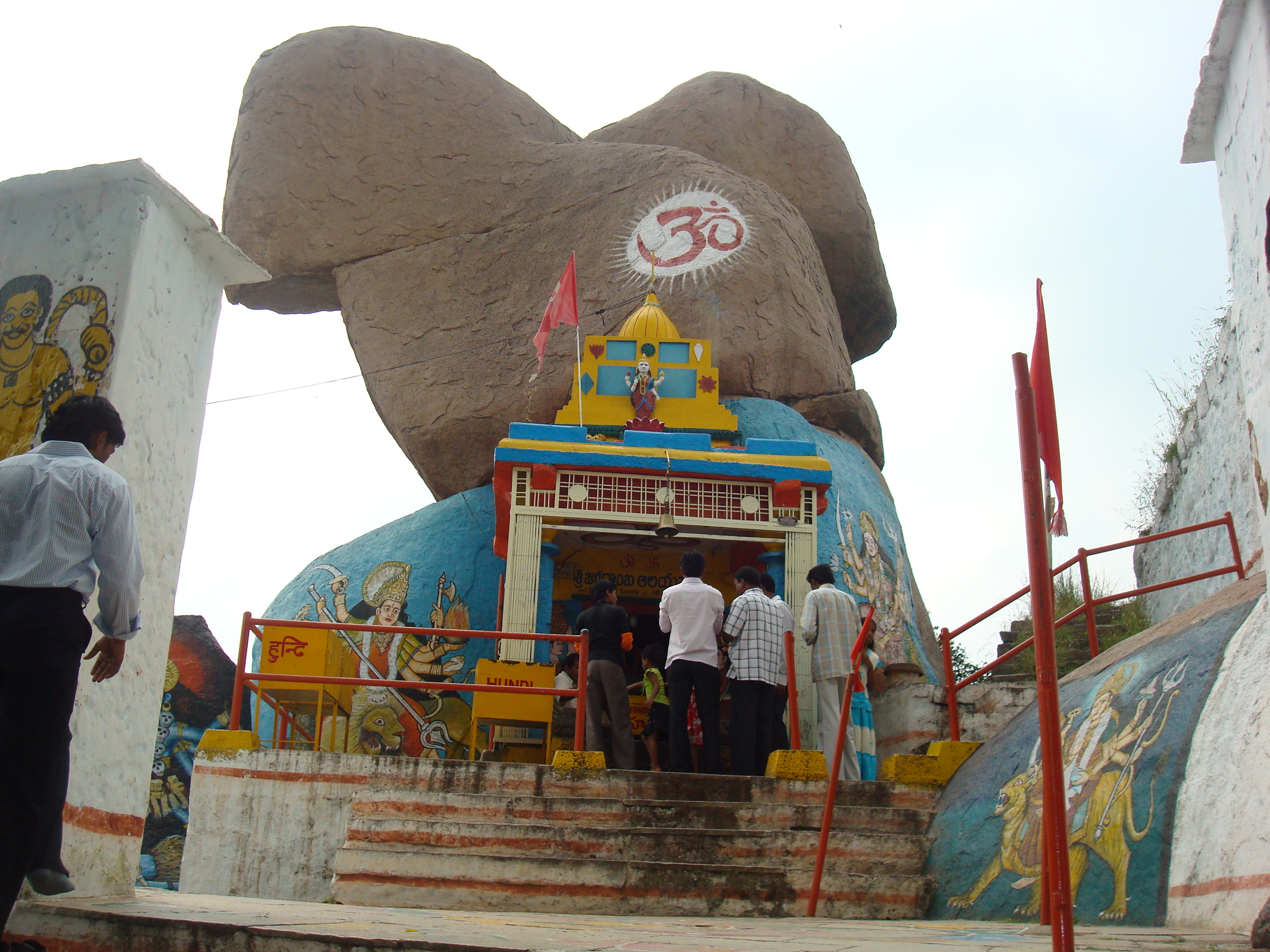
Mahankali temple at Golconda, Hyderabad

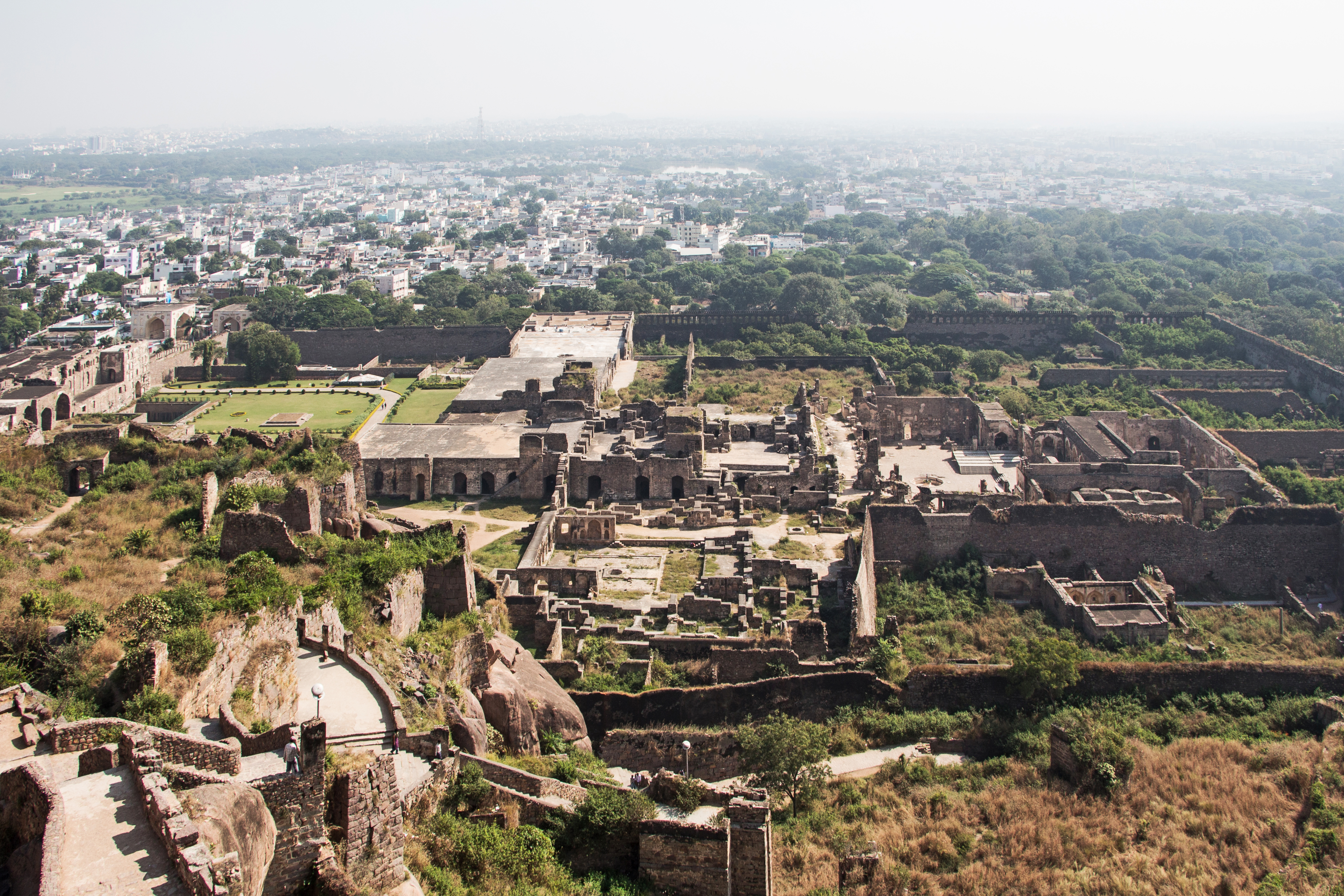
View from the Baradari

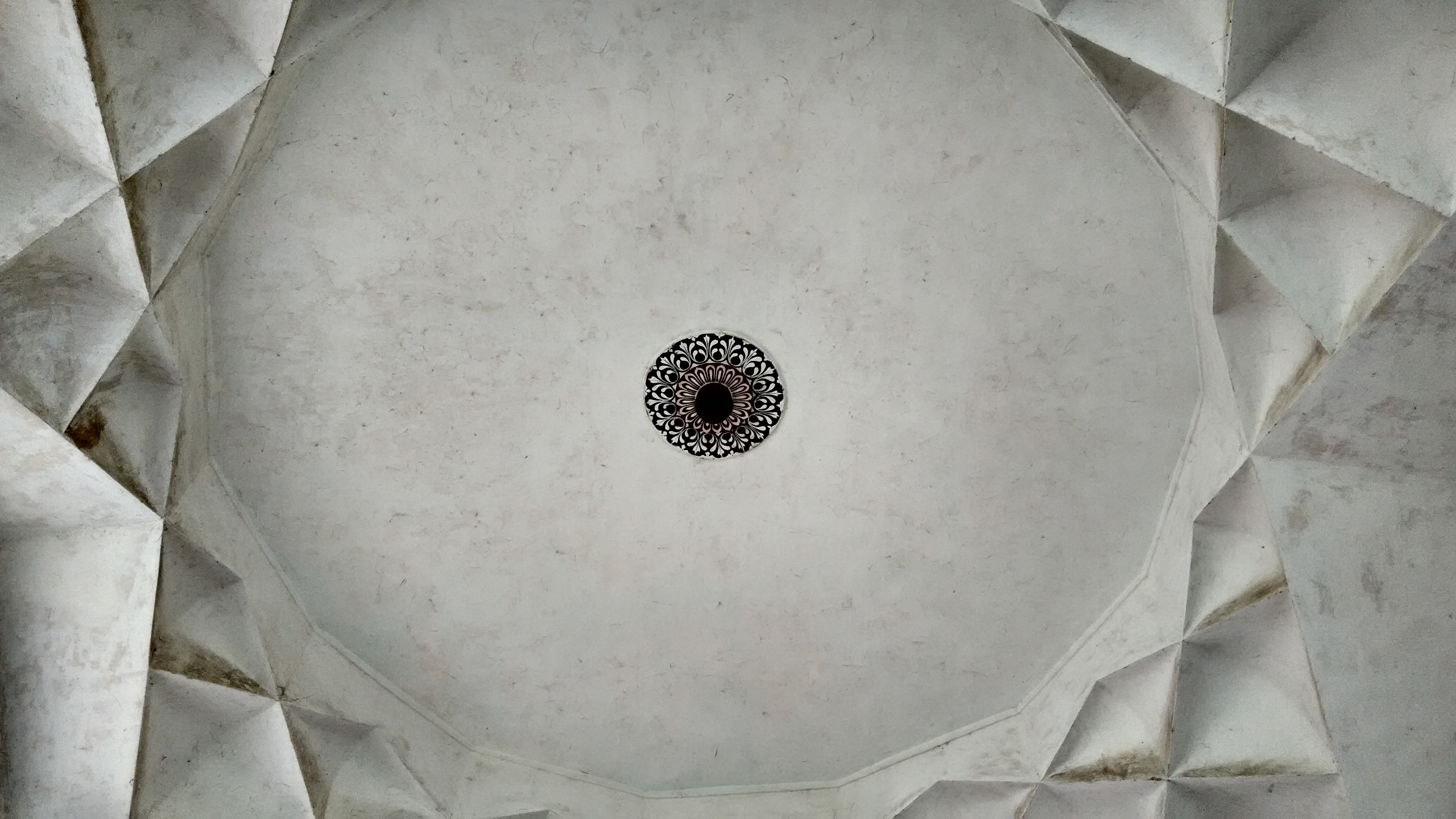
Design inside the Golconda fort

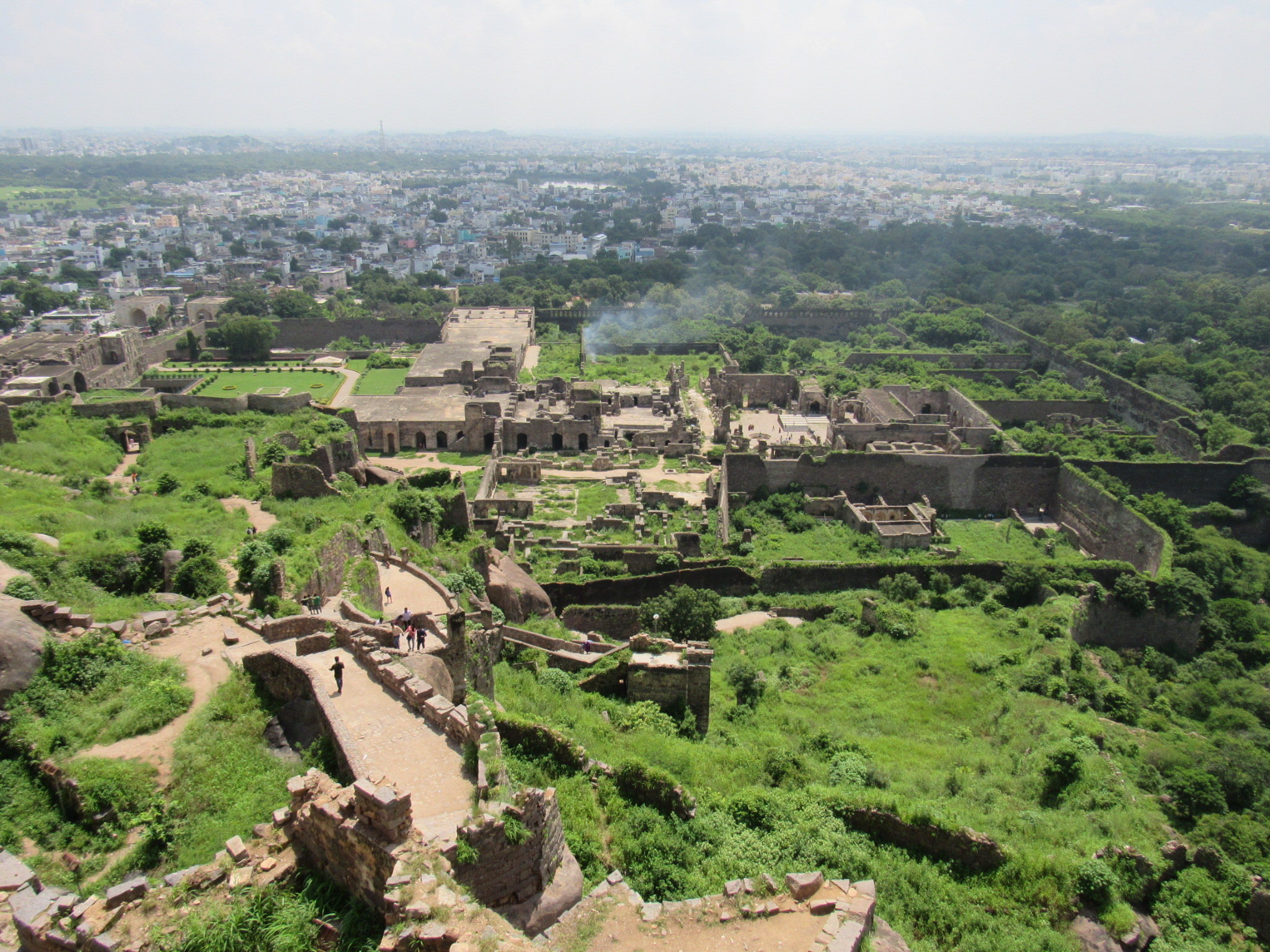
Aerial view of Golconda fort

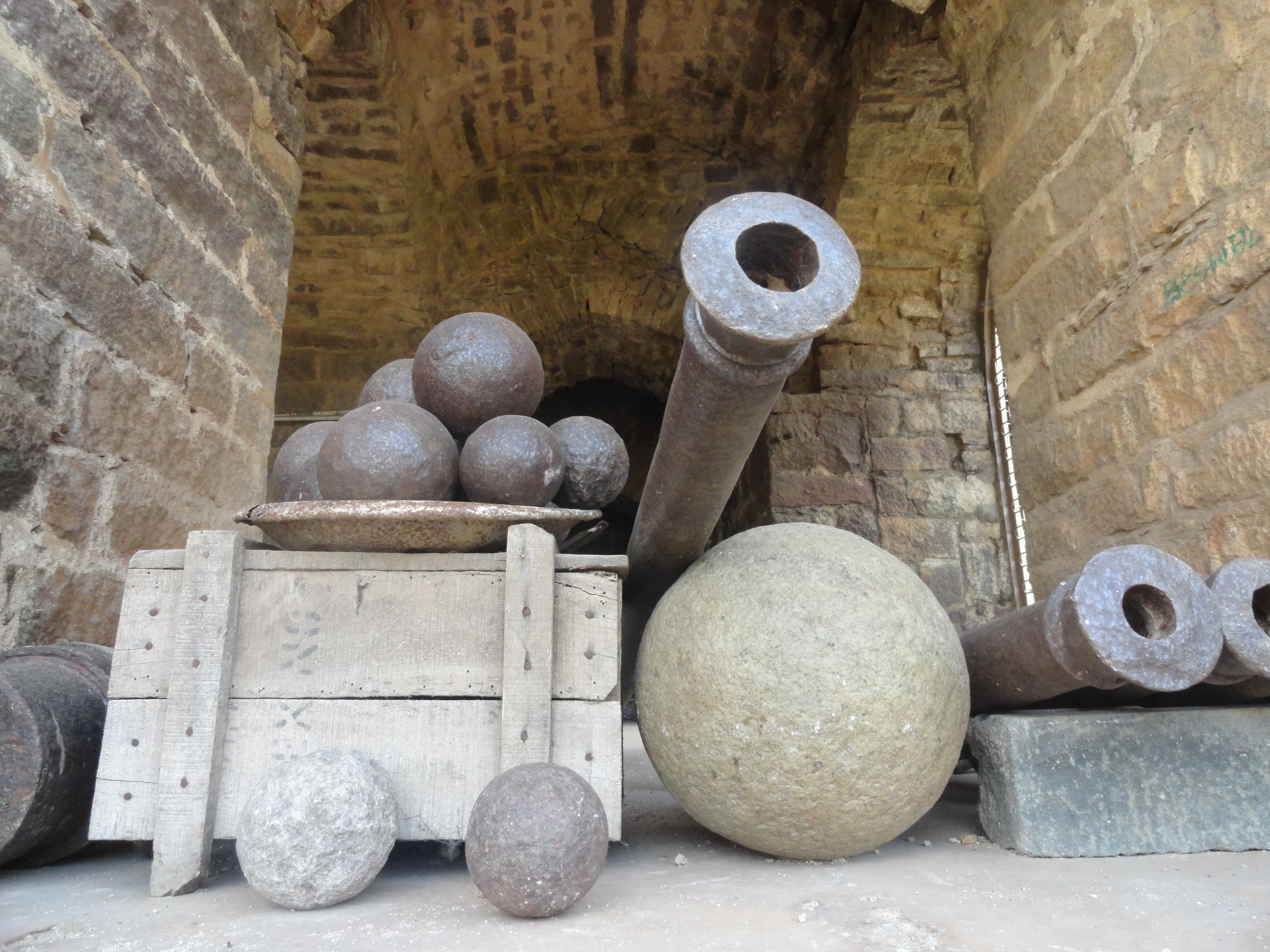
Cannon of the Golconda fort

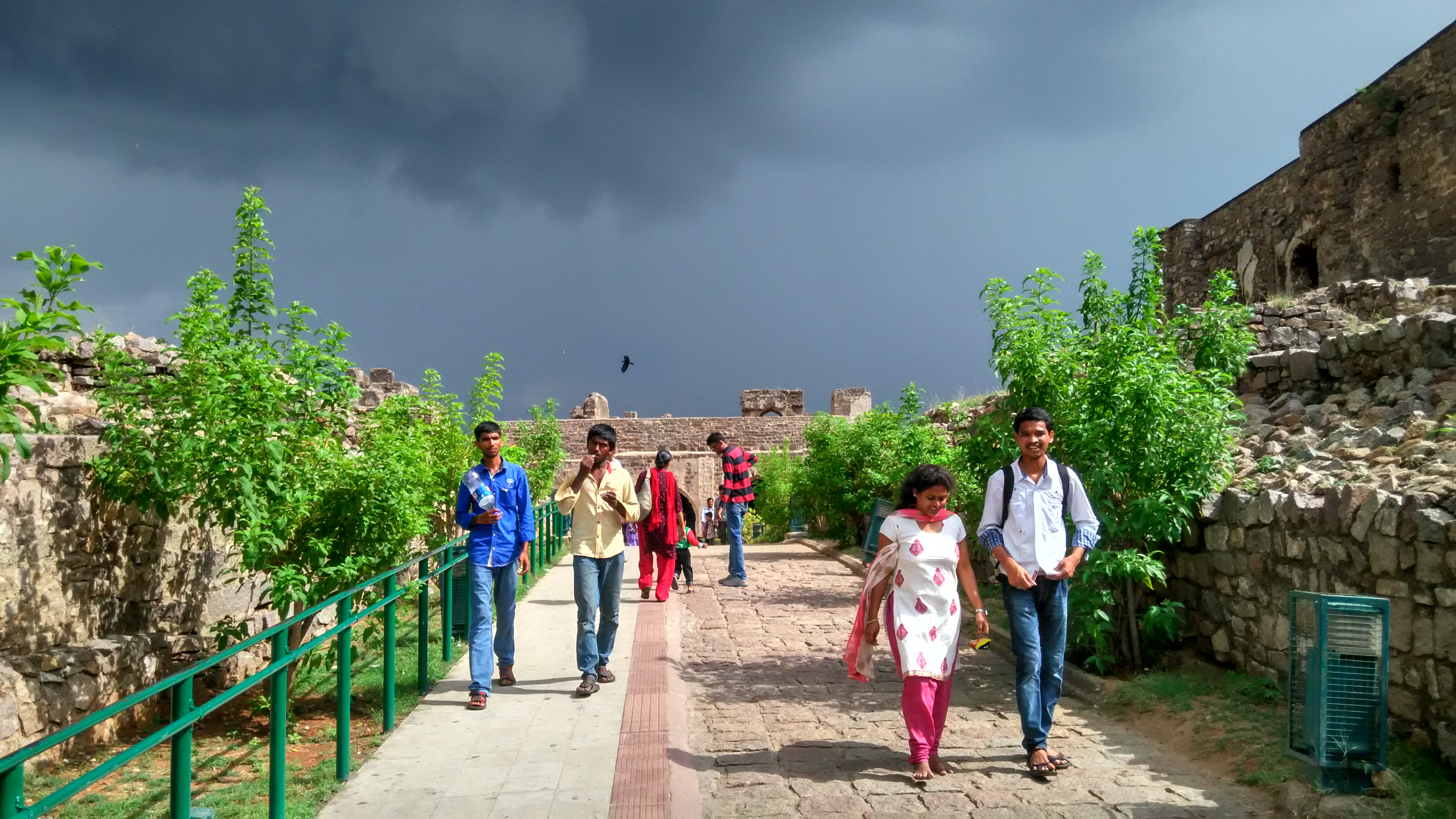
Pathway in Golconda fort

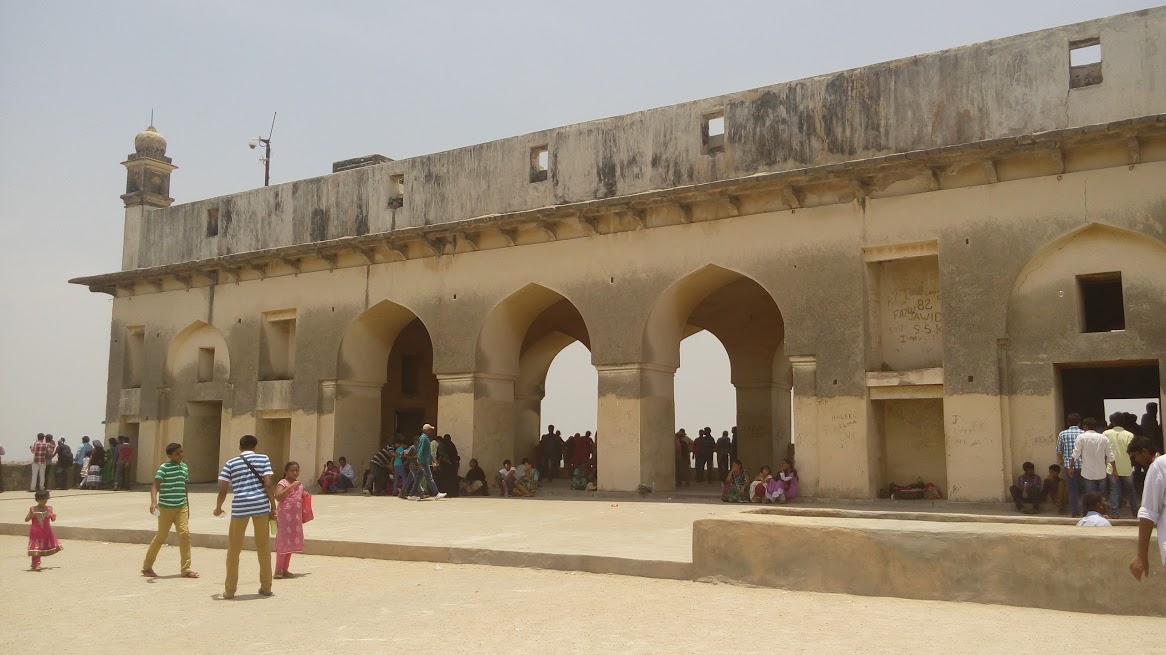
Baradari fort

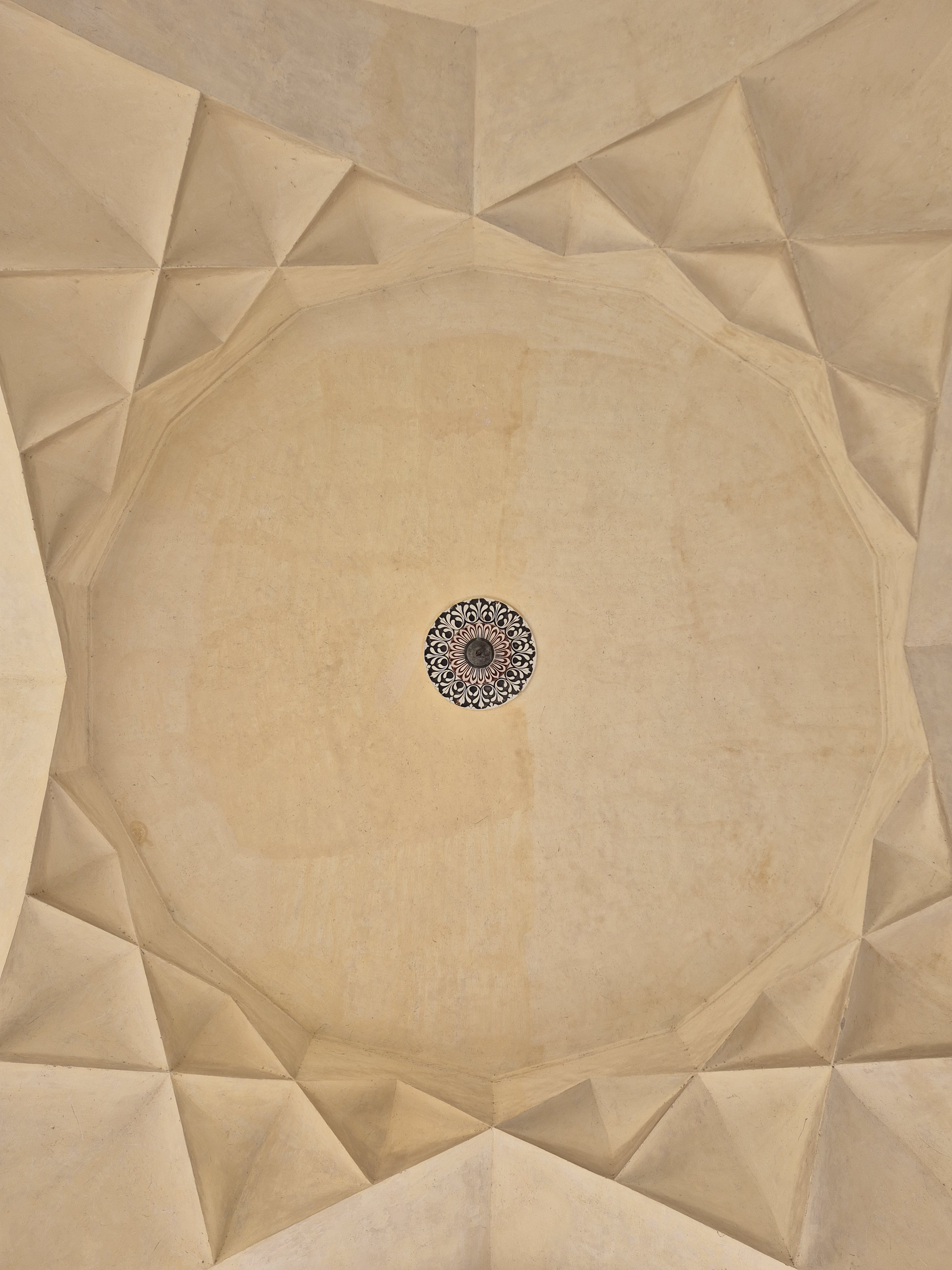
Echo Dome interior

== Golconda ruling dynasties ==
- Asaf Jahi dynasty
- List of Bahmani Sultans
- Kakatiya dynasty
- Mughal Empire
- Musunuri Nayakas
- Sultanate of Golconda

== Qutub Shahi tombs ==
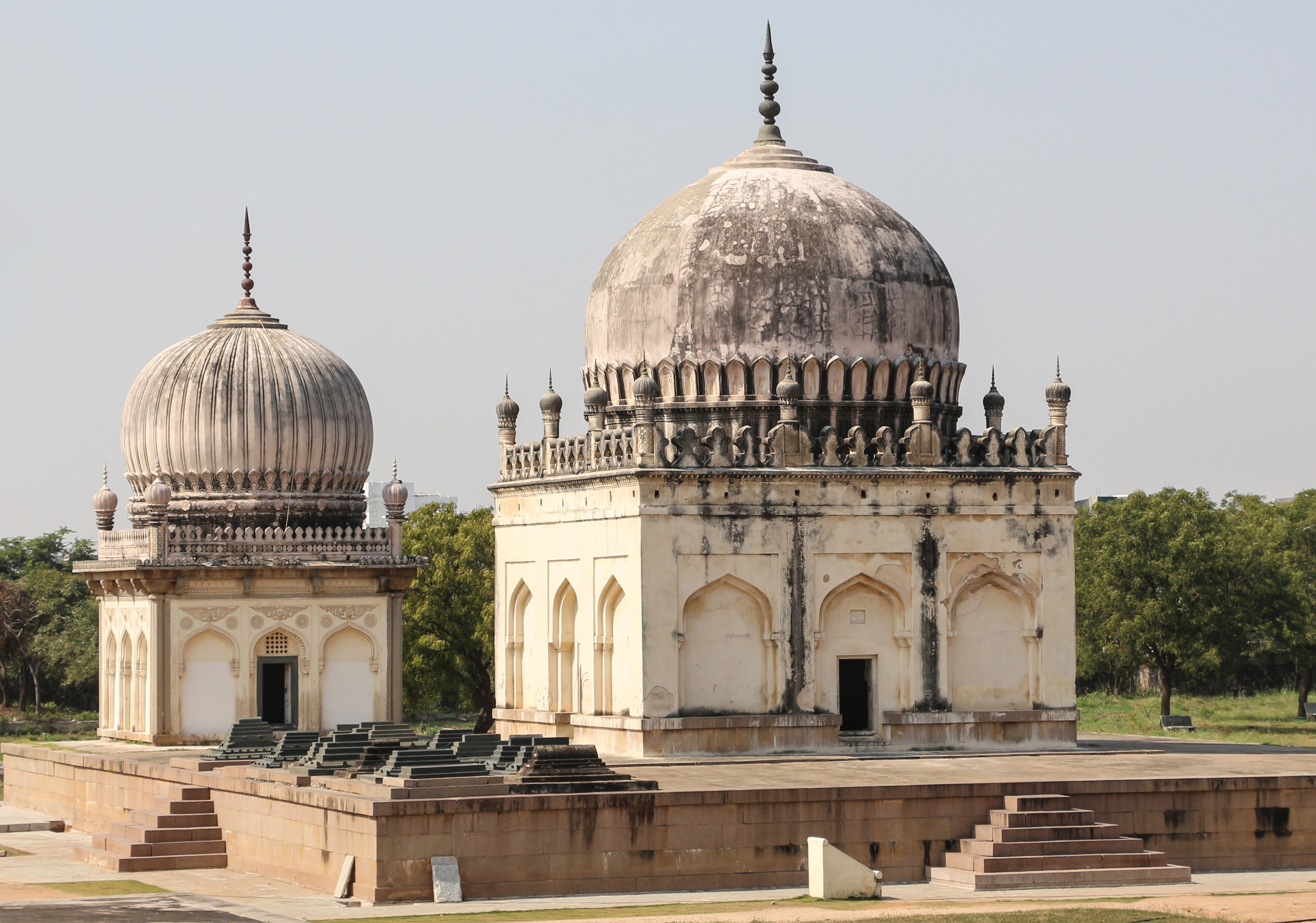
Tombs of Sultan Quli Qutb Shah and Subhan Quli Qutb Shah

== Golconda ropeway ==
Golconda Fort Ropeway, a 1.5-kilometre-long (0.93 mi) ropeway project between hilltop Golconda Fort and 7 Qutb Shahi tombs was approved in September 2025 under Parvatmala, tenders were invited for feasibility study were invited, following which DPR will be prepared for the construction.

== Golconda Artillery Centre, Indian Army ==
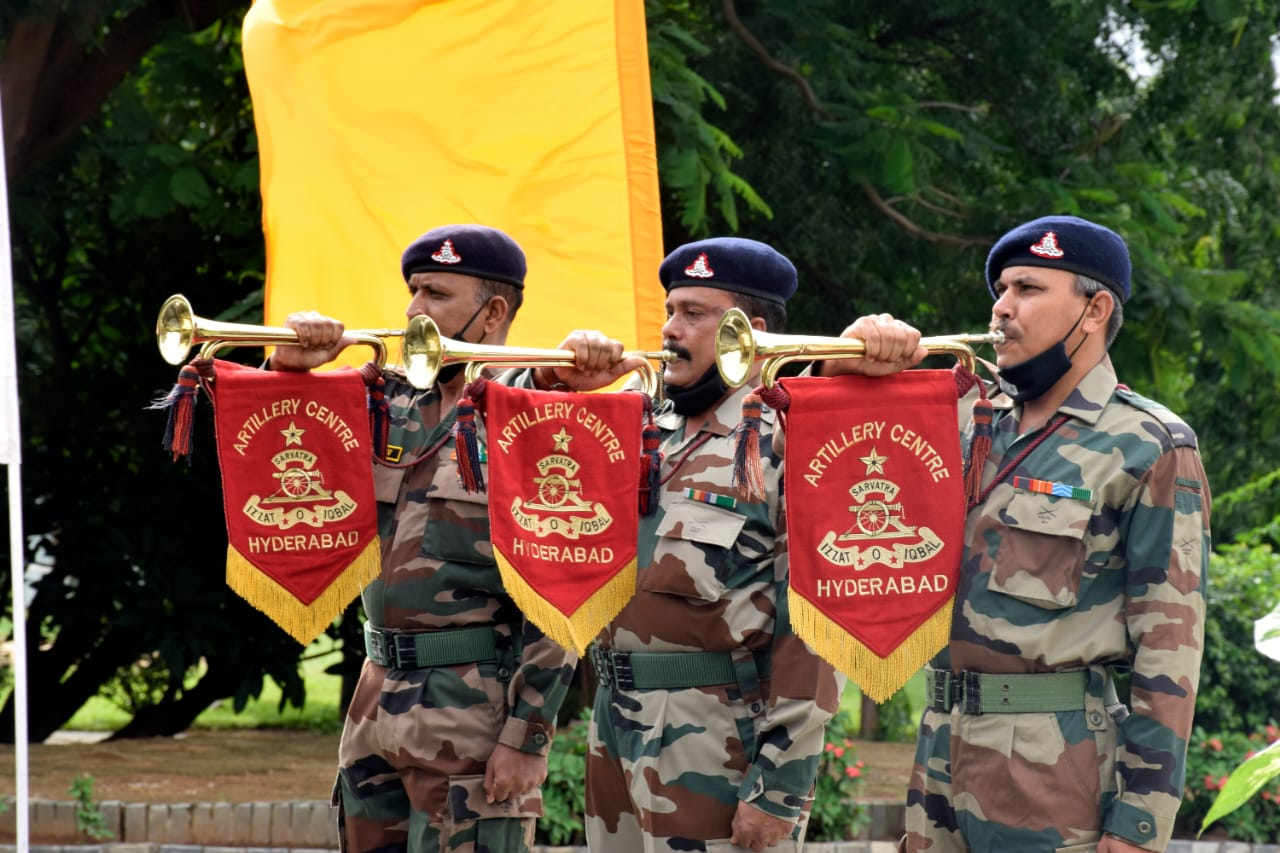
195th Gunners' Day celebration at Golconda Artillery Centre, Hyderabad, 28 September 2021

Golconda Artillery Centre, Hyderabad, was raised on 15 August 1962 as the Second Recruit Training Centre for the Regiment of Artillery. Golconda Artillery Centre is located in and around the Golconda fort. The Golconda centre has three training regiments and presently trains 2900 recruits at a time.

== UNESCO World Heritage ==
The Golconda fort and other Qutb Shahi dynasty Monuments of Hyderabad (the Charminar, and the Qutb Shahi Tombs) were submitted by the Permanent Delegation of India to UNESCO in 2010 for consideration as World Heritage Sites. They are currently included on India's "tentative list".

== Influences ==
=== In popular culture ===
- "Aline, reine de Golconde" (1760), story by Stanislas de Boufflers
- Aline, reine de Golconde (1766), opera by Pierre-Alexandre Monsigny
- Aline, reine de Golconde (1803), opera by Henri-Montan Berton
- Aline, reine de Golconde (1804), opera by François-Adrien Boieldieu
- Alina, regina di Golconda (1828), opera by Gaetano Donizetti
- The poem " The Tombs of the Kings of Golconda." by Letitia Elizabeth Landon was published in Fisher's Drawing Room Scrap Book, 1838.
- The Queen of Golconda (1863), Swedish-language opera by Franz Berwald
- Russell Conwell's book Acres of Diamonds tells a story of the discovery of the Golconda mines.
- René Magritte's painting Golconda was named after the city.
- John Keats' early poem "On receiving a curious Shell" opens with the lines: "Hast thou from the caves of Golconda, a gem / pure as the ice-drop that froze on the mountain?"
- Golconda is referenced in the classical Russian ballet La Bayadère (1877).
- Anthony Doerr's Pulitzer Prize–winning novel All the Light We Cannot See references the Golconda mines as the discovery place of the "Sea of Flames" diamond.
- In Patrick O'Brian's novel The Surgeon's Mate, a character describes a particularly valuable diamond as being worth "half Golconda".
- The term 'Golconda' is used in White Wolf's Vampire: The Masquerade table-top role-playing game to refer to a mystical state of enlightenment. Pursuit of Golconda is usually the ultimate aim of a campaign, although what this might entail is largely left to the storyteller's discretion.

=== Places named after Golconda ===
- A city in Illinois, United States is named after Golconda.
- A city in Nevada, United States is named after Golconda.
- A skatepark in New York City (Golconda Skate Park).
- A village in Penal–Debe, Trinidad and Tobago is named after Golconda.

== Gallery ==
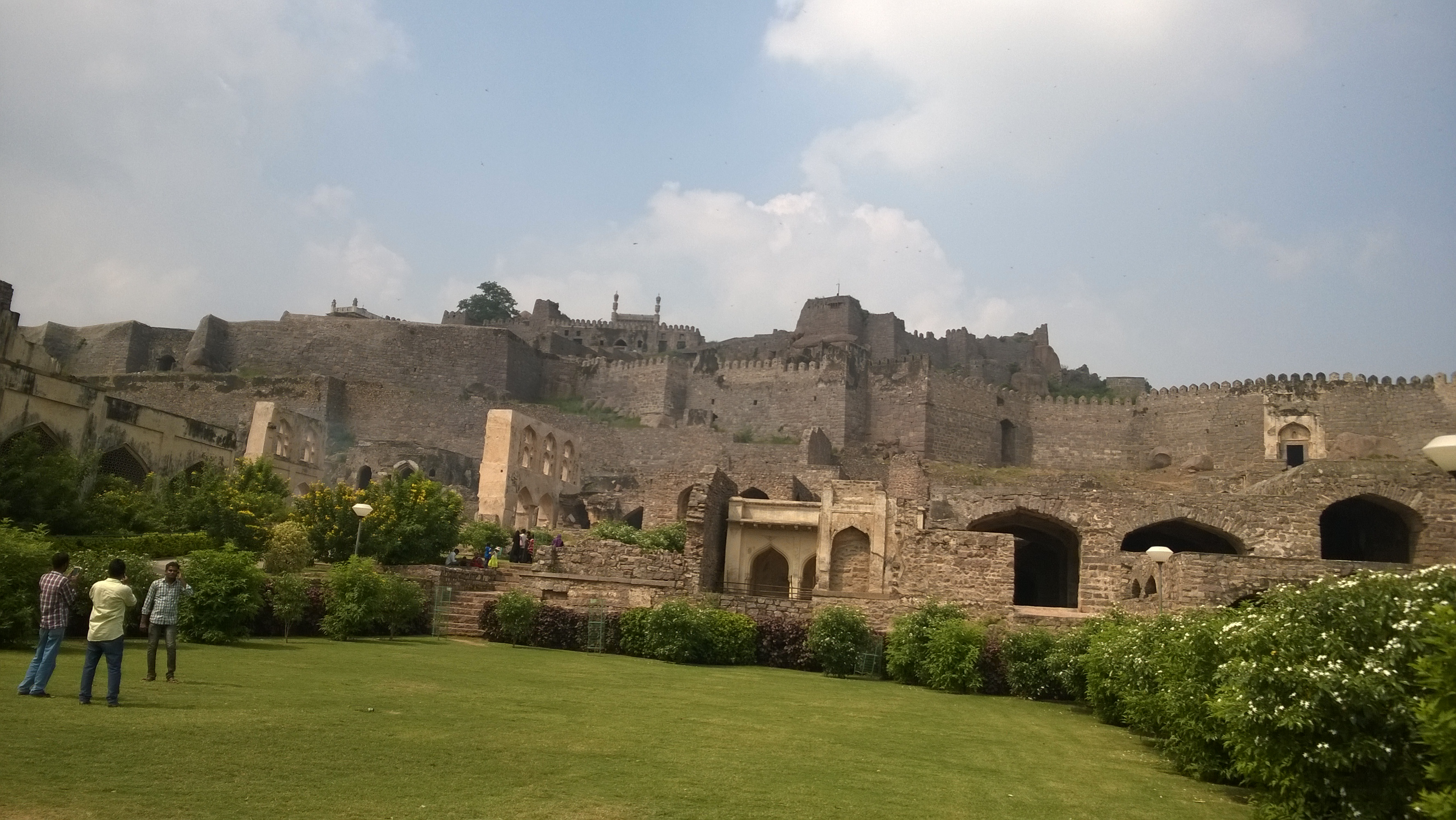
Golconda Fort—Large View

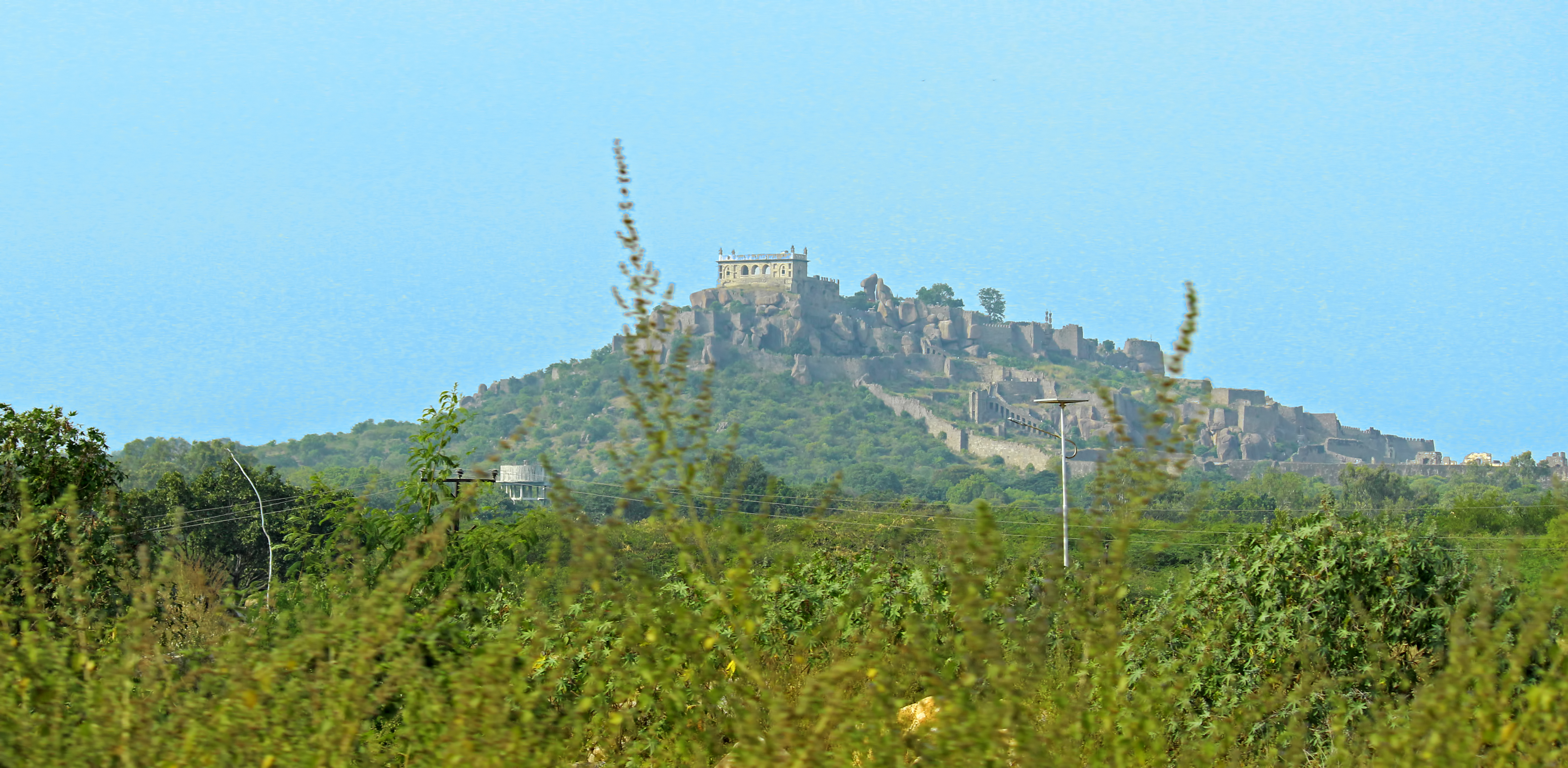
Golconda Fort seen from a road

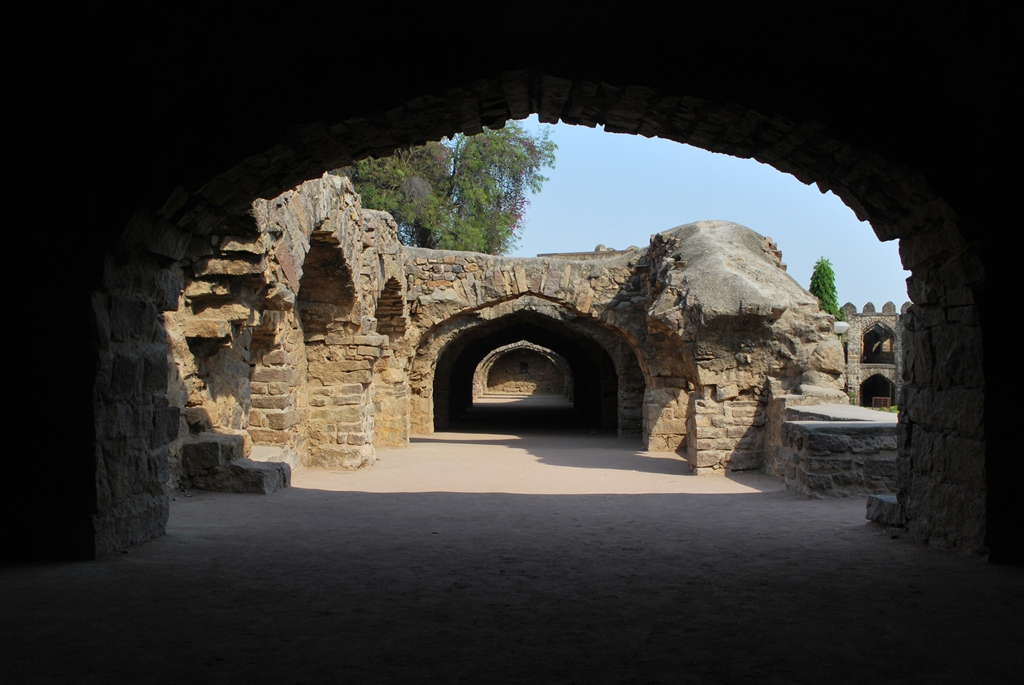
Stone Arch Ruins

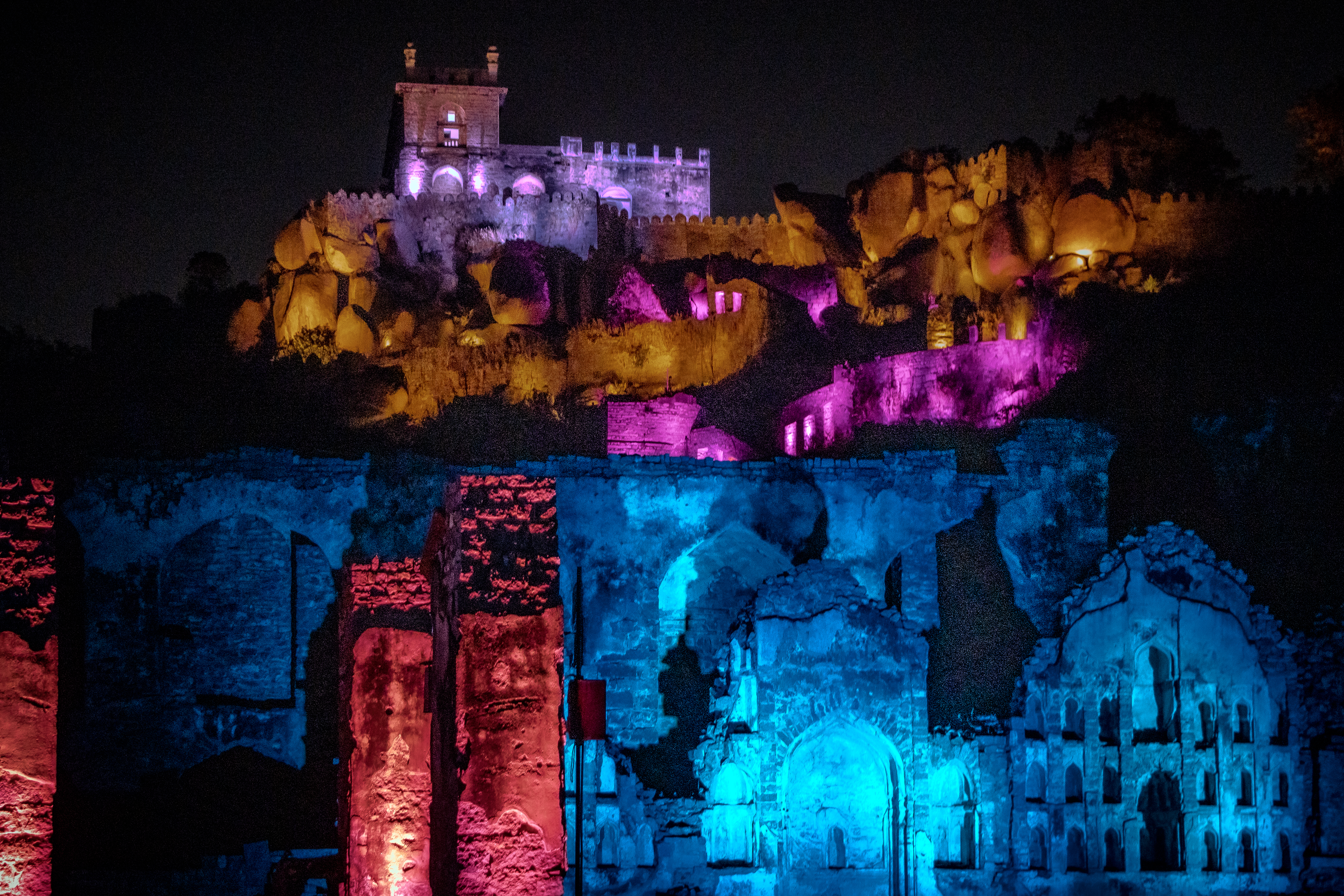
Golkonda during light show at night

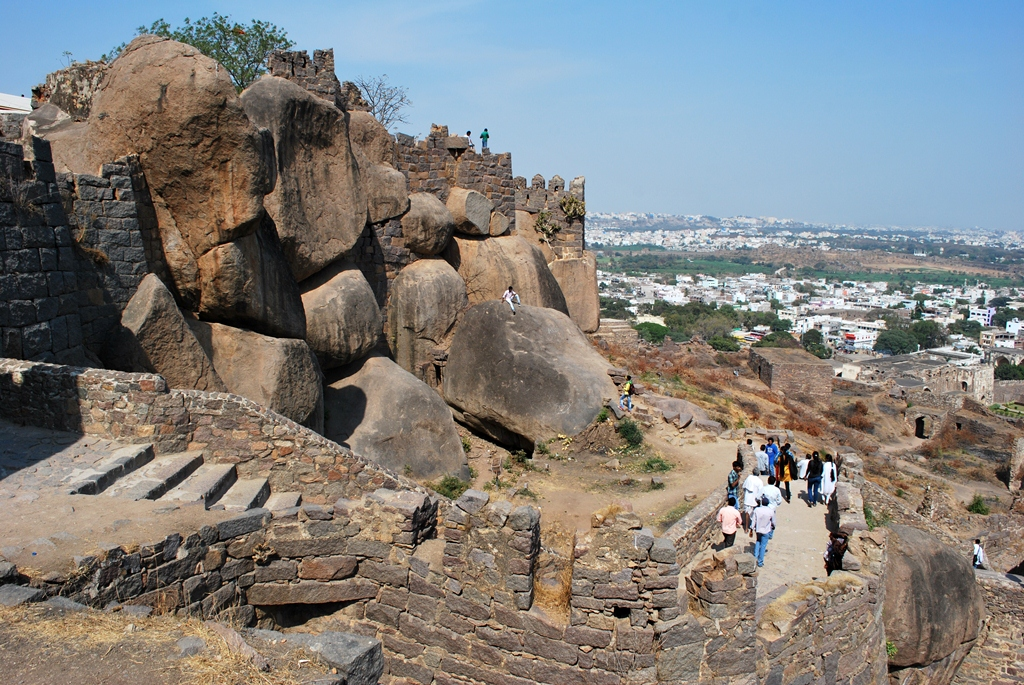
Fort overlooking the city

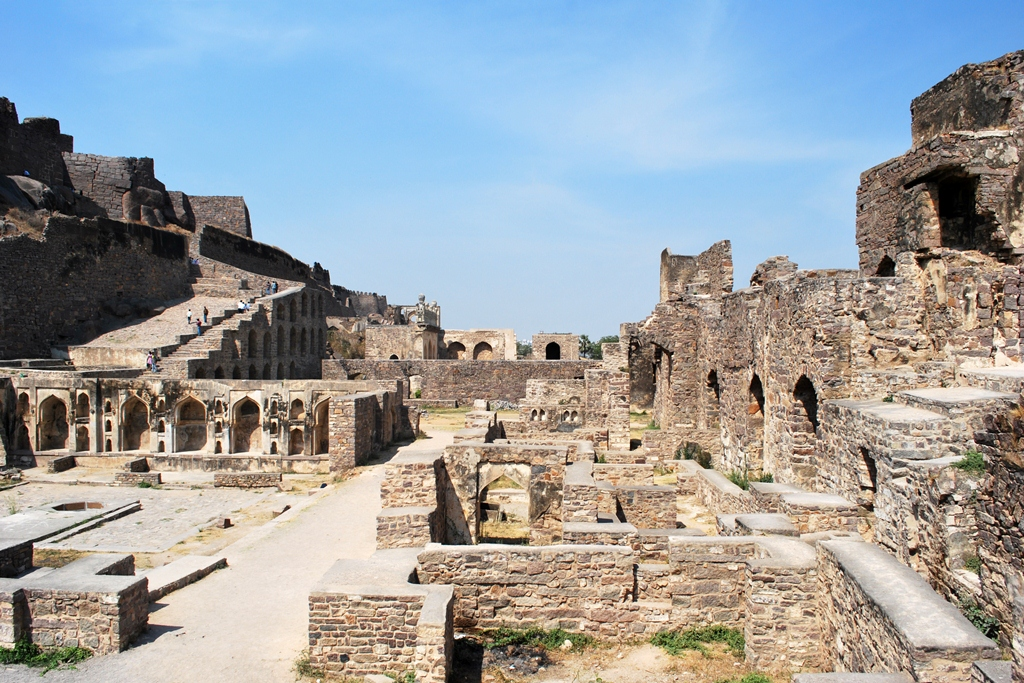
Staircase leading to the top of the Fort

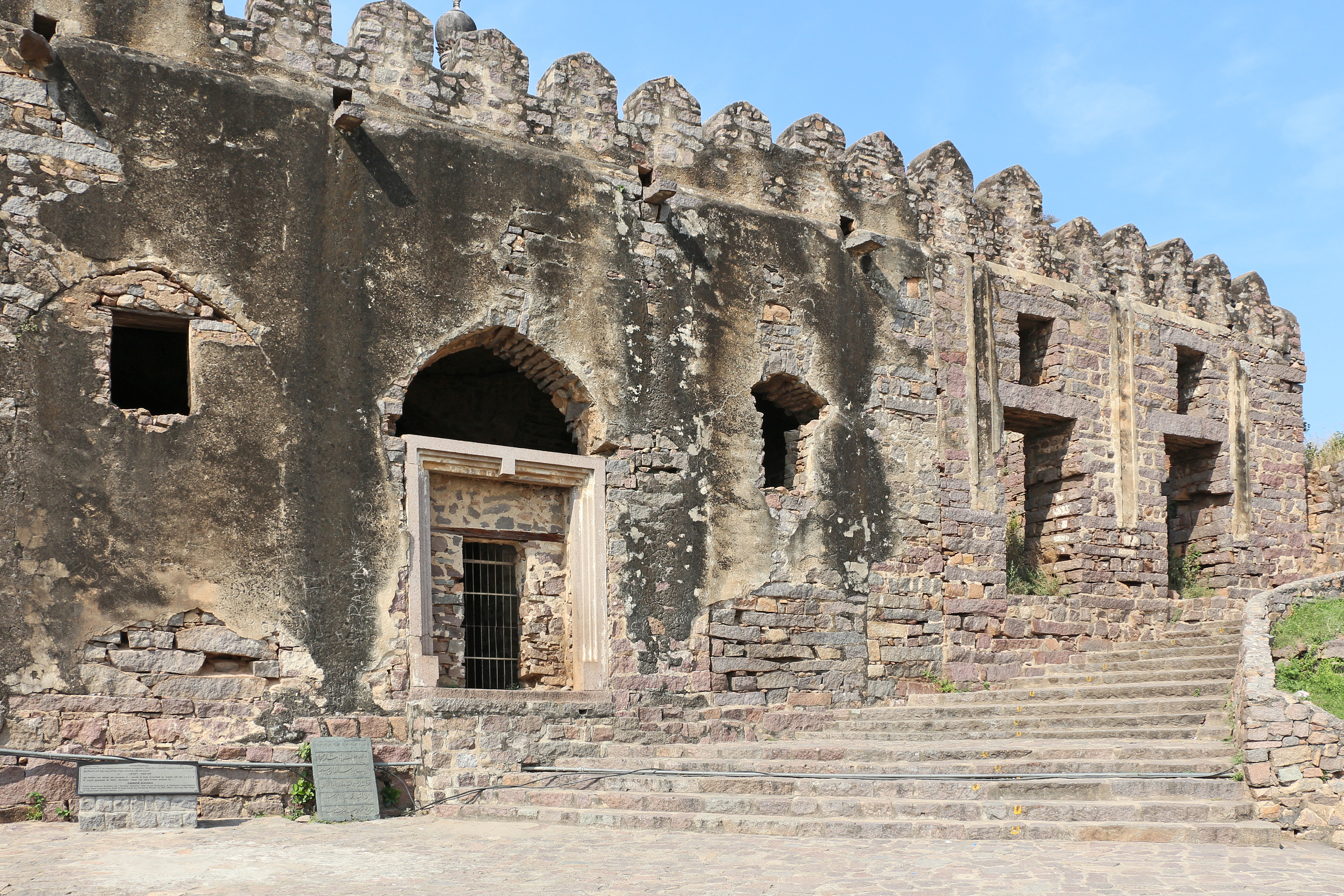
Ambar Khana

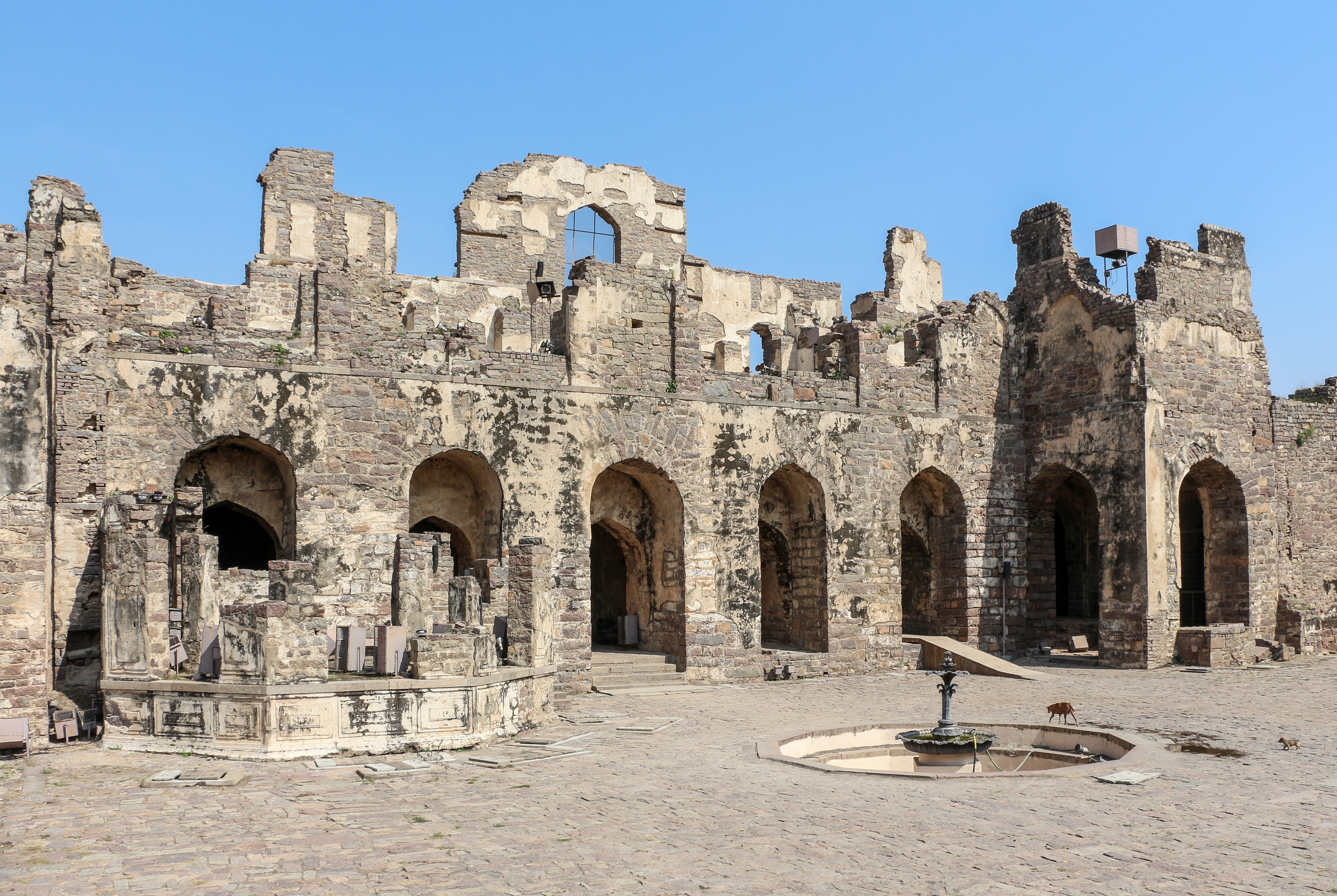
Rani Mahal

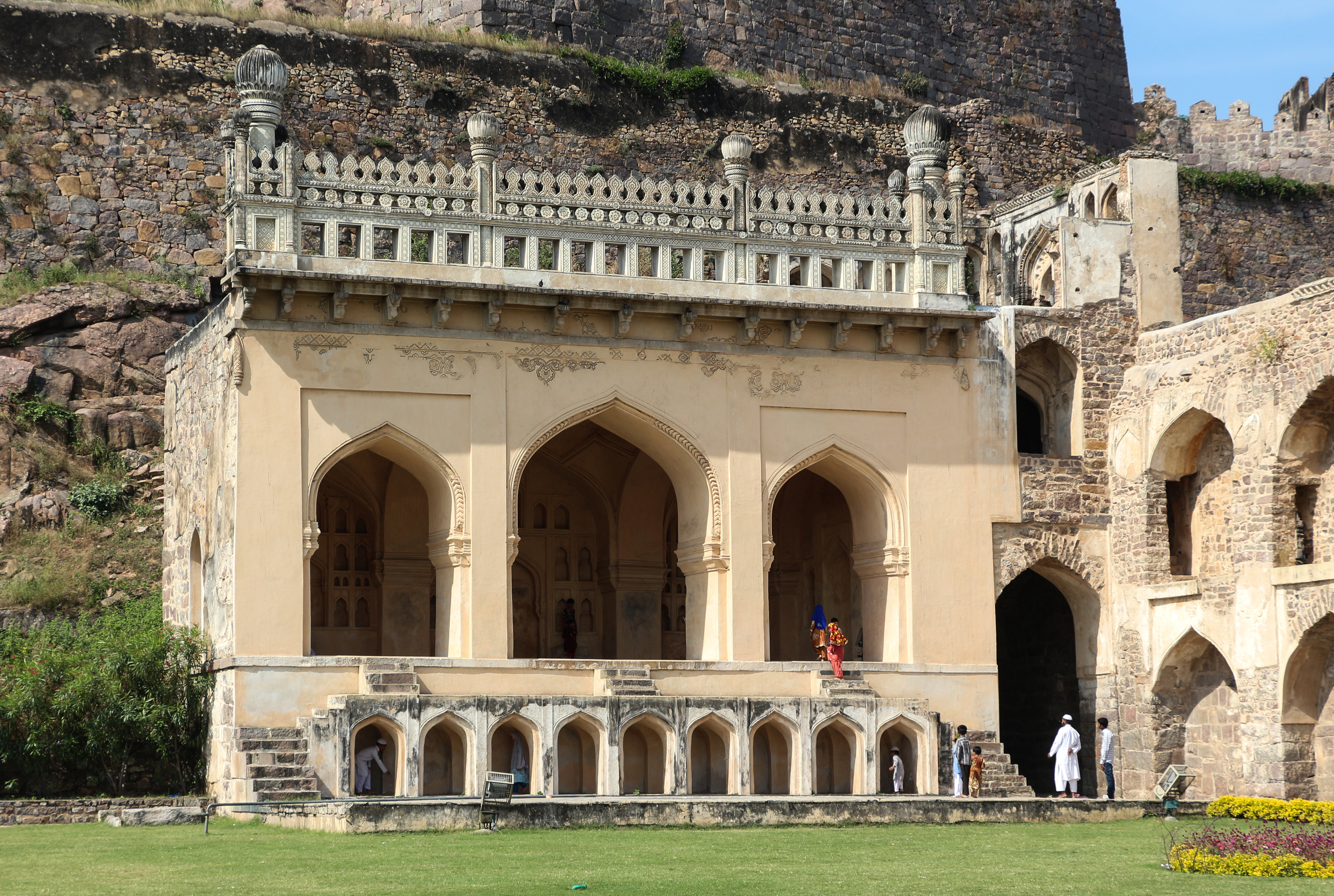
Taramati Mosque

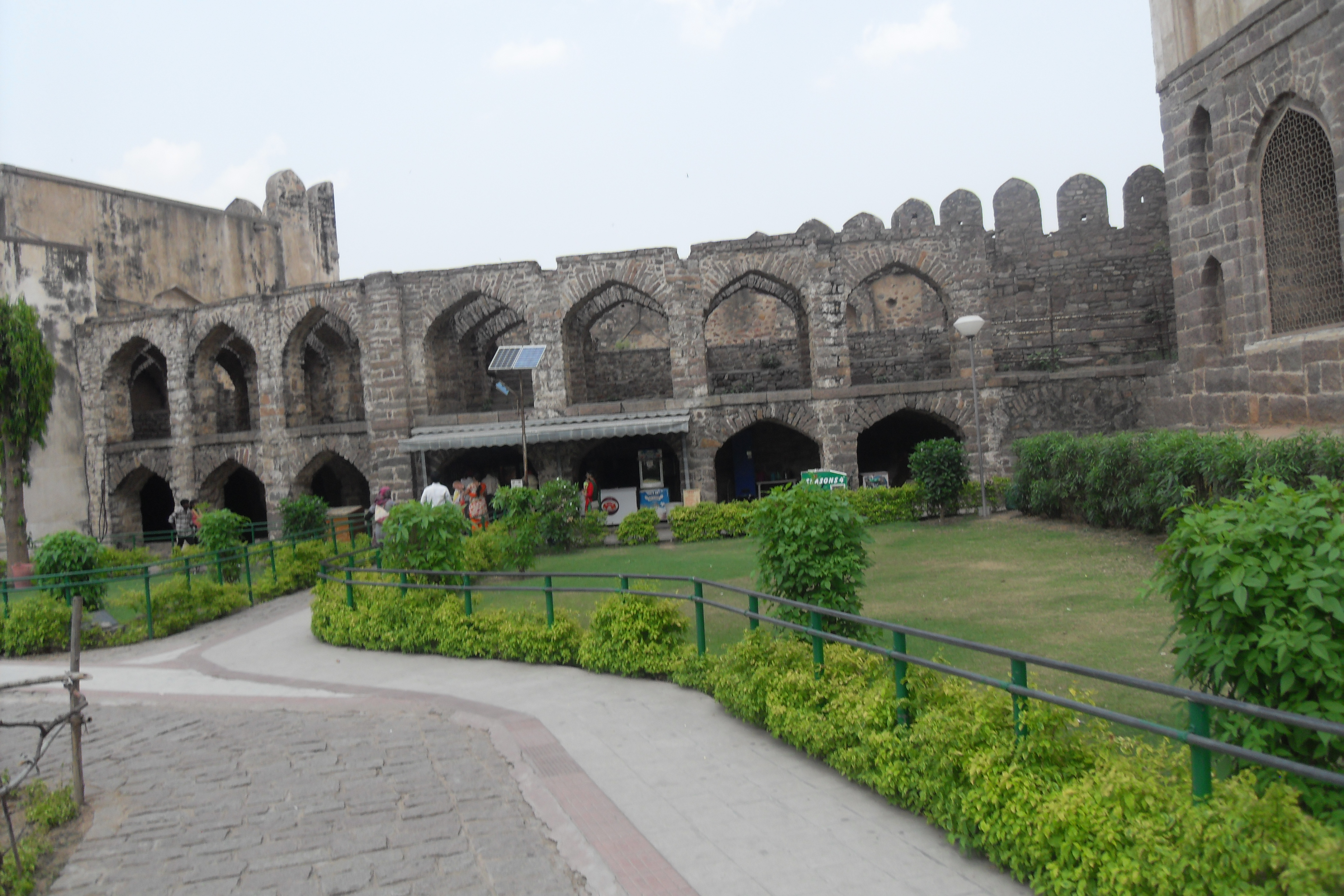
Golconda fort inside view

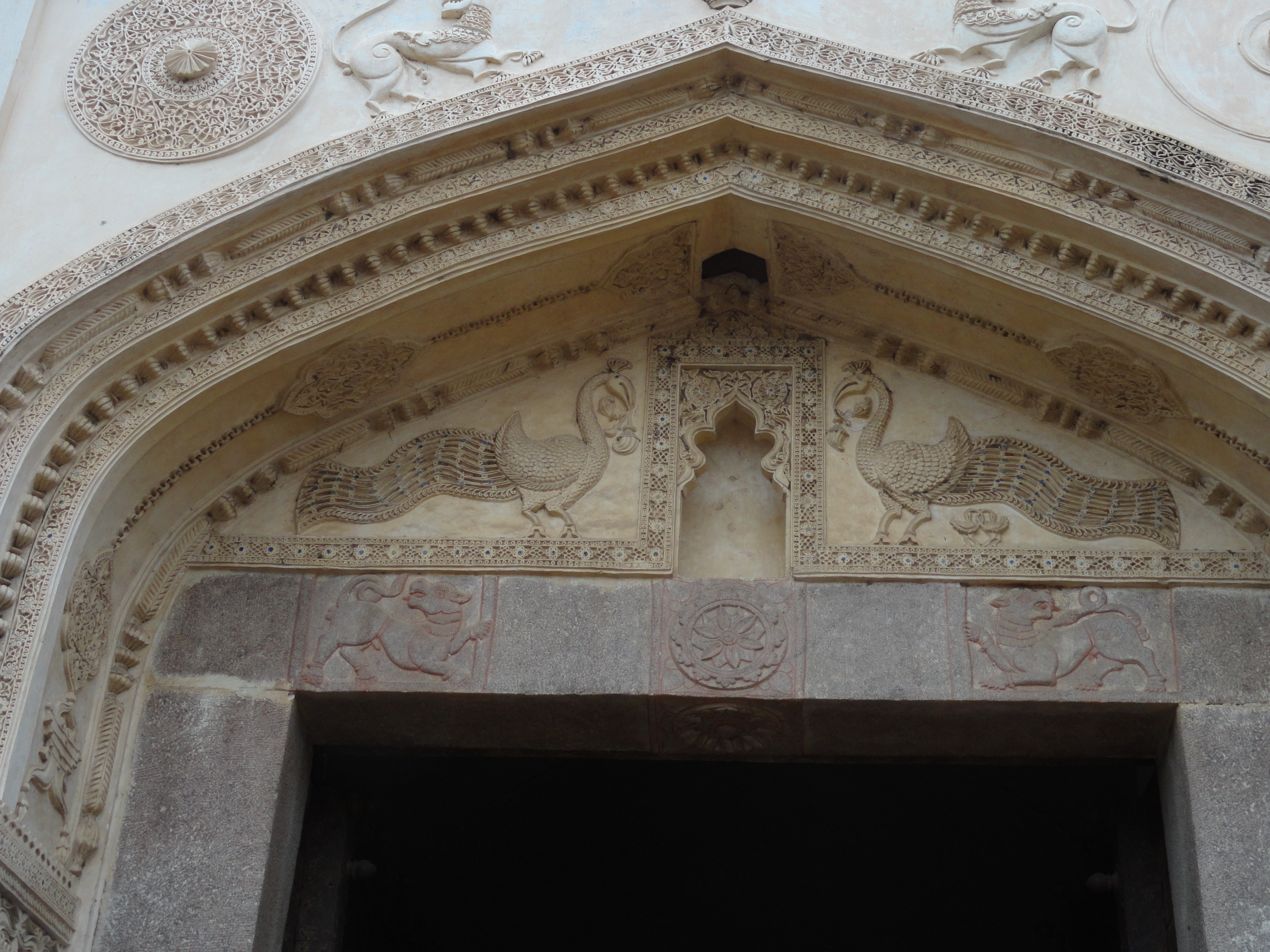
Architecture inside Golconda fort

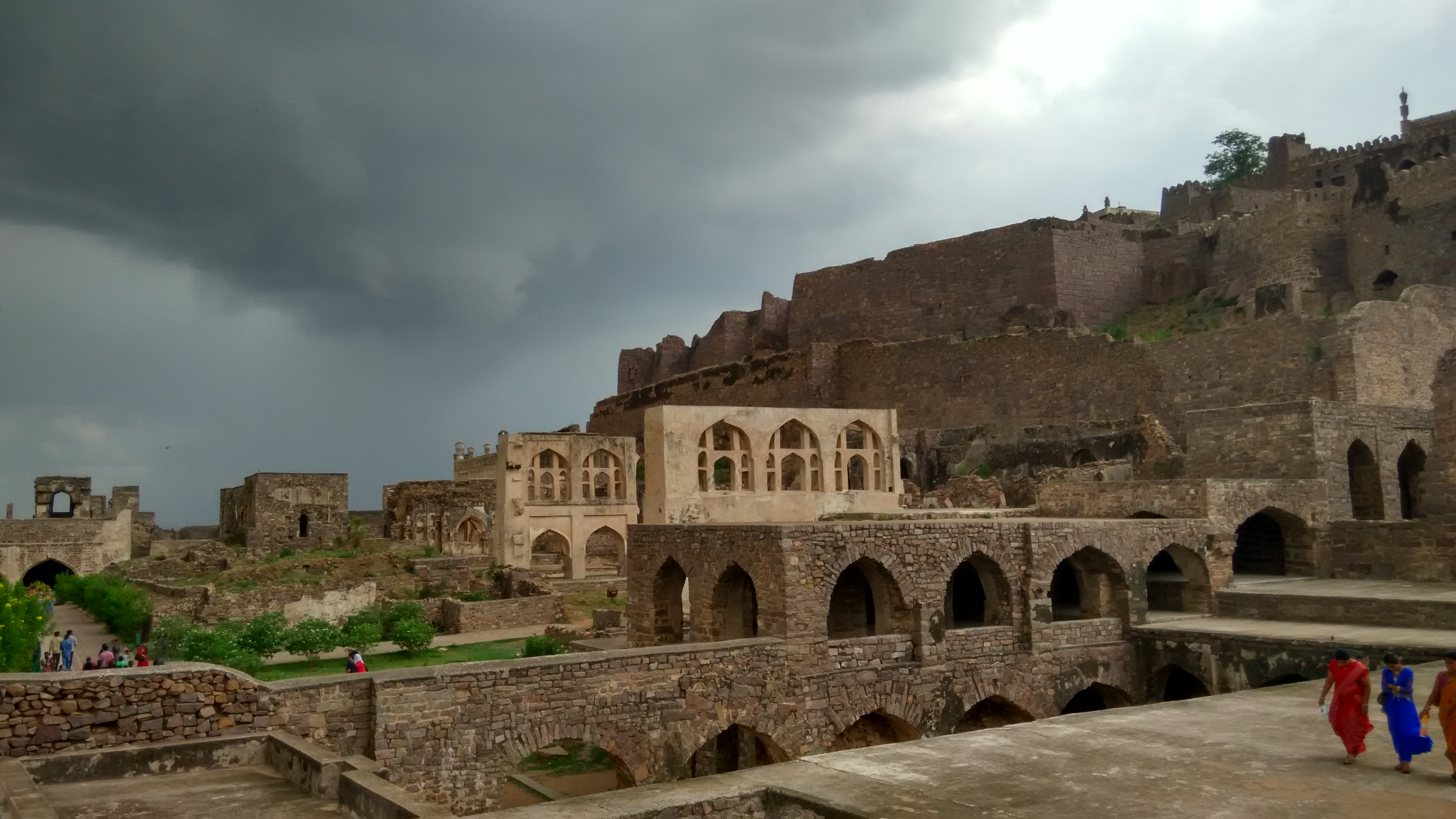
Golconda fort from inside

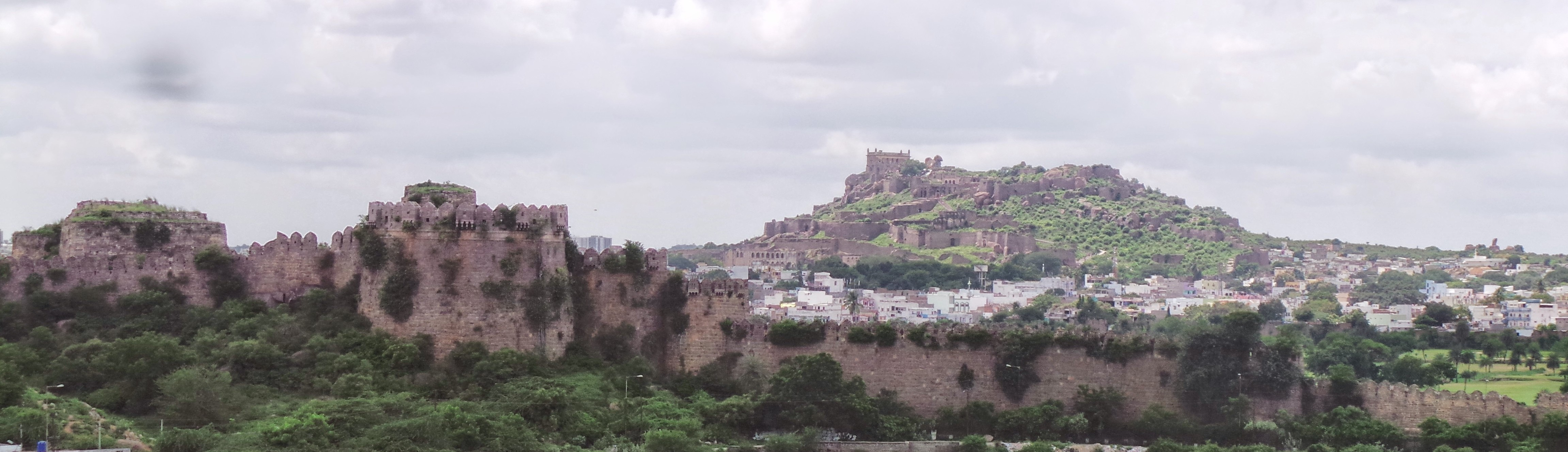
View of the Golconda fort

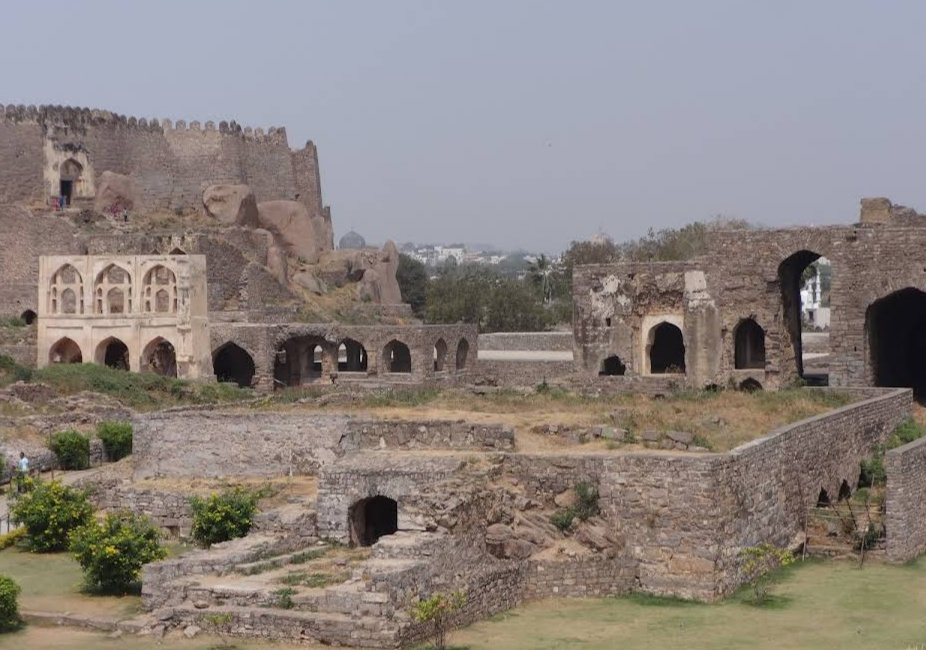
Golconda fort from outside

== See also ==
- Afanasy Nikitin—the first European to visit Golconda
- History of Hyderabad
- Taramati Baradari
