= Jagdamba =

Hindu goddess epithet

Jagadamba (Sanskrit: जगदम्बा, romanized: Jagadambā, lit. 'mother of the universe') is an epithet used to address a Hindu goddess, primarily applied to Durga, Lakshmi and Parvati in literature.

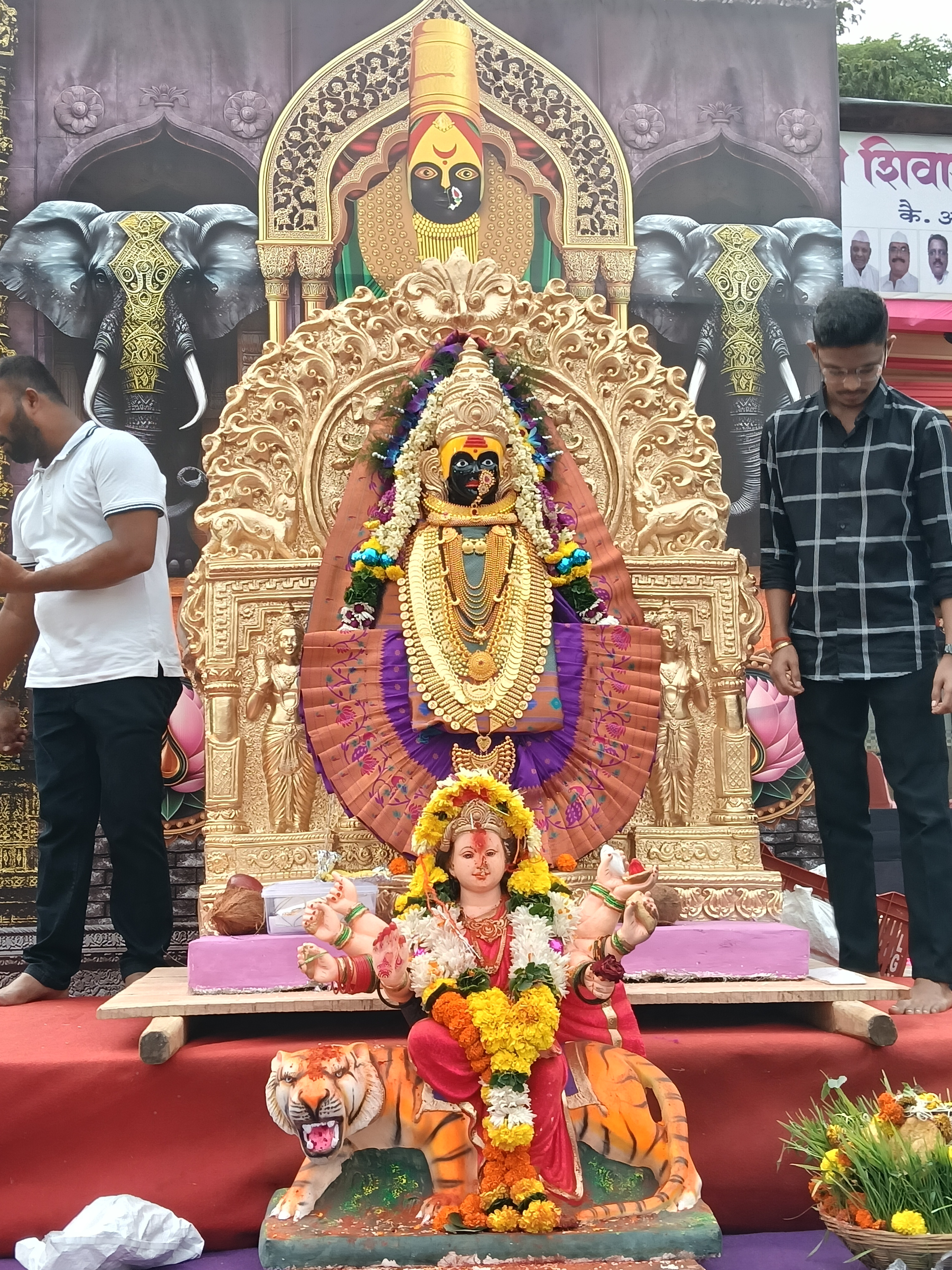
View of Idols of Mata Jagdamba (Durga) established at Annasaheb Garden in Koparkhairane, Navi Mumbai during Durga Puja festival.

== Literature ==
=== Ramcharitmanas ===
In Ramcharitmanas, a version of the Ramayana by Tulsidas, after Angada meets Ravana, the latter remarks thus:

नृप अभिमान मोह बस किंबा।
हरि आनिहु सीता जगदंबा॥
अब सुभ कहा सुनहु तुम्ह मोरा।
सब अपराध छमिहि प्रभु तोरा॥
सादर जनकसुता करि आगें।
एहि बिधि चलहु सकल भय त्यागें॥

This translates to:

"O King of Lanka, either out of pride or lust you had kidnapped Jagdamba (mother of the world) Sita, wife of Hari (Rama). The best course now would be to proceed with Shri Sita to restore her to Shri Rama without any apprehension".

== Temples ==
- Devi Jagadambi Temple, is a temple dedicated to goddess Parvati at Khajuraho, Madhya Pradesh, India.
- Mahalakshmi Ambabai Temple, is a temple dedicated to goddess Lakshmi in Kolhapur, Maharashtra, India
- Shree Jagadamba Devi Temple in Kasaragod, Kerala, India
- Shri Mahalakshmi Jagdamba Mandir Koradi in Nagpur, Maharashtra, India
