= Battle of Uttaramallur =

- Part of Vijayanagara Campaigns In South
| Date | 31 May 1601 |
| Location | Uttiramerur, India |
| Result | Vijayanagar victory |

Belligerents
| Vijayanagar Empire: Venkatagiri estate | Nayaks of Vellore: Chief of Uttiramerur; Supported by: Gingee Nayaks; Madurai Nayaks; Kalahasti Nayaks |

Commanders and leaders
| Venkatapati Raya; Velugoti Yachama Nayaka; Sarwagna Singama Nayaka | Davula Papa Nayaka (executed); Gadepdudi Ayyanna †; Keti Reddy †; Cintapatla Obanna †; Kandineni Venganna †; Kotapati Chennappa †; Krishnappa †; Panem Ramaraju †; Kalive Venkataraju †; Ayyaparaju †; Cina Chidambararaju †; Damarla Chennapa Nayaka (POW); Povela Venkataraju (POW); Timmaraju (POW); Suryanarayana (POW); Kumara Kalparaju (POW); Nagareddy (POW); Cappali Siddana (POW) |

Strength
| 3,000 | 30,000 Infantry; 12,000 Musketeer; 10,000 Archers; 500 Cavalry; 100 Elephants |

The Battle of Uttaramallur was a battle fought during the reign of Venkatapati Raya. Yachama Nayaka led the Vijayanagara army against Davula Papa Nayaka, who was the brother in law of Naga of Uttiramerur and a subordinate of Lingama Nayaka. Papa Nayaka had the support of several local chiefs and together they tried to rise against the emperor. Velugoti Yachama Nayaka defeated and killed Davula Papa Nayaka and several chiefs in the battle.

== Background ==
In the early years of the 1600 peace in the Tamil region was shaken by rebellions from the nayaks, who were unhappy with Emperor Venkatapati Raya’s control over their lands. Lingama Nayaka of Vellore had begun to act as independent king. To restrict his growing power Venkata granted the region of Perumbedu and Madurantakam to Yachama Nayaka, son of Velugoti Kasturi Rangappa. Yachama soon took charge of his new territory and made Madurantakam his base. From there he suddenly marched against the fort of Uttiramerur which belonged to Naga one of Lingama’s Subordinates and captured it. Naga then appealed to Lingama for support and Lingama prepared to regain the fort on his behalf.

Lingama Nayaka understood that removing Yachama from Uttaramallur would not be easy without a strong army. So he called for support from every chief loyal to him and also asked for help from the Nayaks of Madurai and Gingee. Many local chiefs joined him with their soldiers including those who controlled the forts of Tindivanam, Tiruvadi, Valadapuram, Vandavasi, Pengotur, Tiruvottiyur, Asamandur, Kattalai, and Arcot. The Nayaks of Madurai and Gingee also sent horsemen elephants, and additional troops. The long serving warriors of Lingama’s family from Padaiveedu along with other subordinate palaiyakkarars, also came to his support. Following Naga’s advice Lingama appointed Naga’s brother in law Davula Papa Nayaka as commander of the army and sent the forces towards Uttaramallur.

== Battle ==
Papa Nayaka marched at the head of a great army which included 100 elephants, 500 pairs of horses, 1,000 nobles in palanquins, 10,000 archers, 12,000 matchlockmen and 30,000 infantry. The force was also supplied with 7,000 rockets. After several days of marching Papa reached Uttiramerur on a Sunday in the year 1601. He set up his camp on the eastern side of the fort.

When Velugoti Yachama Nayaka saw the huge army approaching he decided to attack at once even though he had only about 3,000 soldiers against nearly 30,000. A fierce battle followed. Forty leading chiefs fighting in the front line were killed including Gadepudi Ayyana, Kotapati Chennappa, Krishnappa, Keti Reddy, Cintapatla Obanna, and Candineni Venganna. Damerla Chennappa Nayaka fought bravely but was badly wounded and taken prisoner and many others were injured. Davala Papayya who rushed forward with great force was killed in the fighting along with Kalive Venkataraju and his nephew Ayyaparaju, Panem Ramaraju, Cina Chidambararaju. The elephants were seized, the horses were cut down, and the troops including archers, rocketeers, and lancers were heavily pressed and scattered.

Povela Venkataraju, his brother Timmaraju, Suryanarayanendra, Kumara Kalaparaju, Nagareddi, and Cappalli Siddhanna were all captured in the fighting. The soldiers who tried to resist were cut down on the battlefield and those who survived fled in fear.

== Aftermath ==
Velugoti Yachama Nayaka won a great victory at Uttiramerur which made him very famous across the Vijayanagara Empire. he returned to the royal court where Venkatapati Raya welcomed him with honour. The Emperor rewarded him with clothes, jewels, and land. Soon after this victory unrest began among the nayaks in the Tamil region.

== See also ==
- Siege of Vellore (1603–1604)
- Nayaks of Vellore
- Venkatapati Raya
