= Velugoti Yachama Nayaka =

Indian military commander

Military General Raja of Venkatagiri estate
- In office 1590–1622
- Monarchs: Venkatapati Raya; Sriranga II; Rama Deva Raya

Personal details
- Parent: Velugoti Kasturi Ranga Nayaka (father)

Military service
- Allegiance: Vijayanagara Empire
- Battles/wars: Wars with Golconda; Siege of Penukonda; Battle of Pennar; Siege of Gandikota; Siege of Gooty; Siege of Kandanavolu; Campaign against mountain chiefs; Battle of Tirupati; Siege of Chengalpattu; Battle of Uttaramallur; Battle of Gingee (1608); Siege of Vellore (1603–1604); Battle of Toppur; Battle of Palemukota; Battle of Pulicat

Yachama Nayaka also known as Yacha Sura was one of the most trusted commanders of the Vijayanagara Empire. he protected the royal family during a time of civil war and played a significant role in supporting the rightful heir Rama Deva Raya. Yachama Nayaka fought several major battles, including the Battle of Toppur where his leadership helped defeat powerful enemies like Gobburi Jagga Raya and the forces of Madurai Nayaks and Gingee Nayaks. His efforts helped restore stability to the empire during its final years.

== Origin ==
Pedda Yachama Nayaka, also known as Yacha Sura, was the second son of Kasturi Rangappa Nayaka. He ruled the region of Perimidi, which was given to him by Venkatapati Raya and his capital was at Maduranthakam.

== Military career ==
=== Wars with Golconda ===
A large Vijayanagara Army of nearly one hundred thousand men led by Yara Timmaraja, Gulranga Setty, Manuparaju, Velugoti Chennapa, and Yachama Nayaka marched out with the aim of retaking Gandikota. To distract them, Murtaza Khan suddenly attacked Cuddapah and even destroyed the local temple. When news of this reached Venkatapati Raya he sent Yara Timmaraja and Manuparaju with ten thousand cavalry to deal with Murtaza Khan. They met him somewhere near Cuddapah but were defeated and forced to retreat. In spite of this victory Murtaza Khan gained nothing from it for it did not ease the pressure on the garrison still holding Gandikota.

When Muhammad Quli Qutb Shah learned how serious the situation had become for his army he placed five thousand horsemen under Rustam Khan and made him the chief commander of all forces in the south. Rustam Khan joined Murtaza Khan but immediately took full control and ignored Murtaza Khan's advice. He crossed the Pennar River and camped on wet black-cotton soil after recent rains. Seeing this move the Vijayanagara forces sent a bull decorated in an unusual way toward his camp. Whether the story is true or not Rustam Khan was said to be frightened and his sudden retreat caused confusion in his ranks. A major battle then took place on the banks of the Pennar River where the Bijapuri army was completely defeated. Velugoti Chennapa who fought with great distinction led the royal army along with his cousin Yaca to Gandikota and captured the fort. Once Gandikota fell the smaller forts nearby also surrendered. The defeated garrisons were driven back across the Krishna River and Sultan Quli was forced to accept the river as the boundary between his kingdom and the Vijayanagara Empire.

After the victory at Gandikota Yachama Nayaka continued his campaign. He moved against the nearby forts of Gooty and Kandanavolu (Kurnool) both important forts in the region. he managed to capture both places securing the area for the Vijayanagara Empire.

=== Battle of Mallur ===
When Yachama Nayaka and his followers took control of the fort at North Mallur, the local chief, Yaradi Nagappa Nayaka, quickly prepared a large force to stop him. He called his brave brother-in-law Davala Papa Nayaka and supported him with tributary chiefs, many Reddi warriors, and the elephants and cavalry sent by the rulers of Gingee and Tanjore. Altogether, this army had about 1,000 sardars, 100 elephants, 1,000 horsemen, and nearly 30,000 foot soldiers. They soon arrived at North Mallur, ready for battle. But Yachama Nayaka, joined by his younger brother Sarwagna Singama Nayaka, stood firm and fought back. Even though he had only about 2,000 men, he defeated the huge army completely. The enemy forces fled, and all the sardars were killed, including Papa Nayaka, who was beheaded on the battlefield.

=== Campaign against mountain chiefs ===
Yachama Nayaka later marched towards Tirumala near today's Tirupati in the Chittoor district. There he fought against the mountain chiefs and defeated them in a battle. After securing the region, he moved further south and captured Chengalpattu.

=== Battle of Toppur ===
When Venkatapati Raya died without a direct heir, he chose his nephew Sriranga II to succeed him. But his queen, Bayamma, wanted the throne for a Brahmin boy she had adopted, named Chenga Raya. Her plan led to a serious conflict in the empire. Bayamma's brother Gobburi Jagga Raya went so far as to kidnap and kill Sriranga II and almost his entire family. Only one young son survived. This shocking act angered the royal court and many powerful nayak commanders. Velugoti Yachama Nayaka, the commander of the imperial army rose in revolt and supported the surviving boy Rama Deva Raya as the rightful heir to the throne.

When Jagga Raya learned that Rama Deva Raya was staying in Kumbakonam he decided to kill him before he could claim the throne. To strengthen his plan, he won the support of the rulers of Gingee and Madurai by convincing them that he had the right to choose the next king. With these allies, he marched toward Kumbakonam. Hearing about this danger, Raghunatha Nayaka quickly set out to protect the young heir. On his way, he stopped for the night at Palamaneri before continuing his journey.

The next day, Raghunatha Nayaka joined by Yachama Nayaka prepared to face the combined forces of their enemies. The armies of Muttu Virappa Nayaka from Madurai, Gobburi Jagga Raya and Varadappa Nayaka from Gingee had all come together against them.

Early in the morning, the battle began with Raghunatha Nayaka ordering his cannons to fire, and the Madurai forces answering with their own. The guns kept firing for more than ninety minutes, until they became too hot to use. Many soldiers on both sides were killed during this exchange. At the right moment, Raghunatha Nayaka sent out his cavalry, which he had quietly kept hidden behind his infantry. Their sudden attack caused confusion and fear in the enemy ranks, forcing Muttu Virappa Nayaka and his commanders to withdraw from the field. The remaining Madurai infantry was surrounded and cut down without mercy. In the next phase of the fight, the infantry of Thanjavur moved in to take the place of their retreating cavalry, and the Madurai foot soldiers quickly fled.

Later, Gobburi Jagga Raya entered the battlefield with his army. The moment Raghunatha Nayaka saw Jagga's battle flag, he became furious and moved forward on his elephant. He ordered a heavy shower of arrows to be launched at the enemy. One of the Thanjavur commander remembering the king's oath to kill Jagga threw a spear with all his strength. The spear struck Jagga pierced through his armour and killed him on the spot. Seeing their leader dead, Jagga Raya's soldiers fled from the battlefield.

After Jagga Raya's fall, Muttu Virappa entered the battlefield again, this time with the support of the Gingee armies. To help the tired Thanjavur troops, Yachama Nayaka rode in with his own forces. With strong and steady attacks, he broke the formations of both the Madurai and Gingee soldiers, forcing them to retreat. The enemy withdrew completely, unable to continue the fight. By evening, the combined efforts of Raghunatha Nayaka and Yachama Nayaka brought a decisive victory.

=== Battle of Palemukota ===
Itiraja the brother of Gobburi Jagga Raya continued for some time to support the false claim to the throne, but his strength slowly faded. A report written by Fr. Rubino on November 29, 1617, says that Itiraja could no longer stand against the growing power of the young prince, Rama Deva Raya. He also noted that the boy, the true heir, was winning more victories every day. The Bahulasvacharitram mentions that Yachama Nayaka defeated Itiraja near Palemukota in South Arcot, proving how strong Rama's supporters had become. Captain Pedro Barreto de Rezende also wrote that the young king, who had grown up in hiding, began to win back parts of his kingdom with the help of a loyal followers led by Yachama Nayaka, Raghunatha Nayaka of Tanjore, and their allies, Rama Deva Raya was finally placed firmly on the throne of Ghanagiri (Penukonda).

=== Battle of Pulicat ===
After the great civil war ended in 1618, Itiraja, who had become the new leader of Gobburi Jagga Raya’s rebel group, moved north and gave up his fight for the Vijayanagara throne. Even though he had married his daughter to the emperor Rama Deva Raya he chose to live as an independent chief near Pulicat. Over time, he acted as the sole ruler of the area. On August 28, 1620, Itiraja even granted the territory known as Fort Geldria to the Dutch showing that he no longer followed the authority of the empire and had established his own power in the region.

The Pulicat region had first been granted to the Dutch by Emperor Venkatapati Raya in 1610. But because the emperor was old and weak at the time, the Dutch commander wanted an additional document to confirm the grant. He approached Gobburi Jagga Raya the local zamindar who lived about 40 miles away, and received a new confirmation toward the end of 1612. However, Gobburi Jagga Raya was killed during the civil war in 1617, and after the war the Dutch again asked for a fresh confirmation from his brother Itiraja. This new document, issued in 1620, stated that Itiraja ruled over forty native miles around Pulicat. In fact, the Englishmen Mills and Milward, who settled there in 1622, also described him as the lord of that region.

Rama Deva Raya grew increasingly unhappy with the way Itiraja, his father-in-law, was refusing to obey the crown. To control the situation, he sent one of his most trusted generals to act against him. In some records, this general appears under different spellings, which has led to the belief that he may have been Chennapa Nayaka, the brother-in-law of Yachama Nayaka. However, many historians think the commander was actually Yachama himself, as he had always been loyal to the throne and had a long-standing rivalry with Itiraja. It is believed that Yachama was appointed for this campaign toward the end of 1621 and began moving against Itiraja soon after. The final military action took place only at the end of 1622.

==== English and Dutch Reports on This Conflict ====
English Reports said that “our old friend Chemenique (Yachama Nayaka)” was marching toward the region with two or three thousand soldiers. His approach created so much fear among the local people that many of them fled to Pulicat with all their belongings. Within a week more than two thousand people had taken shelter there. No one knew what would happen next and everyone waited anxiously to see how events would unfold. During this time heavy rains fell for several days flooding the area around Pulicat. The water formed a natural barrier giving the town protection from any attack and bringing some relief to the worried residents.

Heavy rains had already fallen, and the locals expected even more. The enemy moved forward with only a small force but did not dare to come near Pulicat. Instead, he began causing trouble just as he had the previous year. He attacked an empty village about three miles from Pulicat and set it on fire even though the people living there had fled two days earlier. Because the whole countryside was flooded and the enemy soldiers were struggling in the wet conditions it seemed they burned the empty houses simply to warm themselves.

On the 20th of October he entered a small village near Pulicat burnt it entirely and in that place set up a fort of mud and other mixed materials. This work he completed within two days, having brought many labourers for that purpose.

Upon hearing of this, Itiraja, who is lord of those parts gathered between four and five thousand men and on the 28th laid siege to the said fort. The enemy within numbered no more than three hundred yet held out for a short time. The Dutch seeing Itiraja in need sent him two pieces of ordnance with several gunners. The enemy fearing the worst then asked for safe conduct if they surrendered. This was granted and the guns were returned to the Dutch on the 30th.

Not long after a man of some standing intervened pretending to seek peace. He divided the land between the two parties by a river and writings were exchanged. Believing the agreement firm Itiraja dismissed his forces and proceeded as far as Pulicat on his way home leaving the captured fort nearly empty, its weak walls partly thrown down.

That same night the enemy leader, Cemenique, returned with nearly two thousand men. He raised the fort anew made it larger and placed five hundred soldiers within it. Cemenique himself now lies close by with almost ten thousand men, no more than three miles from Pulicat.

When Itiraja learned of this treachery despite all vows and promises made on both sides he fell into great anger. Calling his brothers and allies for assistance, he again assembled four thousand men and encamped within a mile of the enemy awaiting further support. He is spoken of as a man of stout courage though lacking in money while the other side is well supplied.

Both parties contend for land to which neither has true claim taking advantage of the young king's weak authority. What may come of these disturbances cannot yet be judged but it is feared our trade and business will suffer greatly.

Cemenique aims to bring Pulicat under his rule believing the people here possess great wealth. His intention as is commonly reported is to strip them of their riches and let them alone only when they have gathered more for him to take. The fort he now controls lies directly on the high road into the country which makes his position the more dangerous.

Pulicat itself offers little except the labour of those who dwell here. Most of our painted cloth is made in villages across the flooded country, which cannot be safely reached in these troubled times. With burnings and plundering on all sides the people have little heart to work. The Dutch governor upon his arrival finding the English lodged in a small cottage placed them in a better house belonging to a gunner who had been sent to Batavia for some offence.

On the 6th of November, when the letter containing this report was written, Itiraja had about four thousand soldiers with him and he was expecting more men each day. A Dutch letter tells us that the Dutch at Pulicat also helped him during this second conflict. They gave him sixty or seventy rials and promised him some cannon just as they had done earlier.

The English factors at Pulicat wrote that these continuing troubles might ruin their business. They greatly feared that their negotiations would be hindered, if not completely lost, should the fighting continue.

It appears, however, that the support Itiraja awaited reached him in good time. Mills writes six days later that the enemy Yachama Nayaka had withdrawn though he still held the fort. This suggests that Yachama's main army had retreated but his men continued to defend the fort.

After this we hear no further news of the fighting near Pulicat which likely means that Itiraja gained a final victory. Yet it also seems that he later accepted the authority of Rama Deva Raya for the factors at Armagaon wrote that the king had recovered all his former lands except those held by “our Nayaka of this place.”

== See also ==
- Battle of Toppur
- Venkatapati Raya
- Raghunatha Nayaka
