= Siege of Gandikota =

Conflict between the Vijayanagar Empire and Golconda Sultanate

Coordinates: 14.8132°N 78.2874°E

- Part of Deccani–Vijayanagar wars
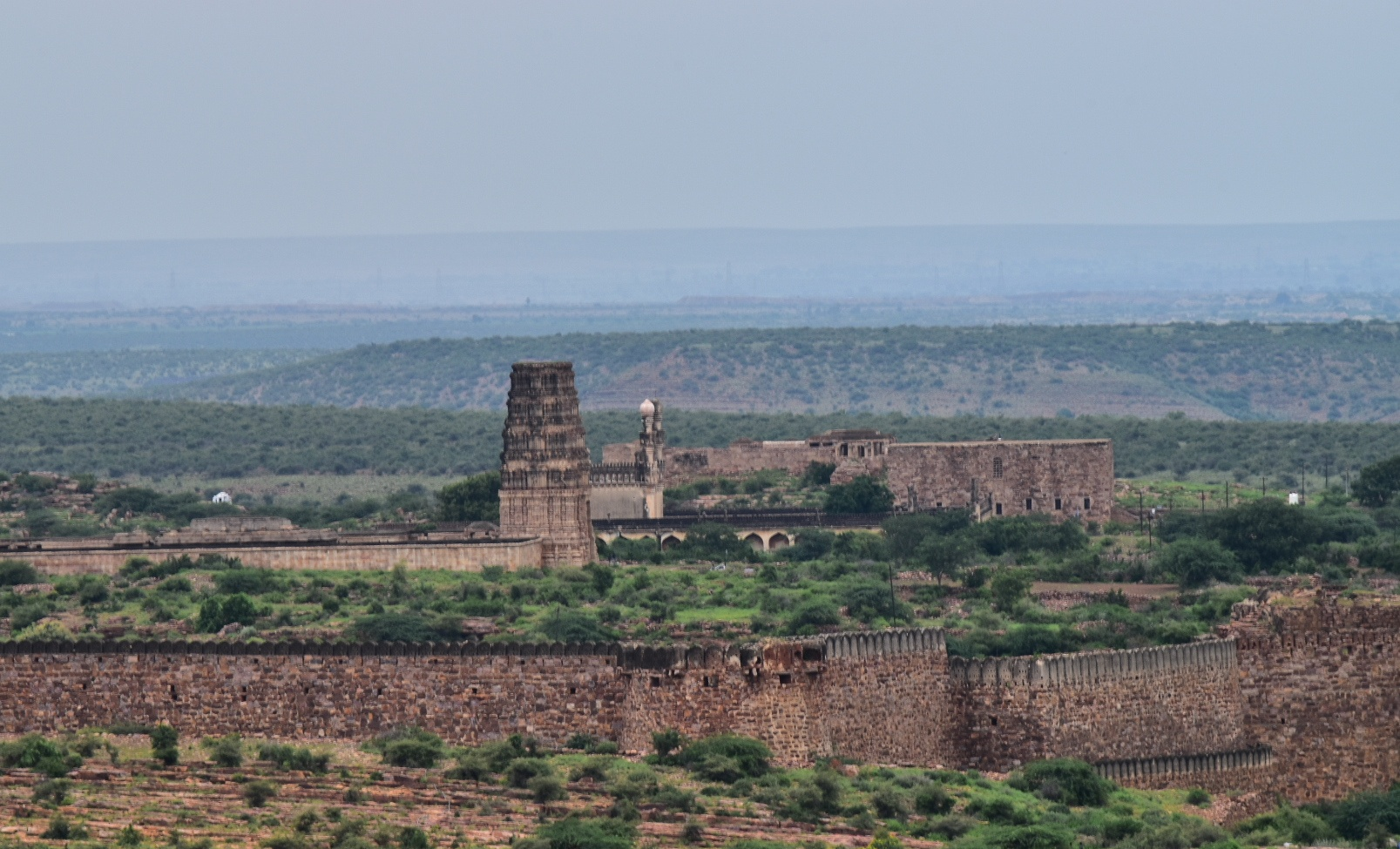
- Gandikota Fort
Date	Unknown
Location	Gandikota, Andhra Pradesh, India
Result	Vijayanagar victory
Territorial changes	Gandikota captured by Vijayanagara Army

Belligerents
Vijayanagar Empire; Supported by: Vijayanagara Vassals: Venkatagiri estate; Matli Chiefs	Golconda Sultanate

Commanders and leaders
Venkatapati Raya; Velugoti Yachama Nayaka; Velugoti Chennapa; Matla Anantaraju	Sanjar Khan

The Siege of Gandikota was a conflict between the Golconda Sultanate and the Vijayanagara Empire. Venkatapati Raya wanted to capture Gandikota fort, so he sent Velugoti Yachama Nayaka and Velugoti Chennapa to capture the fort. Inside the fort Sanjar Khan and his men put up strong resistance. Muhammad Quli Qutub Shah tried to send help twice, but his forces were defeated at Kamalakur and again near the Pennar River. After nearly three months of siege, the defenders could no longer hold out. Gandikota fell into the hands of Venkatapati Raya’s army.

== Background ==
=== Defeat of Muhammad Quli Qutub Shah at Penukonda ===
Sultan Muhammad Quli Qutb Shah marched south and surrounded the Vijayanagara capital. His attack came suddenly and Venkatapati Raya did not have enough time to gather all his nobles and prepare a full defence. To delay the enemy he sent his minister Goparaju Timma and his general Papayya Setty to negotiate a temporary peace. The sultan agreed and pulled back for a short time. Venkatapati Raya immediately used this break to strengthen the fortress, bring in food, and gather a large army inside the city. When the sultan returned and tried to renew the siege he found the fort far stronger than before. A battle fought near Penukonda and the Vijayanagara Army defeated the invaders forcing the Golconda army to withdraw.

== Siege ==
Venkatapati Raya then moved against the remaining Golconda garrisons starting with the strong fort of Gandikota at the head of the Penneru valley. He surrounded the fort and began the siege. Sanjar Khan the commander of the fort was known for his courage and resisted the attack with all the troops he had. However the forces under Murtaza Khan who oversaw the nearby conquered regions were too few to provide any real help.

=== Defeat of Golconda's first relief force at Kamalakuru ===
Muhammad Quli Qutb Shah sent Afzal Khan from Kondavidu to help the garrison at Gandikota but Venkatapati Raya quickly learned of this plan. He ordered Kowlananda to stop the reinforcements and Kowlananda’s son-in-law Woorias Ray led a raid that devastated the Kondavidu region badly. In reply Afzal Khan encouraged local chiefs to attack the lands around Udayagiri. A large group of Uriya and Manne chiefs gathered and advanced as far as Kamalakur while another group under a Ravilla leader pushed south and captured the fort of Gurramkonda. Venkatapati Raya then sent Matli Ananta and Velugoti Kasturi Ranga to drive them out. They reached Kamalakur quickly and defeated the invaders in a hard battle. Kasturi Ranga chased the fleeing troops back to their border while Ananta marched to Gurramkonda and besieged the fort. The defenders fought fiercely with strong artillery but Ananta continued the attack until one of the bastions collapsed forcing the garrison to surrender. After this victory Ananta returned towards Gandikota where his forces struck Asvaraya’s cavalry and defeated them near the fort.

=== Defeat of second Golconda relief force at Pennar River ===
Sultan Muhammad Quli Qutub Shah’s earlier attempt to send help from Kondavidu had failed because Kuwlananda and Woorias Ray blocked the way. So he next sent five thousand cavalry from Golkonda under Rustam Khan whom he made the main commander in the south. Rustam Khan was proud but not very experienced in fighting in the Karnataka region. Ignoring the advice of Murtaza Khan the local military governor he crossed the Pennar River and set up camp on the other side where the ground was soft and muddy from recent rains. The Vijayanagara soldiers dressed a red bullock with gold coloured horns, bright paint, and bells and sent it towards the Golconda camp. Rustam Khan who was standing in front panicked at the strange sight and rode back in fear which caused confusion among his own men. Seeing the disorder the Vijayanagara Army surrounded the enemy with their musketeers and attacked from all sides. The Golconda cavalry could not move fast on the heavy black soil and were shot down one after another. They might have been completely annihilated if Murtaza Khan had not gathered a small group and broken through the enemy lines allowing many of his men to escape. It was likely during this incident that Matla Ananta defeated Asvaraya’s strong cavalry near Gandikota.

== Aftermath ==
This defeat was soon followed by the total rout of Rustam Khan’s army and Gandikota was captured by Velugoti Chennappa. As a result the boundary of Golconda Sultanate was pushed back to the Krishna River leaving Kondavidu as the only stronghold the Sultan still held on the southern side. When Muhammad Quli Qutb Shah heard about this disastrous loss he immediately dismissed Rustam Khan from his post and expelled him from the kingdom.

== See also ==
- Battle of Pennar
- Venkatapati Raya
- Golconda Sultanate
