= Siege of Vellore (1603–1604) =

Event in the Indian state of Tamil Nadu

- Part of Vijayanagara Campaigns In South
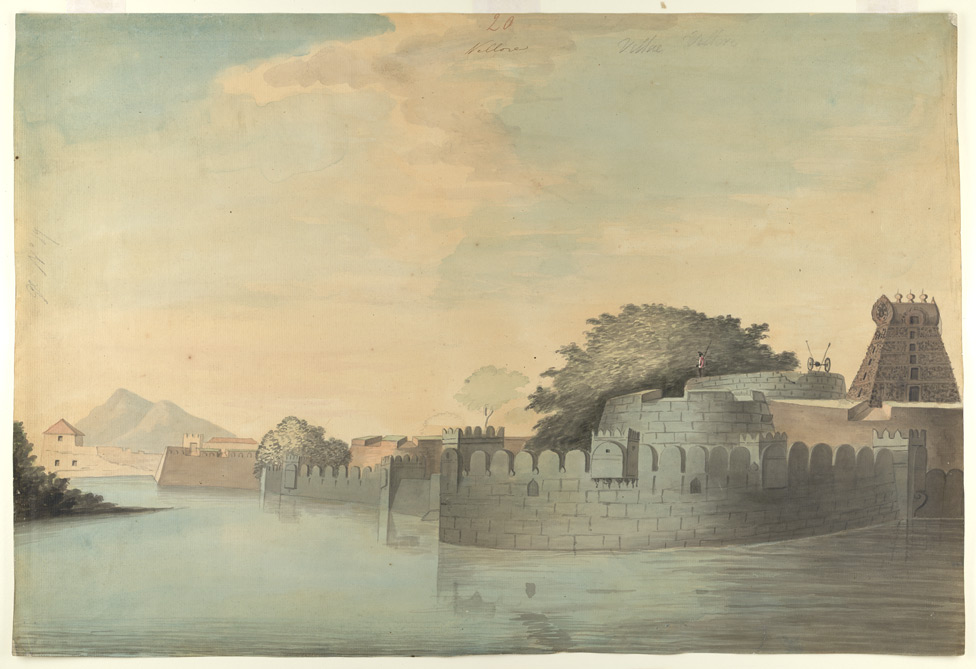
- Painting of Vellore Fort
Date	October 1603 – 9 January 1604
Location	Vellore, India
Result	Vijayanagar victory
Territorial changes	End of Nayaks of Vellore; Vellore Became Capital

Belligerents
Vijayanagar Empire: Nayaks of Kalahasti; Venkatagiri estate	Nayaks of Vellore

Commanders and leaders
Venkatapati Raya; Damarla Chennapa Nayaka; Velugoti Yachama Nayaka	Lingama Nayaka (POW)

The Siege of Vellore was a major Siege battle in which the Vijayanagara forces tried to bring Lingama Nayaka under control after he rebelled. Vellore was a strong and well fortified place making the siege long and difficult. The Vijaynagara commander Damarla Chennapa Nayaka first tried to take the fort by a quick surprise attack but the defenders pushed him back. He then surrounded the fort and kept up the pressure for months even through heavy rains. During the siege Lingama was captured outside the fort and brought to the Vijayanagara camp but his sons and soldiers continued to resist. In early 1604, Emperor Venkatapati Raya himself arrived with a large army. the fort fell and the emperor entered Vellore.

== Background ==
In the year 1603 Lingama Nayaka rose in rebellion against the emperor Venkatapati Raya and acted on his own authority. According to the Jesuit account that describes this incident, Lingama aimed to establish a small independent territory for himself free from the control of both the Nayak of Gingee and the emperor. He relied heavily on his great wealth and on the strong defenses of Vellore Fort which was considered almost impossible to capture. Confident in these advantages he openly challenged both the Krishnappa Nayaka of Gingee And Venkatapati Raya's Authority.

In October 1603, Emperor Venkatapati Raya quickly sent his Dalavay, or commander to attack the stronghold of Lingama Nayaka. The Jesuit account describing the event does not mention the general’s name, but the Bahulasvacharitram records that Damarla Chennapa Nayaka of the Kalahasti family defeated Linga of Vellore on the plains of Munnali and went on to capture the heavily fortified fortress of Vellore. Based on this clear reference Damarla Chennapa Nayaka is identified as the commander who led the Vijayanagara army against Lingama Nayaka and successfully brought the rebellion under control.

== Siege ==
When the march toward Vellore began the Damarla Chennapa Nayaka tried to reach the fort by surprise before sunrise by pushing his troops through the night. The plan failed because only the vanguard reached Vellore early in the morning, while the rest of the army arrived late. By then the garrison was fully prepared and Damarla Chennapa Nayaka and his men were met with heavy gunfire as they attempted to storm the city forcing them to fall back. Despite this setback and the arrival of the rainy season Damarla Chennapa Nayaka surrounded the fortress and kept it under siege for two months. During this time two officers from his army who were on friendly terms with Lingama Nayaka were allowed into the fort to pay their respects. When they returned to camp, Lingama himself escorted them a short distance outside the gate. At that moment Chenna’s soldiers seized him and took him prisoner.

The siege continued for a long time as Lingama’s sons and his generals refused to surrender even after their chief had been captured. Realising he had no way to escape Lingama offered Damarla Chennapa Nayaka twenty lakhs to end the siege fifteen lakhs in gold and the rest in pearls and jewels. Damarla Chennapa Nayaka did not accept the offer instead he wrote to Emperor Venkatapati Raya urging him to come at once saying this was the right moment to claim one of the strongest forts in the region. Venkatapati Raya immediately set out on January 9, 1614 leading a massive army with countless attendants and elephants. When the Emperor arrived at the camp Lingama fell at his feet in surrender. However Lingama’s sons continued firing from inside trying their best to block Venkatapati Raya’s entry into the fort. In the end Vellore Fort was taken and the Emperor and his queen stayed in Lingama’s grand marble palace decorated with gold and precious stones.

== Aftermath ==
Venkatapati Raya stayed in Vellore until the month of May. During this time, he took from Lingama Nayaka a large collection of valuable pearls and precious stones. After securing this wealth, the emperor decided to take Lingama as a prisoner. He brought him from the strong fort of Vellore to Chandragiri.

== See also ==
- Nayaks of Vellore
- Venkatapati Raya
- Battle of Toppur
