= Peda Venkata Raya =

Emperor of Vijayanagara from 1632 to 1642

Emperor of Vijayanagara
- Reign: 1632 – 10 October 1642
- Predecessor: Rama Deva Raya
- Successor: Sriranga III
- Died: 10 October 1642; Chittoor
- Religion: Hinduism

Venkata III (born Pedda Venkata Raya; reigned 1632 – 10 October 1642) was the grandson of Aliya Rama Raya. Venkata III belonged to a Telugu family. and became the King of the Vijayanagara Empire from 1632 to 1642. His son-in-law Pedda Koneti Nayak was ruler of Penukonda. His brothers-in-law were Damarla Venkatappa Nayaka and Damarla Ayyappa Nayaka, both sons of Damarla Chennapa Nayakadu.

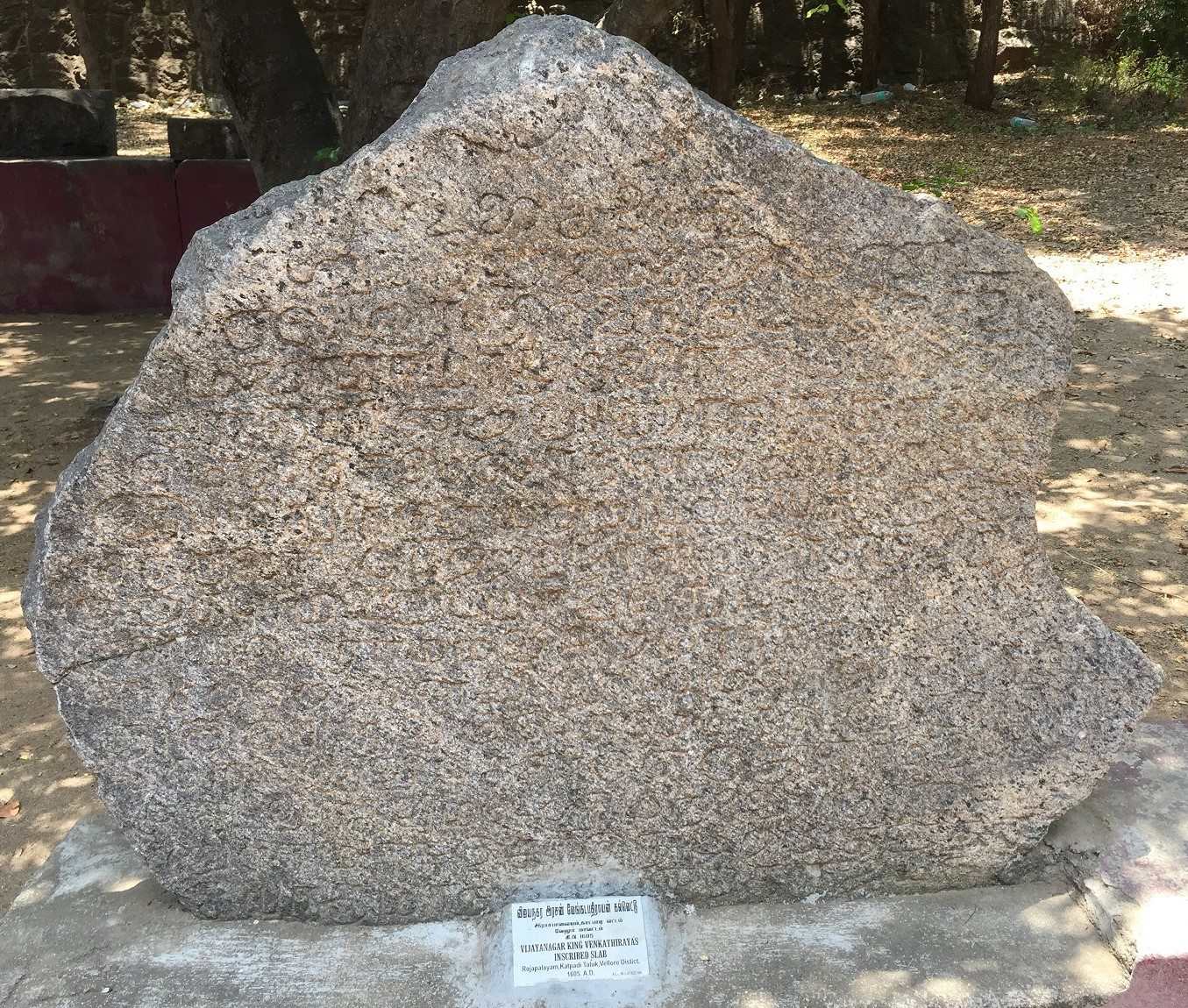
Vijaynagar Venkathiraya Tamil Inscription, 1605 CE, Vellore District, displayed at the ASI Museum, Vellore Fort

== Seizure by Timma Raja ==
His paternal uncle, Timma Raja, another brother of Sriranga II, considering himself to have a better claim, seized the government at Vellore Fort, compelling Venkata III to remain in his native Penukonda. The Nayaks of Gingee, Tanjore and Madurai declared support for Venkata III, while Timma Raja got support from no-one and was looked upon as a usurper.

Timma Raja nevertheless made a lot of trouble and civil strife continued until his death in 1635. Initially he was winning, until the King Pedda Venkata (Venkata III)'s nephew, Sriranga III took to the field and defeated Timma Raja with help from the Dutch in Pulicat, compelling him to accept Venkata III's claim. Timma Raja was allowed some territories under his control, but stirred up trouble for a second time, only to be slain by the Nayak of Gingee in 1635.

Peace was finally restored and Pedda Venkata Raya or Venkata III returned to Vellore to take charge.

== Madras Land Grant ==
On 22 August 1639, Francis Day of the East India Company obtained a small strip of Land in the Coromandel Coast from Pedda Venkata Raya in Chandragiri as a place to build a factory and warehouse for their trading activities. The region was under the control of the Damerla Venkatadri Nayakudu, a Recherla Velama Nayak of Kalahasti and Vandavasi. Venkatadri Nayakudu was son of Damerla Chennappa Nayakudu. This is widely regarded at the founding event of the formation of the Chennai (Madras) Metropolis and is to the day celebrated as Madras Day.

== Trouble from Southern Nayaks ==
In 1637 the Nayaks of Tanjore and Madurai, out of some complications attempted to seize Venkata III and attacked Vellore but were defeated and peace was established.

== Sriranga III's rebellion ==
The King's loyal nephew, Sriranga III, for some reason turned against the King in 1638 and engineered an invasion from Bijapur. The Bijapur – Sriranga III combine initially attacked Bangalore making the King Venkata III buy peace after an expensive deal. In 1641, the same combine launched another attack and were just 12 miles (19 km) from Vellore Fort, but their camp was attacked with backing by Southern Nayaka famous general Ramaiyan.

== War with Golkonda and death ==
In 1642, the Qutb Shahi dynasty of Golconda watching the disorder, sent a huge force along the East Coast. The Golkonda army, after facing a stiff resistance near Madras by Venkata III's army backed by Damerla Venkatadri Nayak of Kalahasti and the Gingee Nayak, marched towards the Vellore Fort. But Venkata III, now badly under threat from all sides retreated to the jungles of Chittoor and died on 10 October 1642.

Venkata III had no son and was immediately succeeded by his treacherous nephew Sriranga III, who came to Vellore Fort after deserting the Bijapur camp.

Preceded by Ramadeva	Vijayanagar Empire; 1632–1642	Succeeded by Sriranga III
