= Battle of Gingee (1608) =

- Part of Vijayanagara Campaigns In South
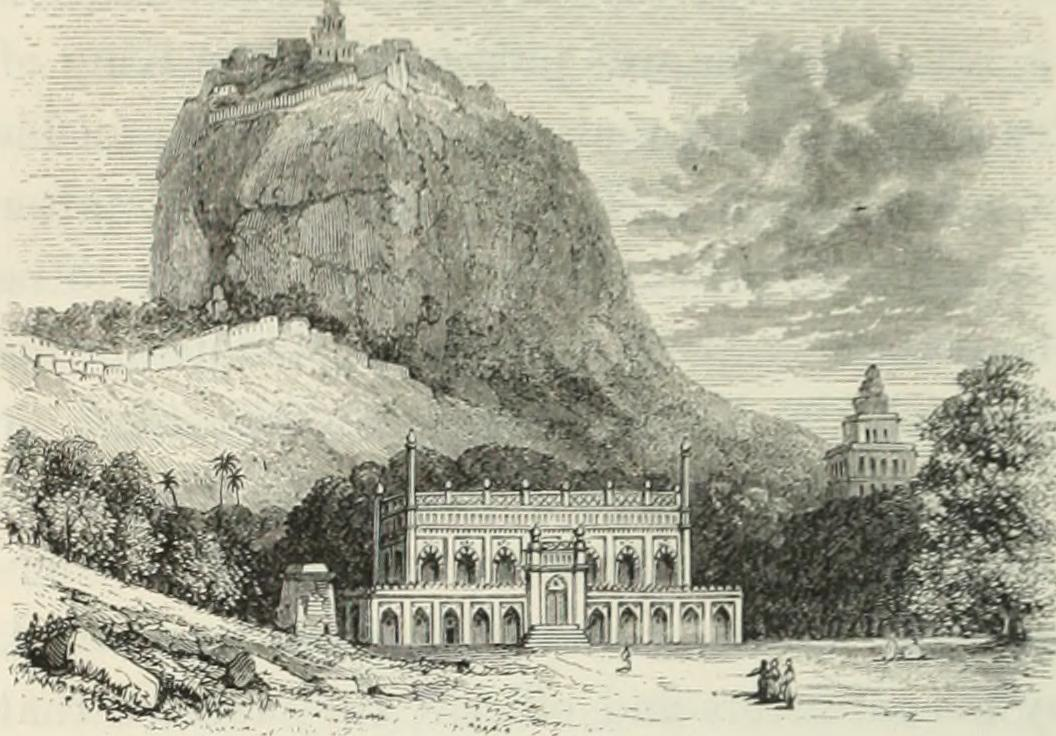
- Painting of Gingee Fort
Date	January 1608
Location	Gingee, India
Result	Vijayanagar victory
Territorial changes	Ganaripatao Fort ceded to Venkatapati Raya

Belligerents
Vijayanagar Empire: Venkatagiri estate	Gingee Nayaks

Commanders and leaders
Venkatapati Raya; Velugoti Yachama Nayaka	Krishnappa Nayaka (POW)

The Battle of Gingee was a conflict between the forces of the Vijayanagara Empire and the army of Krishnappa Nayaka the ruler of Gingee. Under the leadership of Velugoti Yachama Nayaka the Vijayanagara army marched toward the strong fort of Gingee. Instead of defending himself inside the fort Krishnappa came out to fight in open battle His army was defeated he was taken prisoner and the fort of Gingee fell in January 1608.

== Background ==
After the conquest of Vellore According to Father Coutinho in A.D. 1609 many nobles and courtiers around Emperor Venkatapati Raya were strongly urging him to march towards Gingee. They felt it was important because Gingee was a very strong and strategic fort and controlling it would help secure the region and protect the Vijayanagara Empire.

Velugoti Yachama Nayaka led the imperial army against Gingee after its ruler Krishnappa Nayaka refused to pay tribute to the Vijayanagara emperor. This became the main reason for the campaign especially after the earlier conflict at Vellore where Venkatapati Raya had already taken action against Lingama Nayaka for the same issue. Gingee was a well defended fort and Krishnappa believed his strong army and fortress would protect him. Historical accounts also note that the emperor prepared his forces to deal firmly with both Vellore and Gingee to restore control in the region.

Fr. Coutinho records that there was a rumour saying four nobles of Krishnappa had poisoned him which led to a period of confusion in Gingee. When this news reached the court of Venkatapati Raya some courtiers advised the emperor to use the situation to take action against Gingee. However Venkatapati Raya refused saying that it would be cruel to wage war against a feudatory who was believed to be unwell. Later Krishnappa recovered and punished the nobles involved in the incident. For a time Gingee avoided conflict and Krishnappa appeared to renew his loyalty to the empire. According to Fr. Coutinho in 1604 Krishnappa even sent an embassy to Venkatapati Raya.

However the loyalty shown by Krishnappa did not last long. After a short period of peace he again refused to pay tribute to the Vijayanagara Empire. This led the emperor to take military action against Gingee.

== Battle ==
Velugoti Yachama Nayaka led the Vijayanagara army and marched towards Gingee. If Krishnappa had stayed inside the strong fort Yachama would have faced a much harder battle. But because of his confidence the Krishnappa Nayak of Gingee came out with his army to face the Vijayanagara forces in open battle. He was defeated taken prisoner and Gingee fell in January 1608. After the victory Emperor Venkatapati Raya came from Vellore to Gingee where the captured Krishnappa bowed before him and asked for mercy.

== Aftermath ==
Through the influence of one of the queens of Venkatapati Raya Krishnappa was able to save his life by paying a large ransom of 600,000 cruzados and by giving up the fortress of Ganaripattam near Gingee. Historical records mention that after his defeat he became deeply discouraged and later with the support of the Nayaks of Madurai and Tanjore efforts were made to restore his position. Raghunatha Nayaka of Tanjore played an important role in securing Krishnappa's release from prison and helping him regain his title as the Nayak of Gingee. historians like Mr. Virudhagiresan state that certain claims such as Raghunatha Nayaka marrying a princess of Gingee are not supported by evidence.

== See also ==
- Siege of Vellore (1603–1604)
- Venkatapati Raya
- Gingee Nayaks
