= Battle of Vellore =

- Part of Deccani–Vijayanagar wars
Date	4 April, 1646
Location	Vellore, Tamilnadu, India 12.9215°N 79.1316°E
Result	Bijapur victory

Belligerents
Vijayanagar Empire: Kalahasti Nayaks	Bijapur Sultanate

Commanders and leaders
Sriranga III; Damarla Venkata (WIA); Raghu Brahman; Bahlol Khan; Dilawar Khan	Mustafa Khan; Shahaji; Asad Khan (WIA); Siddi Raihan; Tembaji Saheb
- Location within South Asia

The Battle of Vellore (1646) was a military conflict fought on 4 April 1646 between the armies of the Vijayanagara Empire and the Bijapur Sultanate near Vellore. After advancing into the Carnatic and capturing several important forts, the Bijapur army under Mustafa Khan was met by the forces of Sriranga III outside Vellore. The battle ended in a Bijapur victory and was followed by the siege of Vellore which compelled Sriranga III to accept a peace settlement.

== Background ==
After the Battle of Masti, Sriranga III unable to continue the war alone retreated to Vellore. Jagadeva Rao sent his women and children to the safety of his capital at Virabhadradurgam before withdrawing to Krishnagiri. Although he offered determined resistance his territory was eventually overrun and several of his important forts were captured by the Bijapur forces.

Despite his military successes, Mustafa Khan sought to negotiate peace with Sriranga III and bring the war to an end. The outbreak of a famine had made the continuation of the conflict increasingly difficult. Mustafa Khan sent peace proposals to Sriranga but the latter acting on the advice of Bahlol Khan and Damerla Venkata delayed his response. Their strategy was to prevent the Nayak rulers from joining forces with the Golconda Sultanate and instead persuade them to support Vijayanagara. Although peace with Mustafa Khan was ultimately considered desirable they believed the war should continue until this objective had been achieved.

After receiving no satisfactory response from Sriranga III, Mustafa Khan resumed his advance towards Vellore. On the way he captured the strongly fortified forts of Gudiyatham, which was regarded as nearly impregnable and Virinchipuram on the banks of the Palar River. He then advanced to within three miles of Vellore.

== Battle ==
Meanwhile, the Nayak rulers adopted a more conciliatory stance towards Sriranga III and pledged their support. The rulers of Mysore and Kangundi apologized for their earlier desertion while the Nayak of Madurai urged the Nayak of Thanjavur to support Sriranga III's cause. Together, they promised to provide forty thousand troops and sixty thousand pardaus for the defence of the kingdom. Sriranga III dispatched Naranappa and several other nobles to finalize the alliance with the Nayaks. However, before the promised reinforcements could arrive he was forced to engage the Bijapur Army in battle.

=== Army Positions ===
Damerla Venkata commanded the centre of Vijayanagara army where he faced Mustafa Khan, who led the centre of the Bijapur Army. On the right and left wings Bahlol Khan and Dilawar Khan two Muslim officers in Sriranga III's service, were positioned opposite of Siddi Raihan and Shahaji Bhonsle.

=== Battle ===
A major battle was fought near Vellore on 4th April 1646. During the engagement, the Vijayanagara Army right and left wings, commanded by Bahlol Khan and Dilawar Khan were defeated forcing many of their troops to retreat into the fort at Vellore. In the centre, however Damerla Venkata continued to resist and launched a counterattack against the forces of Shahaji Bhonsle. During the fighting, the Bijapur general Asad Khan was wounded and unhorsed, and parts of the Bijapur army briefly fell back before being rallied by Malik Raihan.

Damerla Venkata mounted on an elephant advanced towards Mustafa Khan's position closely pursued by Malik Raihan. According to the Muhammad Namah Mustafa Khan considered dismounting from his elephant but was persuaded to remain mounted by the Maratha commander Tembaji Saheb. The forces of Damerla Venkata and Malik Raihan then engaged in a fierce clash.

The battle ended in a Bijapur victory with the Vijayanagara army suffering heavy losses and dispersing from the battlefield. The Muhammad Namah states that approximately five thousand eight hundred soldiers were killed. It also records that Damerla Venkata was wounded by an arrow fired by Mustafa Khan before withdrawing with the remaining Vijayanagara Army.

== Aftermath ==
After the battle, the Bijapur army laid siege to Vellore Fort. Following a period of resistance, Sriranga III agreed to terms undertaking to pay an indemnity of 50 lakh huns and surrender 150 elephants. Hostilities were then temporarily suspended.

Mustafa Khan left Shahaji Bhonsle and Asad Khan in charge of the newly conquered Carnatic before returning to Bijapur with substantial war booty and valuable gifts. According to contemporary accounts, he was received with great honour by the Bijapur Sultan Mohammad Adil Shahwho advanced as far as the Krishna River to welcome his victorious chief minister.

== See also ==
- Madurai Nayakas
- Raghunatha Nayaka
- Deva Raya II
