= Battle of Pennar =

Battle between the Vijayanagar Empire and Golconda Sultanate

- Part of Deccani–Vijayanagar wars
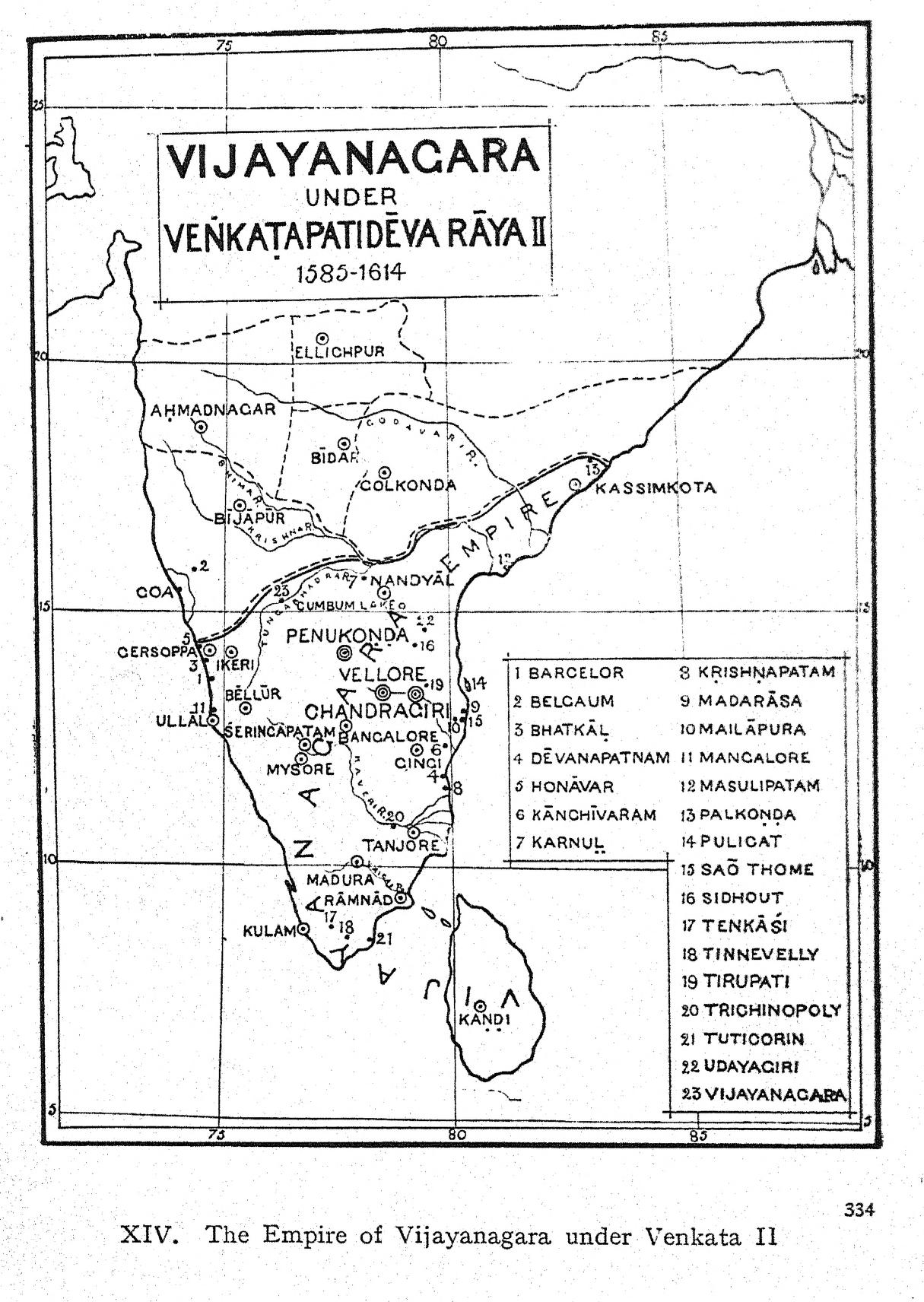
- Vijayanagara Empire under Venkatapati Raya
Date	Unknown
Location	Pennar River, Andhra Pradesh, India
Result	Vijayanagar victory
Territorial changes	Sultan Muhammad Quli Qutub Shah recognised the Krishna River as the boundary between Golconda Sultanate and Vijayanagara Empire

Belligerents
Vijayanagar Empire; Supported by: Vijayanagara Vassals: Venkatagiri estate	Golconda Sultanate

Commanders and leaders
Venkatapati Raya; Velugoti Yachama Nayaka; Velugoti Chennapa; Yara Timmaraju; Manuparaju; Gulrang Setty	Murtaza Khan; Rustum Khan

Strength
100,000	

Casualties and losses
Unknown	50,000 Killed

The Battle of Pennar was a major battle between the Vijayanagara Empire and the Golconda Sultanate. Both sides camped near the Pennar River waiting for the right moment to attack. During this tense situation sudden confusion broke out in the Golconda camp and the Vijayanagara Army quickly took advantage of it. A fierce battle followed and the Golconda forces were defeated. Many of their soldiers fled leaving behind weapons, supplies, and important royal items.

== Background ==
A large Vijayanagara Army of nearly one lakh soldiers, led by Yara Timmaraja, Gulranga Setty, Manuparaju, Velugoti Cennapa, and Velugoti Yachama Nayaka marched toward Gandikota to capture the fort. To divert their attention Murtaza Khan suddenly attacked Cuddapah and destroyed a local temple. When Venkata heard of this he sent Yara Timmaraja and Manuparaju with ten thousand cavalry to stop him. They met Murtaza Khan near Cuddapah but their forces were defeated and forced to retreat. Despite this victory for Murtaza Khan it did nothing to ease the pressure on the Golconda garrison still trapped inside Gandikota.

When Muhammad Quli Qutb Shah learned how serious the situation had become for his army he quickly organized help. He placed five thousand cavalry under Rustam Khan and sent him south with full authority to support Murtaza Khan. When Rustam Khan arrived he immediately took over the entire command of the army. However instead of cooperating he paid little attention to Murtaza Khan’s advice and showed no interest in following his plans.

== Battle ==
Rustum Khan crossed the Pennar River with his army and set up camp on the other side. The ground there was black cotton soil soft and slippery because of the recent rain.

Both armies set up their camps on opposite banks of the Pennar River watching each other closely. a decorated bull from the Vijayanagara side suddenly ran into the Golconda camp. Rustum Khan startled by the unexpected sight rode to the back of his camp and this sudden move threw his soldiers into confusion. The Vijayanagara Army already surrounding the area quickly took advantage of the panic. The Golconda troops began to fall apart and were cut down in large numbers. It was only the bravery of Murtaza Khan the former commander that saved many of them as he fought fiercely to hold off the attackers and help his men escape. The defeat was severe Vijayanagara Army captured the enemy’s equipment including the royal umbrella and the fleeing soldiers were chased all the way back toward Golconda.

== Aftermath ==
Velugoti Cennapa who had fought bravely in the Battle led the Vijayanagara Army towards Gandikota with his cousin Velugoti Yachama Nayaka supporting him. They reached the fort and captured it. Once Gandikota fell, the smaller forts nearby also surrendered the Golconda soldiers who remained were driven back across the Krishna River. In the end Sultan Muhammad Quli Qutub Shah had to accept the Krishna River as the border between his kingdom and the Vijayanagara Empire.

== See also ==
- Muhammad Quli Qutub Shah
- Venkatapati Raya
- Siege of Penukonda
