= Battle of Vemgallu =

- Part of Deccani–Vijayanagar wars
Date	21 August, 1644
Location	Vemgallu, India
Result	Vijayanagar victory

Belligerents
Vijayanagar Empire; Supported by: Vijayanagara Vassals: Velugoti Nayaks	Golconda Sultanate

Commanders and leaders
Sriranga III; Velugoti Singa; Kistappa Nayaka	Abdullah Qutub Shah; Ghazi Ali †; Sayyid Muzaffar †; Ghazanfar Khan †

Casualties and losses
Moderate	Heavy

The Battle of Vemgallu was a military conflict fought on 21 August, 1644 near the Vemgallu tank between the forces of the Vijayanagara Empire, led by Kistappa Nayak and Velugoti Singa and the Golconda Sultanate under Ghazi Ali. The Vijayanagara army decisively defeated the invading Golconda forces killing Ghazi Ali, his son, and two senior commanders. The victory halted the Golconda Army advance, forced its army to retreat beyond Kadanukur and reversed Mir Jumla II's recent territorial gains in the region.

== Background ==
After defeating the Golconda army at Udayagiri, Sriranga III believed he was strong enough to reassert his authority over the Nayaks. He reminded the Nayaks of Gingee, Thanjavur, and Madurai that they remained his vassals and collected large sums of money from them. Part of this revenue was paid to the Sultan of Bijapur in return for military support against Golconda. However, the Nayaks of Madurai and Gingee soon resumed their independent policies. Backed by Bijapur, Sriranga III then launched a campaign to capture the town of Arani from the Nayak of Gingee.

== Battle ==
In the year 1644 a second Golconda invasion under the command of Ghazi Ali Accompanied by Saiyyad Muzaffar and Shah Ghazanfar Khan son-in-law of Rustum-i-Zaman of Bijapur disrupted the peace of the Vijayanagara Empire. Facing little resistance, the Golconda army advanced rapidly to Pulicat and attempted to capture the town. The assault was repelled by the Dutch garrison under Commander Henssen.

At the same time, the Nayak of Gingee angered by Sriranga III's earlier attempt to seize Arani, sought an alliance with Golconda and planned to attack the Vijayanagara Army from the rear. In response, Sriranga III sent an embassy to Gingee to secure the Nayak's support. While awaiting the opinions of the Nayaks of Madurai and Thanjavur the Gingee ruler agreed to delay sending troops giving Sriranga III valuable time to strengthen his position.

Sriranga III also worked to reconcile with Gingee by recalling the general Kistappa Nayak from operations against the Gingee Nayak and restoring Chinnana (Mallaiya) to power. Soon afterward, Kistappa Nayak and Velugoti Singa intercepted the Golconda army near the Vemgallu tank on 21 August 1644. In the ensuing battle the Vijayanagara forces won a decisive victory.

Ghazi Ali, the Golconda commander, his son, and two senior officers were killed in the fighting. The defeated Golconda army retreated in disorder and was pursued by the Vijayanagara Army beyond Kandukur in present-day Nellore district. The defeat reversed Mir Jumla's recent gains in the region and restored Vijayanagara Empire control over much of the contested territory.

== Aftermath ==
Sriranga III's victory was short-lived. The Sultan of Golconda soon secured military support from the Sultanate of Bijapur and the combined armies of Golconda and Bijapur advanced to the frontiers of the Vijayanagara Empire.

== See also ==
- Mughal Empire
- Shah Jahan
- Shahaji
