= Gobburi Jagga Raya =

De facto Emperor of Vijayanagara from 1615 to 1617

Jagga Raya

Vijayanagara Emperor (de facto)
- Reign: February 1615 – 1617
- Predecessor: Sriranga II
- Successor: Rama Deva Raya
- Died: 1617; Toppur, Vijayanagara Empire
- Dynasty: Aravidu

Gobburi Jagga Raya (reigned February 1615 – 1617) was a de facto Emperor of Vijayanagara on behalf of his adopted nephew named Chenga Raya, a rival claimant to the Vijaynagara thorne. He was the brother of Venkata II's favourite queen Obayamma who was bequeathed the Pulicat region and belonged to the Gobburi family of Nayaks under the Vijayanagar Empire.

== Reign ==
In 1614, after the death of Venkata II, Jagga Raya murdered Sriranga II the succeeding King and his family, but Rama Deva Raya, Sriranga II's son escape from Vellore. The murder of the royal family created shock and horror throughout the kingdom, forming hatred of Jagga Raya and his group.

Thus many nobles and chieftains deserted Jagga Raya's faction and joined Rama Deva Raya's camp, which backed a legal royal claimant. He received help from the Nayaks of Gingee and Madurai, both eager to get out of the Vijayanagara bond, to attack Rama Deva and his alliance.

=== Battle of Toppur ===
Jagga Raya and his allies, the Nayaks of Madurai, Nayaks of Gingee, Chera ruler and Portuguese from the coast assembled a large army near Tiruchirapalli. Both the Armies met at the Toppur, at an open field on the northern banks of River Cauvery, between Tiruchirapalli and Grand Anicut in late 1616.

In the Battle Jagga Raya's troops could not withstand the aggression generated by the imperial forces. Yachama Nayakadu, the Nayak of Kalahasti and Raghunatha Nayaka, the generals of the imperial camp led their forces with great discipline. Jagga Raya was slain by Yachama, and his army was broken in the ranks which subsequently took flight by early 1617.
