= Battle of Toppur =

1616–1617 battle in India

| Date | 12 December 1616 – early 1617 |
| Location | Toppur, Vijayanagara Empire |
| Result | Raghunatha Nayak's faction's victory: Rama Deva Raya crowned as Emperor of Vijayanagara |

Belligerents
| Jagga Raya's faction | Raghunatha Nayak's faction |

Commanders and leaders
| Jagga Raya † | Raghunatha Nayak; Rama Deva Raya; Yachama Naidu |

Casualties and losses
| Heavy | Heavy |

The Battle of Toppur took place in late 1616 between the de facto Vijayanagara emperor Jagga Raya, and Rama Deva Raya. This battle caused devastation to the already declining Vijayanagara Empire. It was a civil war fought by the claimants for the throne of the Vijayanagara Empire. Jagga Raya challenged the Sriranga authority on behalf of his nephew.

== Background ==
Venkatapati Raya, the ruler of the Vijayanagara Empire who belonged to the Aravidu dynasty, died without direct heirs. So he declared his nephew Sriranga II as heir. But Venkatapati's queen Bayamma had adopted a Brahmin boy named Chenga Raya as her son to succeed him to the throne. Her ambition caused a civil war in the empire. Bayamma's brother Gobburi Jagga Raya kidnapped and murdered the king and his whole family. Only his one son survived. This brutal murder caused anger in Royal court and among other nayak commanders. The commander of Imperial army Velugoti Yachama Nayaka revolted and supported the son of Sriranga II named Rama Deva Raya.

== Location ==
The location of the battle that took place is mentioned as Toppur by most historians, located on the banks of Cauvery river a mile of Grand Anicut, which is present day Thogur.

== Battle ==
Upon knowing from his sources that Rama Deva Raya was stationed in Kumbakonam, Jagga Raya wanted to eliminate him. He got the support of Gingee and Madurai rulers by making them believe that he has the legitimacy to decide the next King. He rallied towards Kumbakonam with his allies. With this new development, Ragunatha Nayaka rushed towards Kumbakonam to save the future King. He halted for the night at Palamaneri enroute.

The following day in the Year of Nala on Ashada Suddha Panchami, Raghunatha Nayaka with the support of Yachama Nayaka faced the armies of Verappa Nayaka (Madurai Kingdom), Jagga Raya and Varadappa Nayaka (Gingee Kingdom).

Early in the morning, on the battle field, Ragunatha ordered his cannons to be fired, to which the Madurai cannons responded in kind. As the cannons got heated up operating for more than 90 minutes, they halted. Considerable lives were lost on both the sides. Raghunatha commanded his cavalry that was sneakily hidden behind his infantry lines to attack the enemy. This resulted in a panic in the enemy lines and Verappa Nayaka along with his commanders withdrew from the battle field. The infantry of Madurai was encircled and slaughtered mercilessly. In second wave, infantry of Thanjavur replaced the retreating cavalry of Thanjavur to which the Madurai infantry fled.

Later Jagga Raya with his army entered the battle field roaring. Raghunatha Nayaka upon seeing the battle flag of Jagga, got agitated and advanced on his elephant. He ordered for a barrage of arrows onto his enemy. To fulfil the oath of his king to kill Jagga, one of the knights of Thanjavur, shot a spear towards Jagga with all his might. It pierced the armour of Jagga and resulted in his death. Armies of Jagga completely fled the battle.

Verappa then entered the battle field along with the armies of Gingee. To relieve the Thanjavur armies, Yachama entered the field along with his armies. He scattered both the Madurai and Gingee armies. The enemy forces withdrew from the battle once and for all. This resulted in the resounding victory of Raghunatha Nayaka and Yachama Nayaka towards the evening.

== Aftermath ==
The battle was won by the Raghunatha Nayak faction and Yachama Naidu, Rama Deva Raya, son of Sriranga II, who was only 13 years old and was crowned as Emperor.

It was the battle which caused the complete disintegration of the Vijayanagar Empire, which was reviving slowly. This civil war caused severe problems to the Vijayanagara Empire.

== Sources ==
- Rao, V. N. Hari. "Thiruvarangam - History". History Of Srirangam Temple. Archived from the original on 30 September 2007 – via thiruvarangam.com.
- Rao, Velcheru Narayana, and David Shulman, Sanjay Subrahmanyam. Symbols of substance : court and state in Nayaka period Tamilnadu (Delhi; Oxford : Oxford University Press, 1998); xix, 349 p., [16] p. of plates : ill., maps; 22 cm.; Oxford India paperbacks; Includes bibliographical references and index; ISBN 0-19-564399-2.
- Sathianathaier, R. History of the Nayaks of Madura [microform] by R. Sathyanatha Aiyar; edited for the University, with introduction and notes by S. Krishnaswami Aiyangar ([Madras] : Oxford University Press, 1924); see also ([London] : H. Milford, Oxford university press, 1924); xvi, 403 p.; 21 cm.; SAMP early 20th-century Indian books project item 10819.
- K.A. Nilakanta Sastry, History of South India, From Prehistoric times to fall of Vijayanagar, 1955, OUP, (Reprinted 2002) ISBN 0-19-560686-8.
- Vriddhagirisan, V. (1942). The Nayaks of Tanjore. Annamalai University.
