= Guindy Race Course =

Horse racing venue in Chennai, India

- Interactive map of Guindy Race Course
- Location: Guindy, Chennai
- Coordinates: 13.005°N 80.216°E
- Owned by: Madras Race Club
- Date opened: 1777

The Guindy Race Course is a horse racing course set up in 1777 in Chennai, India. It is the oldest race course in India. It hosts events in the winter season.

== History ==
In 1777, 81 cawnies (1 cawni = 57,499 sq. ft.) of land were granted by the government to conduct races, which is mentioned in a letter written by the then Collector of Chingleput dated 22 June 1825. The land was taken from the Adyar villages of Venkatapuram and Velachery. Soon after racing had begun in the 1770s, it became irregular and almost stopped due to the invasion of Hyder Ali, who came within striking distance of Madras. A few years later, 35 cawnies were added and two race courses came up—a smaller one to train horses and the other with a stand to watch the races.

=== Madras Race Club ===
The Madras Race Club was officially constituted in 1837. The club functioned till 1875, when the Prince of Wales Edward VII visited Madras. Racing again went through a tough phase owing to financial reasons. Finally, in 1887, the club was revived. A balance of 11 rupees, 13 annas and 12 paise was carried forward to a new club called Madras Race Club with 50 members in January 1896. In 1887, a public meeting was called by Lt. Col. G. M. Moore, one of the stewards and it was presided over by the governor. New stewards were appointed at this meeting to run the club. The funds managed by the stewards of the Madras races were handed over to the club. The Trades Cup formed part of the racing programme proving that the traders patronised racing.

Racing continued in the 1900s although on a low key. It was brought to a temporary halt by World War I till Lord Willingdon, the then governor of Madras, revived it in 1919. In 1920, a stand was constructed with funds provided by two patrons, Maharaja of Bobbili and Maharaja of Venkatagiri. In 1931, the Guindy Lodge was built in the club premises for the secretary, and in 1933, the weighing room was constructed. Till 1952–1953, the Madras Race Club was under the Calcutta Turf Club after which it came, like all race courses in the south, under the South India Turf Club. Classic races were introduced in 1958–1959. In 1966, the Madras Race Club became an independent turf authority. Soon, as each one gained a separate status, the South India Turf Club became redundant.

== The club today ==
The club now has about 625 horses in station, three stands and boasts of the best race track in the country. The racing season begins in November and goes on till March after which races are conducted in Ooty between April and June. A monsoon season has been introduced with races being conducted between August and October. All race clubs in India followed their own racing rules till G. Jayaraman, the Manager of Madras Race Club, harmonised the racing rules of all the race clubs of India by 1993.
