= Pedda Koneti Nayak =

Pedda Koneti Nayak was a governor of Penukonda under the Vijayanagar Empire who later proclaimed his independence and founded the Penukonda Nayak kingdom. He reigned from 1635 to 1652.He ruled Penukonda, Rayadurgam and Kundurpi Forts.

== Ancestry and personal life ==
He was the son of Kasturi Nayaka and his grand father Akkapa Nayak had enjoyed high favour with the fallen kings of Vijayanagar who were ruling at Chandragiri. He hailed from the Vasarasi family of Balija caste. He married uddlamba, the daughter of Vijayanagara king Peda Venkata Raya.

== Reign ==
Koneti Nayaka impressed Venkata III with his valour and obtained Penugonda as a Chief. Some years afterwards the Bijapur king took Penukonda, but left Pedda Koneti Nayak in possession of Kundurpi Drug on condition that he paid tribute and rendered military service. Koneti Nayak, then, turned out Bommalla, its tyrannical ruler and established his supremacy over it and reigned at Rayadurgam in his stead.
