= Chennuru =

Chennuru or Chennur may refer to several places in India:

== Andhra Pradesh ==
- Chennur, Kadapa district
- Chennur, Nellore district

== Telangana ==
- Chennuru, Khammam district
- Chennur, Mancherial district
  - Chennur Assembly constituency
- Chennur, Wanaparthy district, in Gopalpeta mandal
