= Kocherlakota =

Kocherlakota or Kocharlakota (Telugu: కోచర్లకోట) is a Telugu surname. Notable people with the surname include:

- Kocherlakota Narayana, American economist and president of the Federal Reserve Bank of Minneapolis
- Kotcherlakota Rangadhama Rao (1898–1972), Indian physicist
- Koccharlakota Satyanarayana (1915–1969), Telugu film actor and playback singer
