= Padaiveedu =

- Town panchayat
- Location in Tamil Nadu, India
- Coordinates: 11°26′55″N 77°48′59″E
- Country: India
- State: Tamil Nadu
- District: Namakkal

Area
  - Total: 14.45 km^{2} (5.58 sq mi)

Population (2011)
  - Total: 10,451
  - Density: 723.3/km^{2} (1,873/sq mi)

Languages
  - Official: Tamil
- Time zone: UTC+5:30 (IST)
- Postal code: 637303

Padaiveedu, also spelt Padaveedu, is a panchayat town in Komarapalayam taluk of Namakkal district in the Indian state of Tamil Nadu. Spread across an area of 14.45 km^{2} (5.58 sq mi), the town panchayat is divided into 15 wards. It had a population of 10,451 as per the 2011 census.

== Geography and administration ==
Padaiveedu (also spelt Padaveedu) is a town panchayat in Komarapalayam taluk of Namakkal district in the Indian state of Tamil Nadu. The town panchayat covers an area of 14.45 km^{2} (5.58 sq mi) and is divided into 15 wards and 40 streets. The panchayat administration is responsible for providing basic services including maintenance of roads, water supply, health and sanitation. Padaiveedu forms part of the Kumarapalayam Assembly constituency of the Tamil Nadu Legislative Assembly and the Erode Lok Sabha constituency.

== Demographics ==
According to the 2011 census, Padaiveedu had a population of 10,451 across 2,965 households. The population consisted of 5,238 males and 5,213 females. About 914 (8.75%) of the population were children aged less than six years. The town panchayat had a literacy rate of approximately 69.8%. Scheduled Castes accounted for approximately 34.9% of the population.

As per the 2011 census, Hinduism was the predominant religion, practiced by 98.7% of the population, followed by Christianity (1.1%) and Islam (0.2%). The town panchayat has two temples–Athanur Amman Temple and Karikalliyamman Temple, located in wards 15 and 13 respectively. The annual temple festival is celebrated in March.

== Transport ==
Padaiveedu is situated along the Sangagiri–Bhavani main road, approximately 18 km (11 mi) from Bhavani. In 2026, the National Highways Authority of India proposed to upgrade the road to a new national highway designated as NH-381A at a cost of ₹2 billion (US$21 million). The road will connect the existing national highways NH-81 and NH-544. However, farmers at Padaiveedu are opposed to the project due to the fear of loss of agricultural lands required for the expansion of the road. It is located approximately 40 km (25 mi) from Salem, and 48 km (30 mi) from Namakkal. Public bus services connect the town with nearby urban centres, including Sankari, Bhavani, Tiruchengode, Erode and Salem. The nearest railway station is the Sankari Durg railway station located approximately 6 km (3.7 mi) away. The nearest major railhead is the Erode Junction railway station, approximately 20 km (12 mi) away.
