= Rama Deva Raya =

Emperor of Vijayanagara from 1617 to 1632

Emperor of Vijayanagara
- Reign: 1617–1632
- Predecessor: Jagga Raya (de facto)
- Successor: Venkata III
- Died: 1632
- Religion: Hinduism

Rama Deva Raya (or Vira Rama Deva Raya; reigned 1617–1632) ascended the throne after a gruesome war in 1617 as the Emperor of Vijaynagara. In 1614, his father Sriranga II, who was the preceding emperor, and his family were murdered by rival factions headed by Jagga Raya, who was one of their kins. Rama Deva himself was smuggled out of the prison by Yachama Naidu, a faithful commander and the viceroy of earlier emperor Venkata II.

== Civil War ==
Jagga Raya made a claim of a putative son of Venkata II's queens as the King, which was strongly challenged by Yachama Naidu, the leading general in the imperial army and the Nayak of Kalahasti, who claimed the throne for Rama Deva, the rightful heir. In a long-drawn battle between the two factions in which the whole of the kingdom took part, Jagga Raya would be slain and his Gobburi estates in south west of Nellore in present-day Chennai, Chengelpet seized by Yachama Naidu.

== Battle of Toppur ==
The defeated Jagga Raya sought refuge in the jungle but bounced back and sought help from the Nayaks of Gingee and Madurai, both eager to get out of the Vijayanagara bond, to attack Yachama Naidu and Rama Deva. Yachama Naidu and Ramadeva sought support from the Tanjore Nayaks, who still treated the Vijayanagar as their authority.

=== Armies ===
Jagga Raya and his allies, the Nayaks of Madurai, Gingee and Chera ruler, chieftains of Madurai, and some Portuguese from the coast assembled a large army near Tiruchirapalli. Yachama led his forces from Vellore and was joined in midway by Tanjore forces headed by the Tanjore King Raghunatha Nayaka. Yachama – Tanjore forces were further strengthened by nobles from Karnataka and (according to some accounts) Dutch and Jaffna armies.

Both the Armies met at the Toppur, at an open field on the northern banks of River Cauvery, between Tiruchirapalli and Grand Anicut in late months of 1616.

=== Result ===
In the Battle Jagga Raya's troops could not withstand the aggression generated by the imperial forces led by Yachama and Raghunatha, the generals of the Imperial camp. Jagga Raya was slain by Yachama, and his army took flight. Yethiraja, the brother of Jagga Raya, had to run for his life. The Nayaka chieftain of Madurai tried to escape, he was pursued by Yachama's general Rao Dama Nayani and captured near Tiruchirapalli. The Nayak of Gingee in the encounter lost all his forts except Gingee Fort and the putative son of Venkata II, the cause of all the trouble, was captured. The victory was celebrated by the imperial armies headed by Thanjavur Nayak and Yachamanedu, who planted pillars of victory and crowned Rama Deva as Rama Deva Raya, in early months of 1617. Rama Deva Raya was barely 15 years old when he ascended the throne.

== Continued Hostilities ==
Yethiraja, the brother of Jagga Raya, after losing the Toppur Battle, aligned with the Gingee Nayak and attacked Tanjore, but was defeated with the later ending as captive. Yethiraja waged on, until he reconciled with Rama Deva Raya, after giving his daughter in marriage. Things settled for the king after the death of the putative son in 1619.

=== Loss of Kurnool ===
The Bijapur Sultan, taking advantage of the ravaging civil wars attacked Kurnool in 1620, but was defeated and sent back only to return in 1624 and taking that region completely.

=== Yachama ===
Yachama Naidu, now the military governor of the kingdom opposed the marriage of Rama Deva to Yethiraja's daughter. The king was reprimanded but he went on to marry the daughter of Yethiraja. Yachama felt the humiliation and requested Rama Deva to remove him from the royal service with the pretext of age. Yethiraja, now father-in-law of Rama Deva Raya broke into a conflict with Yachama when he demanded the Gobburi lands, and by 1629 with help from Tanjore and Gingee forces, Yachama's territories were attacked by the imperial army. Yachama's forces though inferior in number, put up a stiff fight. After a prolonged siege, Yachama agreed to return the Gobburi lands to Yethiraja. The regions of Pulicat, Chengalpattu and Maduranthakam was completely brought under control of Vellore. Yachama was allowed to rule Venkatagiri but he chose to spend his life in the protection of Udaiyarpalaiyam chieftain.

== Successor ==
Rama Deva Raya, with no brothers and sons nominated Peda Venkata Raya (Venkata III), grandson of Aliya Rama Raya, now governing Anekonda as successor and died on 1632, aged 30 after a troublesome rule of 15 years.

Preceded by Sriranga II	Vijayanagar empire 1617–1632	Succeeded by Venkata III
