= Damarla Chennapa Nayaka =

Nayaka ruler of Kalahasti and Vandavasi from 1585 to 1614

- Died: 1580
- Spouse: Akkamamba
- Children: Damarla Ayyappa Nayak; Venkatadri Nayaka

Damarla Chennapa Nayaka, (Note: The last name is also found written as Nayakudu, Nayudu, or Nayakkar, depending on the language and orientation of the writers. The first name (which is a family name) is also written as Damal, a simplified form.) was a 16th-century Nayaka chieftain and military commander (Dalavoy) who ruled the territories of Kalahasti and Vandavasi under the suzerainty of Vijayanagar emperor Venkatapati Raya (r. 1585–1614). The Kalahasti Nayaks had their origins in the Velama clans of Andhra Pradesh.

The city of Chennai (originally called "Chennapatnam") was founded by his son Damarla Ayyappa Nayaka, and named after him. It was established in order to separate the warring Europeans within the region, the Dutch based at Pulicat and the Portuguese based at Mylapore. To facilitate trade and regional stability, the Nayaka brothers leased a strip of land to the British East India Company, who subsequently set up Fort St. George. Over time, the settlement around the fort and the adjacent town of Chennapatnam merged to form the modern day city. (Note: The city was known by the name "Madras" during the British rule and also after Indian independence. The Government of Tamil Nadu eventually ordered it changed to Chennai.)

== Early Life and Background ==
Damarla Chennapa Nayaka was born into the Damarla clan, a prominent Velama clan hailing from present day Andhra Pradesh. He was the son of Damarla Venkatapathi Naidu, a chieftain who already held influence in the region around present day Hosur (then part of the Vijayanagara administrative division).

Chennapa Nayaka further consolidated his family’s power through a strategic marriage to Akkamamba, the daughter of Velugoti Kasturi Ranga, the ruler of Venkatagiri, and younger sister of the powerful general Velugoti Yachama Nayaka. Damarla family initially served as governors for the Vijayanagara Empire. However, following the empire’s decline after the Battle of Talikota (1565), they began to exercise greater autonomy, effectively becoming independent rulers.

Chennapa Nayaka is said to have died in 1580.

== Legacy ==
Chennapa Nayaka's most significant legacy is posthumous. After his death, his son, Damarla Ayyappa Nayaka, and his brother, Venkatadri Nayaka, managed his territories. In 1639, seeking to mediate between warring European powers, the Portuguese in Mylapore and the Dutch in Pulicat, Ayyappa Nayaka granted land to the British East India Company to build a trading post.

This new settlement was named Chennapatnam (transl. City of Chennappa) in honor of his father. It later merged with the British Fort St. George to form the modern city of Chennai.
