= Thogur =

- village
- Country: India
- State: Tamil Nadu

Languages
  - Official: Tamil
- Time zone: UTC+5:30 (IST)

Thogur is a small, remote village in the Thanjavur district, situated near the ancient Kallanai Dam (often known as the Grand Anicut).
