= Sriranga II =

Emperor of Vijayanagara from 1614 to 1615

Emperor of Vijayanagara
- Reign: October 1614 – February 1615
- Predecessor: Venkata II
- Successor: Jagga Raya (de facto)
- Died: February 1615; Vellore, Vijayanagara
- Issue: Rama Deva Raya
- Father: Rama Deva

Sriranga II (died February 1615), also known as Sriranga Chika Raya, was nominated in 1614 by Emperor Venkata II to succeed him as the Emperor of Vijayanagara. Sriranga was supported by a faction headed by Yachama Nayaka of Recherla Velama dynasty, one of the Venkata II's loyal viceroys and commanders and Nayak of Venkatagiri, but was not favored by a set of nobles headed by Gobburi Jagga Raya, brother (or father) of Venkata II's favourite consort, Empress Bayamma.

== Coup and Murder ==
The presence of a putative heir of former Emperor Venkata II further worsened matters. Jagga Raya, with two of his lieutenants, seized Sriranga II and his family and threw them into prison at Vellore Fort and crowned the namesake son of the former emperor.

Yachama Nayaka opposed the plans of Jagga Raya and, with the help of a washerman, smuggled Sriranga's 12-year-old second son, Rama, from the fort. However, a subsequent attempt by Yachama Naidu to bring Sriranga II and his family through an underground escape tunnel was discovered, making Sriranga II's confinement more severe.

Finally, Yachama Nayaka arranged with a captain of the Vellore Fort to kill the guards and release Sriranga II and his family. The guards were eventually killed, but the news reached Jagga Raya first, and he rushed in before Yachama Nayaka could succeed and tasked his brother named Chinna Obo Raya to persuade Sriranga II and his family to either kill themselves or be killed by him if they refuse to do so. In pain, Sriranga II agreed to Chinna Obo Raya's words, killing his family and finally himself.

== Aftermath ==
Yachama attacked Chandragiri and captured the fort, but the putative heir of Venkata II and a few of his nobles managed to escape from the fort and joined Jagga Raya's camp. The murder of the royal family created shock through the empire, fomenting hatred of Jagga Raya and his group. As a result, when Yachama headed his forces towards the Vellore fort, there was no one to oppose him, and the fort was surrendered without any resistance. Many nobles and chieftains deserted the Jagga Raya faction and joined Yachama's camp, which backed a legal royal claimant.

Thus Sriranga II was killed within four months of his accession, but one of his sons, Ramadeva, escaped from the massacre to become the next Emperor of Vijayanagara, after winning a gruesome war of succession (Battle of Toppur) in 1617 CE.

Preceded by Venkata II	Vijayanagar empire 1614	Succeeded by Rama Deva Raya
