= Penukonda =

Penukonda Penugonda
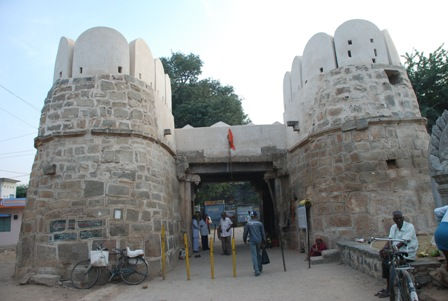
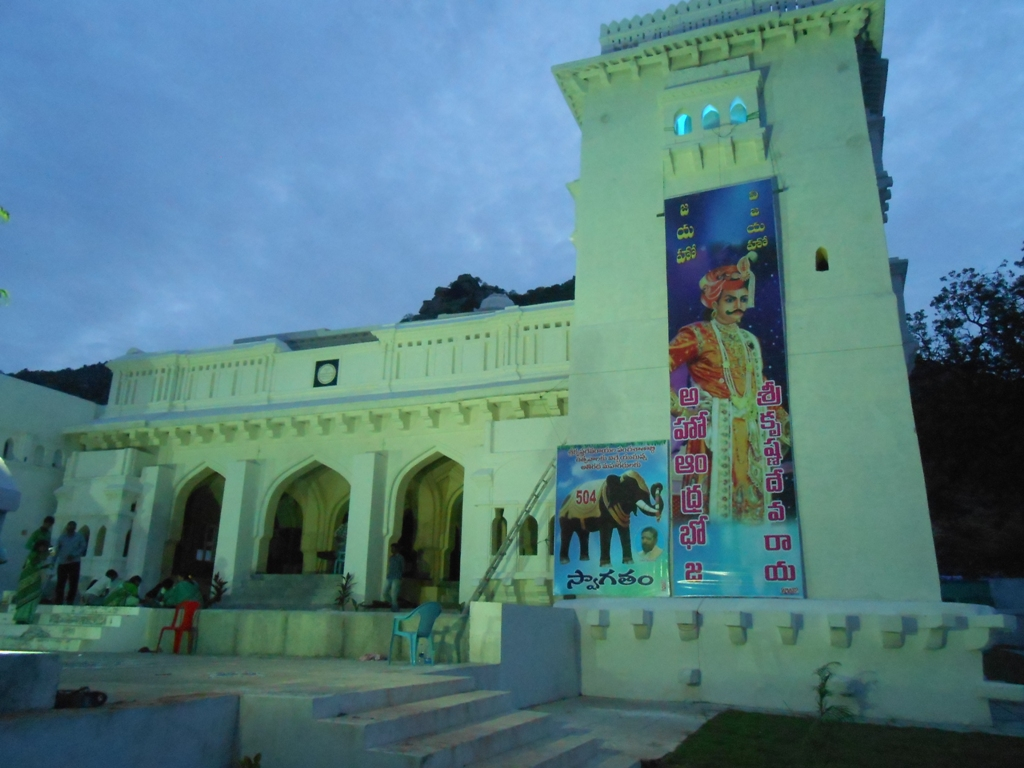
- Top to bottom: Chilla Konda near Penukonda, Penukonda fort, Gagan Mahal

- Location in Andhra Pradesh, India
- Coordinates: 14.085°N 77.596°E
- Country: India
- State: Andhra Pradesh
- District: Sri Sathya Sai district

Government
  - Type: Panchayati raj
  - Body: Gram Panchayat

Area
  - Total: 6.5 km^{2} (2.5 sq mi)
- Elevation: 769 m (2,523 ft)

Population (2011)
  - Total: 27,382
  - Density: 4,200/km^{2} (11,000/sq mi)
- Demonym: penukondavi

Languages
  - Official: Telugu
- Time zone: UTC+5:30 (IST)
- Postal code: 515110
- Vehicle registration: AP 02
- Nearest city: Hindupuram
- Legislative Assembly constituency: Penukonda

Penukonda also called Penugonda is a town in the Sri Sathya Sai district of Andhra Pradesh, India. It is 70 km away from Anantapur town.

== Demography ==
According to The Imperial Gazetteer of India, Penukonda was a subdivision and taluk of Anantapur district in Madras province. It contains 96 villages covering an area of 677 square miles. The population in 1901 was 92,482 compared with 81,104 in 1891. Penukonda was the headquarters with a population of 6,806. The Penner River flows along its western and Chitravati river along its eastern boundary.

== History ==
This region was controlled at different points in history by the Hoysalas, Chalukyas, Vijayanagar, Nawabs, Maratha chieftain Murari Rao, Tipu Sultan, Nizam and eventually came under British rule after it was ceded to the British by the Nizam of Hyderabad. It was a melting pot of different religions but the town and fort were established by early Hoysala kings, who were practitioners of Jainism.

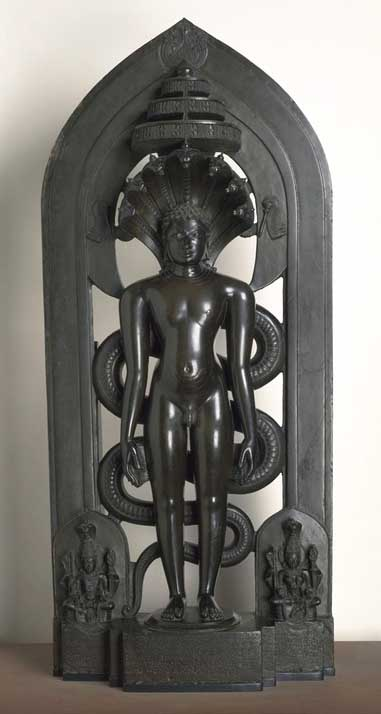
Parsvanath image in Penukonda style

After Krishna Deva Raya, Venkatapathi Rayalu, the Emperor of Vijayanagar, took over. He made Raya Dalavayi Koneti Naidu (son of Kasturi Naidu, grandson of Akkappa Naidu, great-grandson of Kanaka Naidu of Chandragiri), as the governor of Penukonda and conferred him the title with Maha-Raja-Raja-Sri and celebrated Koneti Naidu's marriage with Swarna. Koneti Naidu ruled Penukonda, Rayadurgam and Kundurpi Forts for about 17 years (1635-1652 AD). After the ruling of Koneti Nayudu his descendants Raya Dalavayi Sri Venkatapathi Nayudu, Peda Timmappa Nayudu, Venkatapathi Nayudu, Koneti Nayudu, Rajagopala Nayudu and Timmappa Nayudu ruled this Penukonda. Following Vijayanagara's defeat at the Battle of Talikota in 1565, Tirumala moved the capital of the Empire to Penukonda, where it stayed until 1592.

Famous Rajguru of Karnataka empire at Vijayanagara, Shri Vyasarajaru is said to have installed 50% of his 732, self sculpted, consecrated prana devara(Hanuma Bhima Madhwa) Idols in and around penukonda in a 10km radius.

Because of its ancient Jain history and presence of many temples it is one of the most revered places for Jains. In the Tamil Jain tradition, this is counted as one of the four Jain centers of learning (Vidystahana) i.e. a Bhattaraka matha which are Delhi, Kolhapur, Jina Kanchi and Penukonda. The famous Pache Parsvanath Swamy Temple, with idol of Parsvanath containing a single green coloured stone (Pacha) is located here. According to the inscription on the image, it was consecrated in A.D. 1359, by a disciple of Mula Sangh Nandisangha's Balatkara Gana, Saraswathi Gachha, Kondakundanvaya's Priyarajaguru Mandalacharya Maghanandi Siddantha Deva. It was once the seat of a Jain Bhattaraka, established in A.D. 1359. The seat became extinct and the local Jain population declined. However the temple is well preserved. Also located here is the historic Ajitnath temple from the same period. After renovation by the Gowdanakunte family of Amarapura, it was preserved by Muni 108 Sri Ajithakeerthi Maharaj. After his samdhi in 1966, the temple was in poor condition byt has recently been renovated by the Dharmasthala institution.

Kumbakarna garden here spreading over 5 acres has a Gigantic statue of the sleeping Kumbhakarna, measuring 142 feet in length and 32 feet in height into whose cavernous belly one can walk. Several asuras are seen trying to wake up the sleeping Giant, depicting the famous story of this in invincible brother of Ravana in Ramayana.

A Tomb of Baba Fakruddin a sufi saint who settled in Penukonda. Notable names in history – The Penukonda family name was responsible for developing the popular Kadapa stone that is used for granite countertops.
