= Nayaks of Vellore =

Rulers of Vellore, India from 15th to 16th century CE

Vellore Nayaks
- 1540–1601
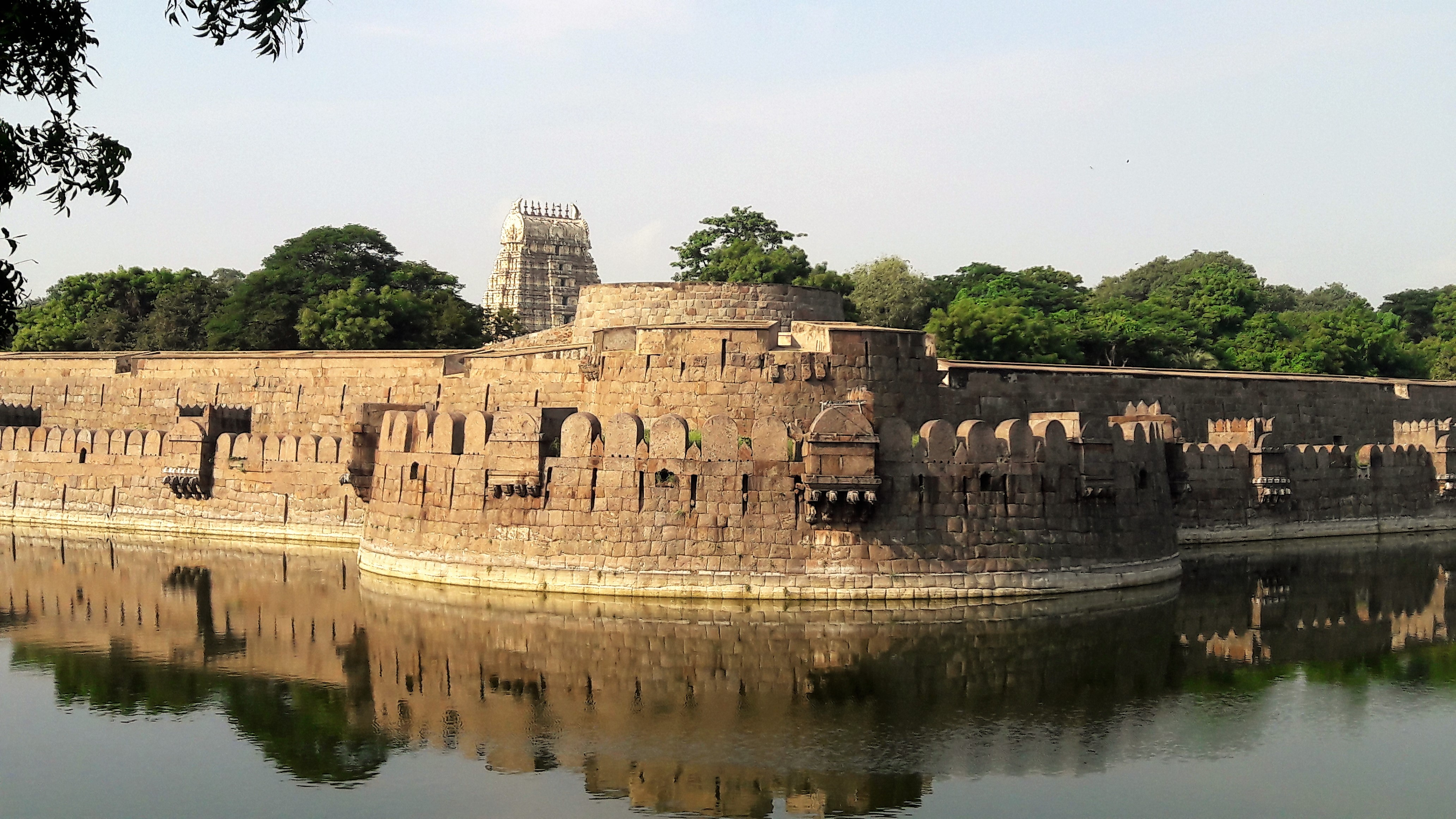
- The Fort at Vellore
- Capital: Vellore
- Common languages: Telugu; Tamil
- Government: Nayakship
- King
- History
  - Established: 1540
  - Disestablished: 1601
Preceded by	Succeeded by
Gajapati Kingdom	Vijayanagara Empire
- Today part of: Tamil Nadu, Andhra Pradesh

The Nayaks of Vellore were local Telugu chieftains of the Vellore principality of Vijayanagar Emperor in the 16th century CE. They were subordinates appointed as provincial governors by the Vijayanagar Emperor, who divided their entire kingdom into various Nayakships viz., Madurai, Thanjavur and Senji. Later, after the fall of the Vijayanagara's Tuluva dynasty in 1565, the other Nayaks of the Tamil region declared independence, but Vellore Nayakship continued to remain under the Aravidu Dynasty of the Vijayanagar Empire.

== History of the region ==
The region was under many dynasties throughout the time. It was annexed from the Pandyan Empire to the Gajapati Kingdom in the early 15th century. The southern parts of the Gajapati empire was annexed to the Vijayanagar Empire by Achyuta Deva Raya in the 1530s, and created the Nayakship of Vellore.

== List of Nayaks ==
The list of nayaks are unclear. Some of the Nayaks are:

- Chinna Bommi Reddy
- Thimma Reddy Nayak
- Lingama Nayak

=== Vellore Fort ===
The fort of Vellore was built around 1566 CE by Chinna Bommi Reddy and Thimma Reddy Nayak during this Nayakship period. The fort went on to become an important strategic position in the future.

== Rebellion ==
After the independence of the other Nayaks, Vellore also eyed for independence and Lingama Nayak revolted against the crown in 1601. One of the generals of the crown, Yachamanedu came to Vellore and defeated Lingama Nayak. This led to the end of the Nayakship, and the region went under the direct rule of the Vijayanagar King Venkata II. In 1604, the capital of the declining Vijayanagar empire was shifted to Vellore.
