= Venkatagiri estate =

Madras Presidency estate in Andhra Pradesh, India

Coordinates: 13°58′N 79°35′E

Venkatagiri Estate
- Zamindari of British India
- 1600–1949
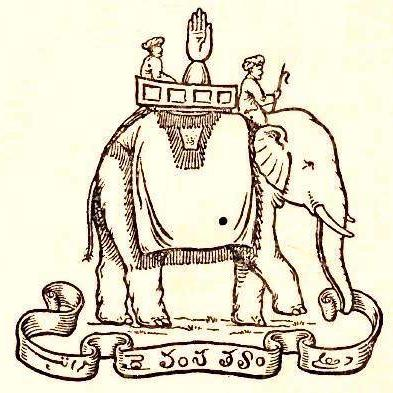
- Coat of arms
- Area
  - 1901: 4,103.34 km^{2} (1,584.31 sq mi)
- Population
  - 1901: 60,861
- History
  - Established: 1600
  - Abolition of the estate: 7 September 1949
Succeeded by
India

The Venkatagiri estate was an estate in the erstwhile Madras Presidency. It was located in the Nellore district of the present-day Andhra Pradesh. The town of Venkatagiri was the administrative headquarters.

== History ==
=== Medieval times ===
The kingdom was founded circa 1208 AD by Warrior King Velugoti Recharla Bhetala Naidu and existed since the time of Kakatiyas during the reign of Kakati Ganapathi Deva Rai. Later the kingdom was a feudatory under Vijaynagar Empire.

=== Under Vijaynagar Empire ===
Once part of Vijayanagar Empire the kingdom was reestablished by Velugoti Rayudappa Nayani in 1600. The State endured until it was notified and taken over by the State on 7 September 1949, under the Madras Estates (Abolition and Conversion into Ryotwari) Act, 1948 (Act 26 of 1948). They belonged to the Velugoti Dynasty of the Padmanayaka Velama caste. Notable rulers include Rajagopala Krishna Yachendra (1857–1916).

==== Yachama Naidu ====
Yachama Naidu was one of the famous chiefs of this line during the late 16th and early 17th century. He was a loyalist of Venkata II and Sriranga II. Yachama Naidu was also the son of Kasturi Ranga, another famous general of Venkatagiri royal family. He helped Venkata II to capture territory from the Deccan Sultans and also quelled rebellions by Nayaks of Vellore and Madurai. When Sriranga II succeeded Venkata II, Yachama supported him against Jagga Raya's faction. Yachama Naidu saved Sriranga II's son Rama Deva Raya by smuggling him out of the Vellore prison, with the help of a Washerman, when Sriranga II's family was imprisoned by Jagga Raya. However, he was unable to prevent the murder of Sriranga II's entire family. He fought on behalf of Rama Deva Raya at Toppur with support from Raghunatha Nayak of Tanjore and killed Jagga Raya seizing his Gobburi Estates which formed the regions of Pulicat, Chengalpet and Maduranthakam, but later completely brought under control of Vellore, under control of Rama Deva Raya, the Vijayanagara Emperor.

During later part of 20th century some of the villages were purchased by Raja of Venkatagiri.

=== Under Arcot and British ===
By 17th century the kingdom became a quasi-independent feudatory of Arcot Nawab. Due to their military service to Mughals a sannad from Mughal emperor in 1695 granted free jahir of fourteen taluks of their existing domains that included four taluks of Sarwapalli, Nellore, Rapur and Venkatagiri in Sarwapalli Sarcar. six taluks of Kalahasti, Satyaneru, Chenur, Gudur, Thirupati and Sagutur in Chandragiri Sarcar, three taluks of Vishnukanchi, Karangudi and Mosaravaka in Kanchi Sarcar and one taluk of Poonamallee in Thirupachur Sarcar. Thus estate became part of British India a part of erstwhile Madras Presidency with Venkatagiri estate a revenue administration zone under the Venkatagiri Rajas. By then the estate consisted of 736 Villages and 617 majara villages.

In 1892 post Arcot annexure to the British, the state was eventually reorganized as Zanindari estate under British India and existed till Independence.

== Administration and grants ==
=== Location ===
The princely state later permanent settlement Zamindari estate was located mostly in present-day Nellore district of erstwhile Madras Presidency. It is bounded on the east partly by the Bay of Bengal and partly by certain Government tracts of Nellore district, on the south by Kalahasti Zemindari, on the west by the Eastern Ghats, lying as boundary between Nellore and Cuddapah Districts, and on the north by Kurnool and Guntur Districts.

=== Administrative zones ===
The estate consisted of two administrative divisions, one northern and other southern, each further divided by five taluks. The southern division taluks were Venkatagiri, Rapur, Sagutur, Mallam, Polur and Manubolu, and the Northern division taluks were Pellur, Podili, Darsi, Kanigiri, Kocherlakota, and Marella. Each division had a Peishkar, and each Revenue Taluks were managed by a Tahsildar assisted by his Sheristadar, Revenue Inspector, and other staff. The Dewan's Office with a Manager, and a Dewan is at the head of the whole management.

The extent of the Estate during the British era was about 2,117 square miles encompassing around 800 villages, belonging to the Estate proper along with another 625 hereditary enjoyment villages, 215 Agraharams or Shrotriems, 10 Amarams or personal Inams and 12 temple Agraharams.

=== Grants and establishments ===
The Rajas invested Rs. 50,000 as permanent Fund for the Venkatagiri Rajahs' High School, Nellore.

The present day Monegar Choultry in George Town, Chennai function in the premises and facilities on what was originally Rajah Venkatagiri Choultry. It was then built in 18th century next to the then existing older Monegar Choultry for feeding a hundred poor persons and giving alms to another hundred every day with investments made in Government Securities for its upkeep. In 1885 a sum of one lakh was donated for the construction of the Victoria Gosha Hospital for Women, now known as Government Kasturba Gandhi Hospital for Women and Children in Triplicane, Chennai. In early 20th century during, Raja Venugopala Krishna Yachendra founded the Veterinary Hospital in Chennai. In 1920 the Rajas donated Rs50,000 towards setting up of a pavilion at Guindy Race Course and another sum for constructing the main building of Madras Gymkhana at the Island Grounds, Chennai.

The land where The Hindu newspaper office in Anna Salai is situated and the Osborne House at Royapettah in Chennai once belonged to the Raja of Venkatagiri.

== See also ==
- Rajagopala Krishna Yachendra

== See also ==
- List of zamindari estates in Madras Presidency
