= Vijayanagara Army =

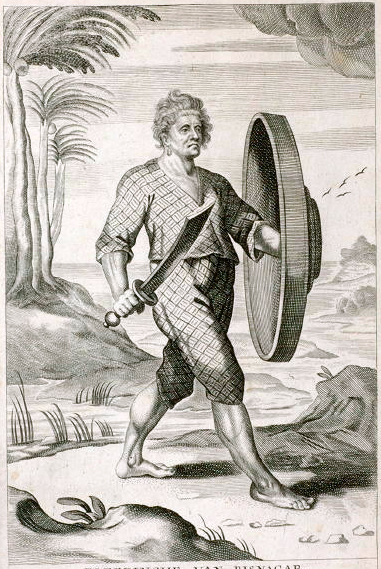
Clothing of a Vijayanagar soldier

The Vijayanagara Army supported the Vijayanagara Empire in particular with regard to the empire's long-lasting rivalry with the Bahmani Sultanate and the Deccan sultanates. Besides a large standing army, the Vijayanagara rulers also maintained a powerful navy. This helped make the Vijayanagara empire the most centralised polity ever to have emerged in southern India.

== Numbers ==
The numerical strength of the Vijayanagara army is disputed. Niccolò de' Conti reported a figure of 245,000 men during the reign of Krishnadevaraya, but Fernao Nuniz claimed it to be around 200,000, consisting of 170,000 foot soldiers, 30,000 cavalry and 550 war elephants. Rayawacha countered that the force contained 500,000 foot soldiers, 60,000 cavalry and 1,200 war elephants.

Deva Raya II, to counter the superior Bahmani cavalry, is believed to have enrolled 2000 Muslim cavalrymen to teach the art of archery to his Hindu soldiers and officers.

== Hoysala influence ==
The military leadership of the Hindu confederacy which Ballala III had so ably wielded devolved apparently on the Vijayanagara kings after his death. The Vijayanagara principality was at this time the most influential, besides it was situated at a strategic point, and therefore, the Vijayanagara kings were likely to accomplish the great mission of Ballala III, viz., that of warding off the Muslim menace and rebuilding a Hindu empire in South India. The Vijayanagara kings were rapidly rising and after A. D. 1346 they gradually absorbed the whole of the Hoysala Empire as a matter of course, without the least sign of opposition. An inscription dated A. D 1346, belonging to Ballala IV, is found in the Begurr Hobli, Bangalore Taluk, and the very next year an inscription belonging to Harihara 1 is found in the same Hobli*. It is therefore evident that the Vijayanagara kings occupied the Hoysala empire within a very short period. Many of the early Vijayanagara inscriptions describe Harihara and Bukka as ruling “the Hoysala kingdom”.

== Branches ==
The Vijayanagara army contained two main branches, being the Kaijeeta Sainya and the Amaranayaka Sainya. Sainya roughly means army.

=== Kaijeeta Sainya ===
The Kaijeeta is Vijayanagar claims that it comprised 50,000 men during the reign of Krishna Deva Raya, including 2,00,000 horsemen who served as palace guards and 2,000 who served as the emperor's personal bodyguards. Razak Rayala says that the army was on salary, being paid every four months rather than by the award of jagirs.

=== Amaranayaka Sainya ===
The Amaranayaka Sainya was maintained using the feudal nayankara system of the Kakatiyas. For this purpose, the empire was divided into Amaras (areas of revenue-producing land), that were granted to leaders called Nayakas. In return, these Nayakas supplied soldiers when required. The number supplied depended on the rank of the Nayaka, who himself divided lands among his subordinates. According to Nuniz, the Amaranayaka army strength stood at 600,000 during the rule of Achyuta Deva Raya; Rayawacha itemised the forces supplied as being 200,000 foot soldiers, 24,000 cavalry, 1,200 war elephants.

== Composition ==
The Vijayanagara army consisted primarily of infantry, cavalry and war elephants, armed with bows and arrows, swords and lances as its principal weapons. According to Ferishta, the foot soldiers applied oil to their bodies but did not wear armour or helmets, whereas Portuguese travellers, such as Pace and Barros, described protective clothing made of animal skin and that they carried shields.

Although the Vijayanagran kings had little interest in guns, the infantry did have a regiment of men armed with matchlock. They also built a navy, sited on the west coast, which was headed by the governor of Hanover Timmoju in the time of Krishna Deva Raya and which, according to Heeras Rayala, assisted the Portuguese in their occupation of Goa. The powerful navy enabled the Vijayanagara rulers to invade Sri Lanka repeatedly.

== Forts ==
Forts played an important role in medieval warfare. According to tradition, there were eight types of forts. However, Rayawachaka mentions four types of forts. They are giri (hill), stala, jala (water)and vana (forest) forts. Krishnaraya suggests that forts were mainly constructed in Gadi and border areas. Pace wrote that many forts were present in border areas. Deep forests were grown around forts. Catapults and damboli were used for fort defense. Damboli is a cannon which throws stones on enemies. To occupy forts they used lagga systems. Krishnadevaraya used them to occupy Kondaveedu fort.

== Recruitment ==
Emperor Krishna Deva Raya recruited soldiers from Kannada and Telugus of the frontier, Mysoreans and Malabarese from the west and centre, mixed with the Tamils from the remoter districts to the south. Empire training facilities improved bravery, interest in war, and body strength. According to books written in that time, the samu garidi (dance performance of knives and fire) and training gyms were both present throughout the country. Hontakaras trained the fighters. Since Vijayanagara was a multi-faith country, Muslims also joined the army. Their strength increased from the era of Deva Raya II and peaked in the time of Aliya Rama Raya, diminishing after his surprise defeat in the Battle of Talikota.

== See also ==
- Krishnadevaraya's Bahmani Expedition
- Military history of India
- Vijayanagara Empire
