= Nayakas of Kalahasti =

Line of rulers of the Kalahasti and Vandavasi principalities

The Nayakas of Kalahasti were a dynasty of rulers of Kalahasti and Vandavasi principalities. (Note: The last name of the rulers is also found written as Nayak, Nayakudu, Nayudu, or Nayakkar, depending on the language and orientation of the writers. The first name (which is a family name) is also written as Damal, a simplified form.) Members of the group include Damarla Chennapa Nayaka, after whom the city of Chennai is named. The Kalahasti Nayaks had their origins in the Padmanyaka warrior clans of present-day Andhra Pradesh. These Nayakas served as vassals of the late Vijayanagara Empire, then held by the Aravidu Dynasty and headquartered at Chandragiri and Vellore.

== Notable rulers ==
=== Damarla Chennappa Nayaka ===
Chennappa Nayaka was a Nayaka and trusted general under Sriranga Deva Raya. He married Akkamamba, the daughter of Venkatagiri ruler Velugoti Kasturi Ranga and younger sister of Velugoti Yachama Nayaka. Chennai, the capital of the Indian state of Tamil Nadu, is named in his honor.

=== Damarla Moodu Venkatappa Nayaka ===
Also known as Damarla Venkatadri or Venkatappa as he is called in Dutch records, was the son of Damarla Chennapa Nayaka. He was also in-charge of the administration of the Vijayanagara Empire during the reign of Peda Venkata Raya, and was the Nayaka of Kalahasti and directly controlled the region up to Wandiwash.

The land grant for the city of Madras was offered to the British by him and his brother, when they negotiated on behalf of Peda Venkata Raya of Vijayanagara Empire.

=== Damarla Ayyappa Nayaka ===
Damarla Ayyappa Nayaka was the brother of Damarla Venkatappa Nayaka and resided at Poonamallee to the west of Madras and administered the territory of Kalahasti for his brother.

=== Damarla Ankabhupala Nayaka ===
Damarla Ankabhupala Nayaka was younger brother of Damarla Venkatappa Nayaka and Damarla Ayyappa Nayaka Damarla Ankabhupala Nayaka was son of Damarla Chennapa Nayaka. He was Chief of Kalahasti. Ankabhugala was a well-known Writer In the Telugu literature Ankabhupala known by a Telugu Poem, Ushaparinayam which he wrote and dedicated to his father, Chennappa Nayaka and Ankabhupala has a single kanda verse (16 ganas with 64 matras) from which one can obtain 108 verses in the metre by shortening or elongating the vowels and changing the sequence of the word Damarla Ankabhupala was Royal Telugu poet

=== Damarla Timmappa Nayaka ===
Damarla Timmappa Nayaka son of Damarla Chennapa Nayaka. He was the Chief of Kalahasti.

=== Damarla Chenna Venkata ===
Damarla Chenna Venkata was the son of Damarla Chennappa Nayaka. Chenna Venkata was a poet. He wrote the Telugu poem Chitra Kavita.

== Second Mysore Wars ==
During the Second Mysore War, the Nayakas of Kalahasti took to the side of Hyder Ali while their northern superiors Venkatagiri Kings took to the side of Arcot and the British.

== Bibliography ==
- Rao, Velcheru Narayana; Shulman, David Dean; Subrahmanyam, Sanjay (1992), Symbols of Substance: Court and state in Nāyaka Period Tamilnadu, Oxford University Press, ISBN 978-0-19-563021-3
- Sastri, Alladi Jagannatha (1922). A Family History of Venkatagiri Rajas. Madras: Addison Press – via archive.org.
- Srinivasachari, C. S. (1939). History of the City of Madras. Madras: P. Varadachary & Co – via archive.org.
- Srinivasachari, C. S. (1943), A History of Gingee and its Rulers, Madras: Annamalai University – via archive.org
