= Venkatapati Raya =

Emperor of the Vijayanagara Empire from 1586 to 1614

- Maharajadhiraja; Maharaya; Vira
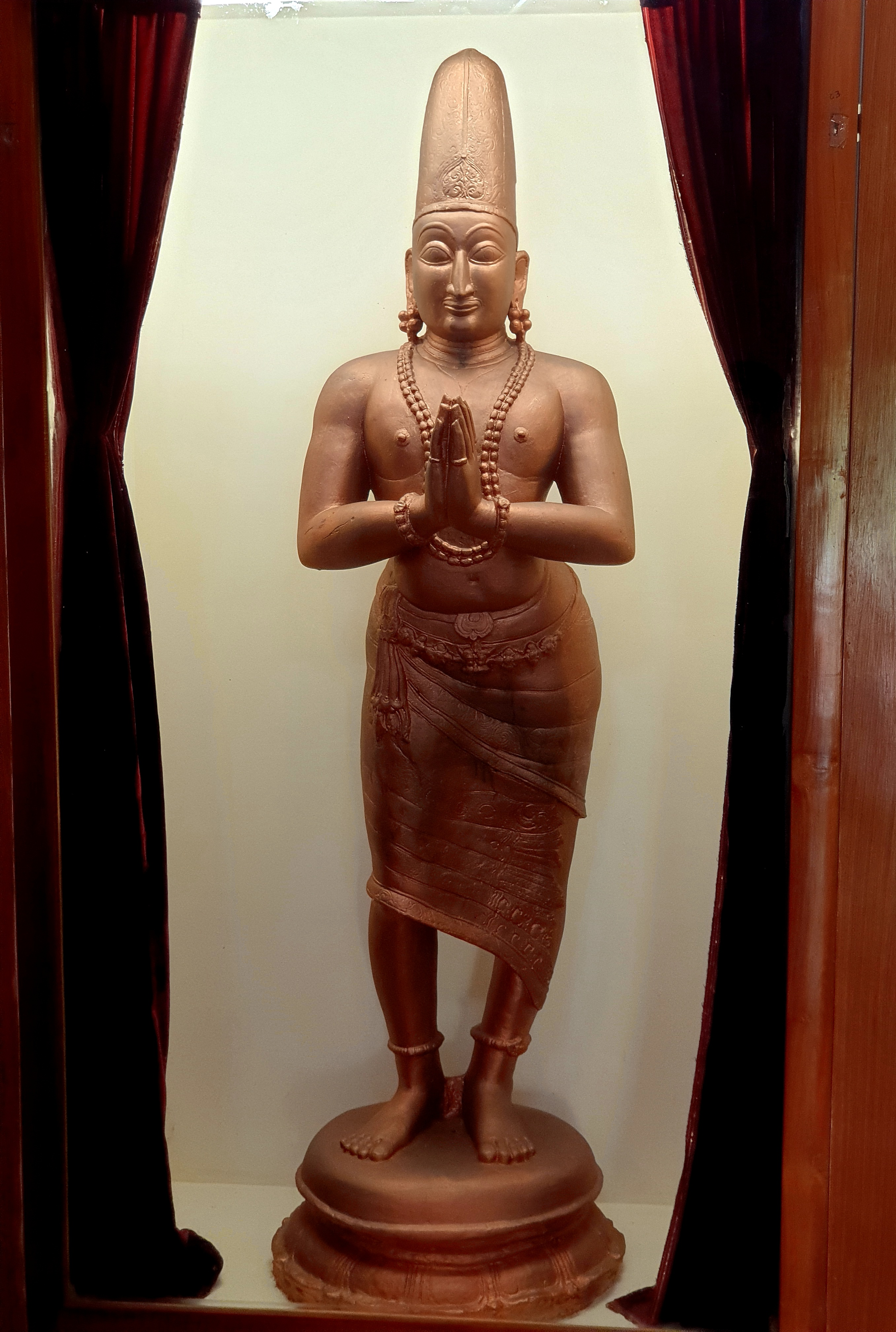
- Statue of Venkatapati Raya

Emperor of Vijayanagara
- Reign: January 1586 – October 1614
- Predecessor: Sriranga Deva Raya
- Successor: Sriranga II
- Born: 1540
- Died: October 1614 (aged 73–74); Vellore Fort, Vellore, Vijayanagara Empire (present-day Tamil Nadu, India)
- Spouse: Bayamma several others
- Dynasty: Aravidu
- Father: Tirumala Deva Raya
- Mother: Vengalamba
- Religion: Hinduism

Venkatapati Raya (c. 1540 – October 1614) also known as Venkata II, was the third Emperor of Vijayanagara from the Aravidu Dynasty. He succeeded his older brother, the Emperor Sriranga Deva Raya as the ruler of Vijayanagara Empire with bases in Penukonda, Chandragiri and Vellore. His reign of nearly three decades saw a revival in the strength and prosperity of the empire. He successfully dealt with the Turko-Persian Deccan sultans of Bijapur and Golkonda, the internal disorders, promoting economic revival in the realm. He subdued the rebelling Nayakas of Tamil Nadu and parts of present-day Andhra Pradesh.

== Early years ==
He was the fourth and the youngest son of the Emperor Tirumala Deva Raya and his Queen-consort Vengalamba and the younger brother of the Emperor Sriranga Deva Raya. He served as the governor of Chandragiri and the Viceroy of Tamil Country before ascending the throne of the Vijayanagara Empire in January 1586.

== Military campaigns ==
=== Siege of Penukonda (1605–1606) ===
Venkata II repulsed a major Golkonda offensive at Penugonda. During the siege, the Vijayanagara defense under Jagadeva Row, aided by the Tanjavur Nayak prince Raghunatha, routed key Qutb Shahi contingents; Saujāta Khan was killed, Citta Khan was captured, and other commanders were defeated, forcing Sultan Muhammad Quli Qutb Shah to abandon the siege and retreat.

=== War against the sultans and Battle of Pennar river ===
In 1588, he instigated a war with the Turko-Persian Golkonda and Bijapur Sultanates and captured some of the territories lost earlier by his predecessor. Kasturi Ranga Nayaka, a scion of Recherla Velama dynasty was sent to check the combined armies of the Sultanates. The Hindu army led by Kasturi Ranga and his son Yachama Nayaka achieved success in a series of battles. The Muslim soldiers who escaped in these battles with the Vijayanagara Army joined their main troops on the upper banks of the river Pennar. Historic accounts say that the strength of the sultanates' army was more than 120,000 and Turko-Afghan gunners were with them to fire their artillery units. Kasturi Ranga led his troops north and met the enemy directly on the upper bank of river Pennar.

The clash raged for eight hours, artillery units of the sultanate army created havoc in the Vijayanagara ranks but Yachama maintained discipline amongst his forces and rigorously pressed the attack. By the end of the day, the brave and wise generalship of Vijayanagara won the Battle of Pennar and more than 50,000 Turko-Persian Golkonda and Bijapur troops were killed including the sultanates' most able generals Rustam Khan and Khasim Khan. Imperial forces drove their enemies into the Golkonda territory but the quarrel amongst the emperor's nobles prevented further attempts on Golkonda. Several of his feudatories in his North now revolted against him, including some of Aliya Rama Raya's descendants, but he successfully subdued them.

=== Subjugation of the rebelling Nayaks ===
==== Nayak of Gingee ====
In 1586, the Nayak of Gingee rebelled against the emperor Venkatapati, who then captured him and had him put in prison. He was only freed when Raghunatha, the Nayak of Tanjore secured his release in exchange for aiding the emperor in his Penukonda campaign.

During his imprisonment, Gingee was governed by another Venkata, who was sent against him by the Emperor Venkatapathi Raya.

==== Nayak of Vellore ====
In 1601, another campaign led by his viceroy of Arcot and Chengelpet, Chennappa Nayaka subdued a revolt headed by Lingama Nayaka, the Nayak of Vellore. Later Lingama Nayaka of Vellore was defeated on the plains of Munnali, and the Vellore Fort was captured. Vellore came under direct control of the Emperor Venkatapati Raya. Another expedition headed by Yachama Nayaka went right into the Madurai Nayak province and subdued the revolting Nayaks.

==== Battle of Nandela ====
Chief of Nandyala Krishnamaraju revolted against Venkatapati Raya. Angered by this act the emperor sent an army under the command of Matla Ananta he defeated Krishnamaraju's army at Nandela.

==== Subjugation of provincial revolts ====
Various chiefs of Vijaynagar Empire provinces revolted against the emperor. To restore order the emperor sent an army under Matla chief Ananta to subjugate the rebel chiefs of various provinces. Matala Ananta defeated and killed Ravelia Velikonda Venkatadri, defeated unknown rebel in battle of Jammalamadugu, and reduced the fort of Cuttack. He defeated the chief Kondaraju Venkatadri and captured from him the town of Chennur. (Note: There are several settlements named Chennur in southeast India. The source does not specify which one is meant.) Gobburu chiefs rebelled against emperor velugoti chennaya defeated them at Kalimili. Velugoti Yachama Nayudu and his relative Singama Nayudu defeated Devaipupa Nayarlu at utramultur in the year 1601. Yachama Nayudu defeated Mountain Chiefs at Tirupati and Captured Chengalpattu. outside the fort of palembukota Yachama Nayudu defeated chief yatiraju. Raghunatha nayak waged war against murasa people and successfully subjugated them.

== Shifting the capital ==
Around 1592, Venkatapati shifted the imperial capital south from Penukonda to Chandragiri near the Tirupati hills. After 1604, he shifted capital further south from Chandragiri to Vellore, which was used as a major base.

== Revival ==
The northern territories of his empire were brought into order by offering easy terms on taxes and reviving agriculture, which was frequently run over by the invading Turko-Persian Sultans. Village administration was streamlined and judiciary was stringently enforced.

== Arrival of the Dutch ==
In 1608, the Dutch who were already trading in the Golkonda and Gingee regions sought permission to set up a factory in Pulicat. The English too started trading through the Dutch from Pulicat. Since 1586, Gobburi Obayama, the favorite queen-consort of Venkatapati Raya, now operating from the new capital at Chandragiri, was bequeathed Pulicat to rule. She also gave aid to Portuguese Jesuits to build a residence at Pulicat.

== Death and succession ==
Venkatapati, in spite of having several queens, did not have a son, hence appointed Sriranga II, the son of his older brother Rama as his successor. This was done to prevent one of his favorite queen Bayamma who practiced a fraud on the King by borrowing a baby of her Brahmin maid and calling it as her own. While Robert Swell's book mentions that the infant was surreptitiously introduced into the palace by Bayamma born out from the marriage of a niece of Venkata I (the son of Achyuta Deva Raya) and a Brahman boy, who had been and educated in the pretence that he was son of King Venkata.

Venkatapati Raya, knowing the controversial status of the so-called heir apparent, appointed Sriranga II, the son of his viceregal brother Rama, as his successor. However, Venkatapati Raya's death in October 1614 plunged the empire into a succession crisis that lasted four years. Because of the crisis, some nayaka vassals ceased sending tribute to the emperor, and the Turko-Persian Bijapur and Golconda Sultanates encroached further on the Vijayanagara empire. Venkatapati Raya was succeeded by Sriranga II.

== Bibliography ==
- Aiyar, R. Sathyanatha (1991) [first published 1924], History of the Nayaks of Madura, Asian Educational Services, ISBN 978-81-206-0532-9
- Rao, Velcheru Narayana; Shulman, David Dean; Subrahmanyam, Sanjay (1992), Symbols of substance: court and state in Nāyaka Period Tamilnadu, Oxford University Press, ISBN 978-0-19-563021-3
- Sastri, K. A. Nilakanta (1958), A History of South India: From Prehistoric Times to the Fall of Vijayanagar (Second ed.), Indian Branch, Oxford University Press
- Subrahmanyam, Sanjay; Shulman, David (2008), "The Men who would be King? The Politics of Expansion in Early Seventeenth-Century Northern Tamilnadu", Modern Asian Studies, 24 (2): 225–248, doi:10.1017/S0026749X00010301, ISSN 0026-749X, S2CID 146726950

Preceded by Sriranga I	Vijayanagar empire 1586–1614	Succeeded by Sriranga II
