= Thanjavur block =

Thanjavur block is a revenue block in the Thanjavur taluk of Thanjavur district, Tamil Nadu, India. There are a total of 61 villages in this block.

== List of Panchayat Villages ==
SI.No	Panchayat Village
1	Alakudi
2	Chitrakudi
3	Inathukanpatti
4	K.vallundampattu
5	Kadakadappai
6	Kalvirayanpettai
7	Kandithampattu
8	Kasanadu Pudur
9	Kattur
10	Kollangarai
11	Kondavittanthidal
12	Kudalur
13	Kulichapattu
14	Kurungalur
15	Kurungulam East
16	Kurungulam West
17	Kuruvadipatti
18	Madigai
19	Manakkarambai
20	Manangorai
21	Mariammankoil
22	Marudakkudi
23	Marungulam
24	Mathur East
25	Mathur West
26	Melaveli
27	Monnaiyampatti
28	N.vallundampattu
29	Nagathi
30	Nallicheri
31	Nanjikkottai
32	Narasanayagipuram
33	Neelagiri
34	Palliyeri
35	Perambur I Sethi
36	Perambur II Sethi
37	Pillaiyarpatti
38	Pillayarnatham
39	Pudupattinam
40	Rajendram
41	Ramanathapuram
42	Ramapuram
43	Rayanthur
44	Sakkarasamandam
45	Sennampatti
46	Siralur
47	Soorakkottai
48	Thandangorai
49	Thenperambur
50	Thirumalaisamudram
51	Thiruvedhikudi
52	Thittai
53	Thottakadu
54	Thirukanurpatti
55	Thuraiyur
56	Uamayaval Arcadu
57	Vadagal
58	Valamirankottai
59	Vallampudur
60	Vannarapettai
61	Vilar
