= Budalur block =

The Budalur block is a revenue block in the Thanjavur taluk of the Thanjavur district in Tamil Nadu, India. It has a total of 42 panchayat villages.

== List of Panchayat Villages ==
SI.No	Panchayat Village
1	Achampatti
2	Agarapettai
3	Alamelupuram
4	Aarcadu
5	Avarampatti
6	Boodhalur
7	Deekshasamudram
8	Indhalur
9	Kadambangudi
10	Kaankeyanpatti
11	Kachamangalam
12	Koothur
13	Koviladi
14	Kovilpathu
15	Maickelpatti
16	Maniyeripatti
17	Maaraneri
18	Megalathur
19	Muthuveerakandianpatti
20	Nandavanapatti
21	Nemam
22	Orathur
23	Palamaaneri
24	Palayapatti (north)
25	Palayapatti (south)
26	Pathirakkudi
27	Pavanamangalam
28	Pudukkudi
29	Pudupatti
30	Rajagiri
31	Ranganathapuram
32	Sanoorapatti
33	Sellappanpettai
34	Sengipatti
35	Solagampatti
36	Thiruchinampoondi
37	Thogur
38	Thondarayanpadi
39	Veeramarasanpettai
40	Vendayampatti
41	Vishnampettai
42	Vittalapuram
