= R. Swaminatha Merkondar =

Indian politician

- Born: R. Swaminatha Merkondar koonampatti, Thanjavur district, Tamilnadu
- Occupation: Politician

Sri R. Swaminatha Merkondar was an Indian politician. He represented the Tiruvaiyaru constituency in the Madras Assembly from 1957 to 1962.

== Early life ==
Merkondar was born in Koonampatti village of Thanjavur district. He is zamindar of Koonampatti and grandchild of S. Kumarasamy Merkondar (son in-law of Madukkur zamindar). Koonampatti zamindars are descendants of forest king Meicondan. In the last century Pudupatti, Thanjavur, Sengipatti belongs to Koonampatti Jameen Merkondar family. Koonampatti village was part of Korkai Nadu during the Chola period.

== Career ==
R. Swaminatha Merkondar was a member of the Indian National Congress party and represented the Tiruvaiyaru constituency in the Madras Assembly from 1957 to 1962. He served as a chairman of Budalur.

== Personal life ==
Swaminatha Merkondar married Sundarathammal and had Three son Zamin S Vijayakumar Merkondar, Zamin S Ramanathan Merkondar, Pannerselvam Merkondar and four daughters.
