= Koviladi, Thanjavur =

Neighbourhood in Thanjavur district, Tamil Nadu, India

Koviladi
- Neighbourhood
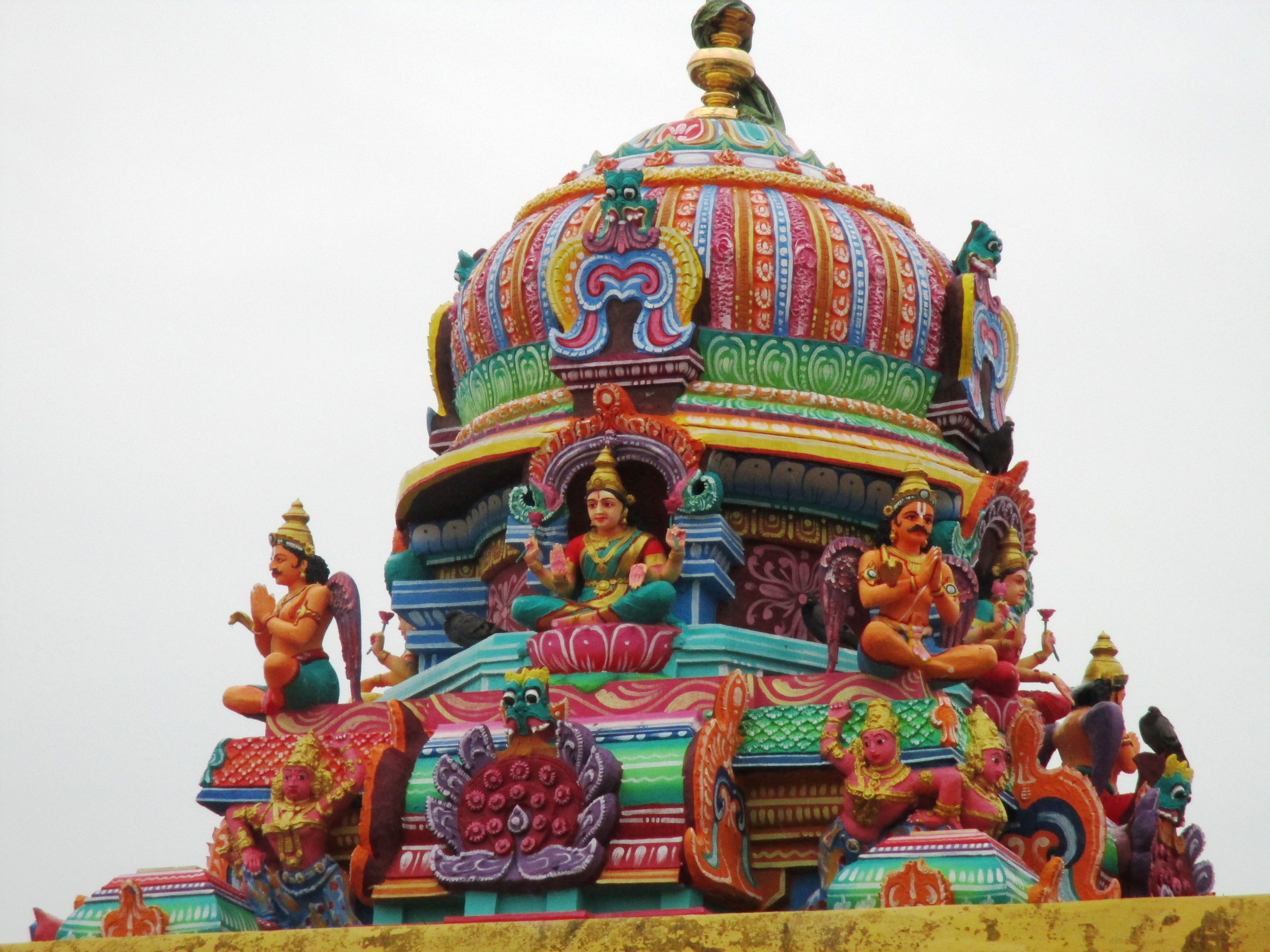
- Appakkudathaan Perumal Temple, Koviladi, Thanjavur district, Tamil Nadu

- Koviladi, Thanjavur district, Tamil Nadu
- Coordinates: 10.8404°N 78.8853°E
- Country: India
- State: Tamil Nadu
- District: Thanjavur
- Elevation: 81.79 m (268.3 ft)

Population (2011)
  - Total: 3,700

Languages
  - Official: Tamil
  - Speech: Tamil
- Time zone: UTC+5:30 (IST)
- PIN: 613105
- Other Neighbourhoods: Indalur, Tiruchinampoondi, Kachamangalam
- LS: Thanjavur
- VS: Tiruvaiyaru

Koviladi is a village in Thanjavur district of Tamil Nadu state in India.

== Location ==
Koviladi is located with the coordinates of (10.8404°N 78.8853°E) in Thanjavur district.

== Population ==
According to the 2011 census of India, Koviladi village had a population of 3,700, out of which 1,829 persons are males and 1,871 persons are females.

== Religion ==
=== Temples ===
A Perumal temple one of the 108 Divya desams, viz., Appalarenganathar Swamy Temple and a Shiva temple named Divyagnanesvarar Temple which are maintained under the control of Hindu Religious and Charitable Endowments Department, are situated at Koviladi.
