= Divyagnanesvarar Temple, Koviladi =

Shiva temple in Thanjavur district, Tamil Nadu, India

Divyagnanesvarar Temple
- Divyagnanesvarar Temple, Koviladi, Thanjavur district, Tamil Nadu

Religion
- Affiliation: Hinduism
- District: Thanjavur
- Deity: Divyagnanesvarar
- Festival: Maha Shivaratri

Location
- Location: Koviladi
- State: Tamil Nadu
- Country: India
- Interactive map of Divyagnanesvarar Temple
- Coordinates: 10.840755°N 78.889115°E

Architecture
- Type: Dravidian architecture
- Completed

Specifications
- Temple: One
- Elevation: 81.51 m (267 ft)

Divyagnanesvarar Temple is a Hindu temple dedicated to the deity Shiva, located at Koviladi in Thanjavur district in Tamil Nadu, India.

== Vaippu Sthalam ==
It is one of the shrines of the Vaippu Sthalams sung by Tamil Saivite Nayanar Appar.

== Presiding deity ==
The presiding deity in the garbhagriha is represented by the lingam known as Divyagnanesvarar. The Goddess is known as Akilandesvari.

== Specialities ==
In the inscriptions found in the Shiva temples of this place there are references such as "Pandi Kulasini Valanattu, Valla Nattu Melaimuri Tirusadaimudi Tirusadaimudiyudaya Mahadevar Temple..." and "Tirupper Perunkuri Mahasabaiyom Ivvur Vada Pidakai Tirusadaimudi Tirusadaimudiyudaya Mahadevar Temple...". From these the names of the place and the deity of this temple could be inferred. Now this place is known as Koviladi. During the period of Appar this place was known as Sadaimudi. Now it is called as Koviladi. This place was also called as Tirupper Nagar. The Shiva temple was found in one of the parts of Tirupper Nagar. From inscriptions it is learnt that this place was called as Tiruppuram. In Tirupper, a Vishnu temple known as Appakkudathaan Temple, sung by Alvars is found. The place where Shiva temple was found was known as Tirupperpuram. During early period a war was waged in this place. This is the place where Kochengatcholan arrested Seraman Kanaikkal Irumporai, the Chera king. As Shiva and Vishnu temples are found, this place is known as Tirupper.

== Location ==
This temple is located at Kandiyur-Thirukattupalli-Kallanai-Trichy road, at a distance of 9 km from Thirukattupalli. Thi temple can be reached after crossing the Kaveri bridge in Thirukattupalli in Kallanai road, at a distance of 8 km.
