= Pudupattinam =

Pudupattinam may refer to:

- Pudupattinam, Chengalpattu
- Pudupattinam, Pattukkottai taluk
- Pudupattinam, Thanjavur taluk

== See also ==
- Pudupatti (disambiguation)
