= Soorakottai Singakutti =

- Theatrical release poster
- Directed by: Rama Narayanan
- Produced by: AVM Kumaran; Padma Kumaran; AVM K. Shanmugam
- Starring: Prabhu; Silk Smitha
- Music by: Ilaiyaraaja
- Production company: AVM Productions
- Release date: 9 September 1983
- Country: India
- Language: Tamil

Soorakottai Singakutti (transl. The lion cub from Soorakkottai) is a 1983 Indian Tamil-language masala film, directed by Rama Narayanan for AVM Productions. The film stars Prabhu and Silk Smitha, with Gemini Ganesan, C. R. Vijayakumari, V. K. Ramasamy, and Prameela in supporting roles. It was released on 9 September 1983.

== Plot ==
Viswanathan, a happily married landlord befriends a dancer. Later she shows her true colours, separates him from his wife and marries him. Meanwhile, Selvam, a vibrant youth hears from his mother about his past and vows to avenge the person who caused injustice to his family. How he manages to do it, is the rest of the story.

== Cast ==
- Prabhu as Selvam
- Silk Smitha as Sokki
- Gemini Ganesan as Viswanathan
- C. R. Vijayakumari as Lakshmi
- Prameela as Kalyani
- V. K. Ramasamy as Velu
- Sangili Murugan as Nondy
- Vennira Aadai Moorthy as Marriage Broker
- S. S. Chandran as Chengalpattu Senthamarai Pulavar
- Bindu Ghosh as Shantha
- Omakuchi Narasimhan
- Gundu Kalyanam
- Ramarajan (Uncredited)
- Kuyili as dancer in song "Appan Pecha"

== Soundtrack ==
Soundtrack was composed by Ilaiyaraaja and lyrics were written by Vaali.

Song	Singers
"Kalidasan Kannadasan"	P. Jayachandran, P. Susheela
"Onnum Theriyatha"	S. P. Balasubrahmanyam, S. Janaki
"Kaaka Pudippen"	Malaysia Vasudevan
"Appan Petcha"	S. P. Balasubrahmanyam
"Nillena Nillena"	Malaysia Vasudevan, S. Janaki
"Naan Thaanda Pookkaari"	S. Janaki, Malaysia Vasudevan

== Reception ==
S. Shivakumar of Sunday Mid-Day called it "the worst AVM presentation I have ever seen" and went on to write "With absolutely no plot, director Ram Narayan depends on his abundant talent in penning the now proverbial double meaning dialogues to stimulate the baser instincts of the filmmakers 'main food'". Balumani of Anna praised acting, music and direction and felt the climax was similar to Manohara and could have been avoided. The film failed at the box office, partly due to audience's reluctance to accept Smitha as a lead actress.
