= Iravathesvarar Temple, Nemam =

Shiva temple in Tamil Nadu, India

Iravatheswarar Temple
- Iravatheswarar Temple, Nemam, Thanjavur, Tamil Nadu

Religion
- Affiliation: Hinduism
- District: Thanjavur
- Deity: Iravatheswarar
- Festival: Maha Shivaratri

Location
- Location: Nemam
- State: Tamil Nadu
- Country: India
- Interactive map of Iravatheswarar Temple
- Coordinates: 10.8489°N 78.9305°E

Architecture
- Type: Dravidian architecture
- Completed

Specifications
- Temple: One
- Elevation: 78.65 m (258 ft)

Iravathesvarar Temple is a Hindu temple dedicated to the deity Shiva, located at Nemam in Thanjavur district, Tamil Nadu, India.

== Vaippu Sthalam ==
It is one of the shrines of the Vaippu Sthalams sung by Tamil Saivite Nayanar Appar. According to Periya Puranam, after worshipping Shiva at Nedungalam, Sambandar came to this place on his way to Thirukattupalli. This place is also known as Niyamam.

== Presiding deity ==
The presiding deity in the garbhagriha, represented by the lingam, is known as Iravathesvarar. The Goddess is known as Alangara Nayaki. Appar in his song 'Panmalintha Vendalai' praises the deity. The garbhagriha is in the form of moat. The Goddess is also known as Alankaravalli.

== Specialities ==
Nemam is on the southern banks of Cauvery. This place was known as Parijatha Vanam in Kirutha Yuga, Beemesvaram in Treta Yuga, Indira Vanam in the Dvapara Yuga and Iravathesvaram the Kali Yuga. Brahma, Indra, Rambai and Iravatham worshipped the presiding deity of the temple. In the Brahmanda Purana the deity was known as in five names such as Parijavanesvarar, Brahmapurisvarar, Indrapurisvarar, Pushpavanesvarar and Iravathesvarar. Once after dancing, Rambai slept in her bed. While in sleep her dress was not found in proper form. Narada who came there, saw her and cursed to go Earth. She started worshipping the presiding deity of this place. Without Rambai, Indraloka was not in its form. So, Indra sent, Iravatham to bring back her. She, in turn, said that she would not come without the permission of Shiva. Iravatham tried to lift her and failed in the attempt. Indra searched for them and came to this place. He prayed Shiva and got back Iravatham and Rambai with blessings.

== Structure ==
Facing east, the temple has three tier gopura. After going through the entrance nandhi can be found at 3' below the ground level. In the garbhagriha, the presiding deity is facing east. In the kosta Brahma, Dakshinamurthy and Durga are found. In the west prakara shrines of Vinayaka, Subramania with his consorts Valli and Deivanai and Navagraha are found. Sanisvara is found with his Vahana crow.

== Location ==
The temple is located at a distance of 3 km. from Thirukattupalli, also known as Melai Thirukattupalli in Thirukattupalli-Thokur road. This temple is opened for worship from 10.00 a.m. to 11.30 6.00 p.m. to 8.00 p.m.
