= Pillaiyarpatti =

Pillaiyarpatti may refer to these places in Tamil Nadu, India:

- Karpaka Vinayakar Temple near Karaikudi
- Pillaiyarpatti, Thanjavur district, a village in Thanjavur
