= Nandavanampatti =

Coordinates: 10°23′N 77°59′E

- village
- Interactive map of Nandavanampatti
- Country: India
- State: Tamil Nadu
- District: Thanjavur
- Taluk: Thanjavur

Population (2001)
  - Total: 1,895

Languages
  - Official: Tamil
- Time zone: UTC+5:30 (IST)

Nandavanampatti is a village in the Thanjavur taluk of Thanjavur district, Tamil Nadu, India.

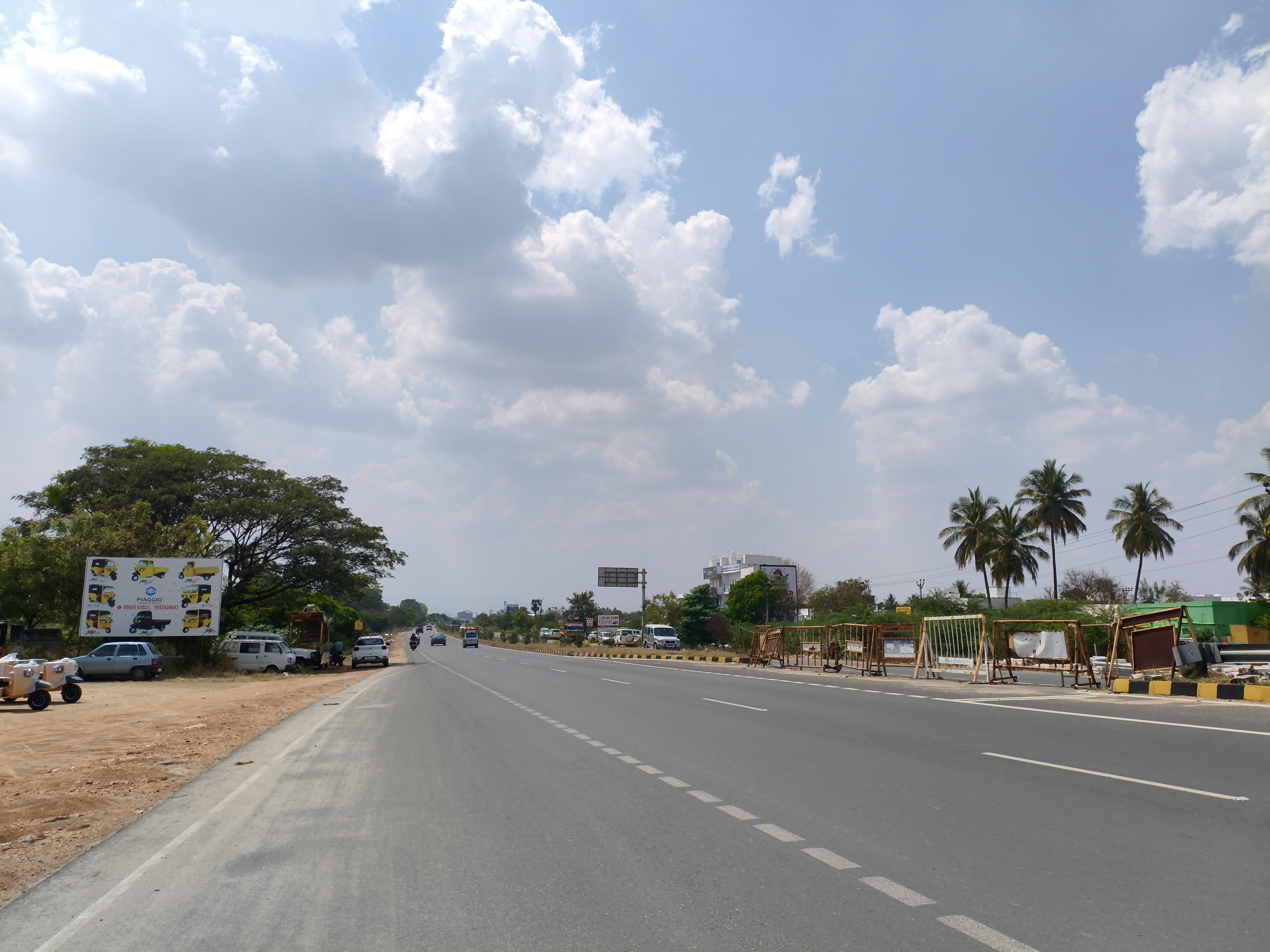
Nandavanampatti

== Demographics ==
As per the 2001 census, Nandavanampatti had a total population of 1895 with 962 males and 933 females. The sex ratio was 970. The literacy rate was 66.79.
