= Semmeninathar Karumbeswarar Temple =

Shiva temple in Tamil Nadu, India

Semmeninathar Karumbeswarar Temple is a Hindu temple located near Vishnampettai in the Thanjavur district of Tamil Nadu, India. The temple is dedicated to Shiva.

== Mythology ==
According to Hindu mythology, the mythical Brahmin sage Parasurama worshipped Shiva at this place to get rid of the sin of killing Kshatriyas. The place is also associated with legends of the Chola king Karikala.

== Significance ==
Praises of the temple have been sung by the Saivite saints Sambandar and Thirunavukkarasar.
