= Pudupatti =

Pudupatti may refer to:

- Pudupatti, Thanjavur
- Pudupatti, Tirunelveli
- Pudupatti, Virudhunagar
- R. Pudupatti, Namakkal
- W. Pudupatti, Virudhunagar

== See also ==
- Pudupattinam (disambiguation)
