= Ranganathapuram =

Neighbourhood in Thanjavur district, Tamil Nadu, India

- Neighbourhood
- Ranganathapuram, Thanjavur, Tamil Nadu
- Coordinates: 10.8335°N 78.9332°E
- Country: India
- State: Tamil Nadu
- District: Thanjavur
- Elevation: 76.73 m (251.7 ft)

Population (2011)
  - Total: 572

Languages
  - Official: Tamil
  - Speech: Tamil
- Time zone: UTC+5:30 (IST)
- PIN: 613104
- Vehicle registration: TN 49 ** xxxx
- Other Neighbourhoods: Thirukattupalli, Elangadu
- LS: Thanjavur
- VS: Tiruvaiyaru

Ranganathapuram is a village in the Thiruvaiyaru taluk of Thanjavur district, Tamil Nadu in India. It is located at about 2 km from Agarapettai and about 2 km from Thirukattupalli. The village is famous for the Tiruvaneshwar Temple.

== Location ==
Ranganathapuram (Tamil Nadu)

== Population ==
According to the 2001 census, the village had a population of 528 with 279 men and 249 women in 127 households. The sex ratio was 0.892. The literacy rate was 81.09.

As per 2011 census of India, the total population of Ranganathapuram village was 572, out of which males were 308 and females were 264.
