= Avarampatti =

- village
- Location in Tamil Nadu, India Avarampatti (India)
- Coordinates: 10°45′29″N 78°57′48″E
- Country: India
- State: Tamil Nadu
- District: Thanjavur
- PIN Code: 613602

Population (2011)
  - Total: 1,414

Languages
  - Official: Tamil
- Time zone: UTC+5:30 (IST)
- Postal code: 613602
- Vehicle registration: TN 49

Avarampatti is a village in the Thanjavur taluk of Thanjavur district, Tamil Nadu.

== Demographics ==
As per the 2011 census, Avarampatti had a total population of 1414 with 709 males and 705 females. The sex ratio was 994. The literacy rate was 86.07%.

== Geography ==
Avarampatti is located on the way between two middle level towns Budalur and Sengipatti. It is 4 kilometers away from Budalur, which is connected through rail routes between Thanjavur and Tiruchirapalli.

== Religion ==
Avarampaati is a Hindu dominated village; 90% of the population are Hindus and 10% Christians. Prominent temples in Avarampatti are

- Bhagavathi amman temple.
- Pillaiyar kovil(Lord Ganesha temple)
- Thayalnayaki Amman kovil
