= Perumbur IInd Sethi =

- village
- Country: India
- State: Tamil Nadu
- District: Thanjavur
- Taluk: Thanjavur

Population (2001)
  - Total: 1,316

Languages
  - Official: Tamil
- Time zone: UTC+5:30 (IST)

Perumbur IInd Sethi is a village in the Thanjavur taluk of Thanjavur district, Tamil Nadu, India.

== Demographics ==
As per the 2001 census, Perumbur IInd Sethi had a total population of 1316 with 644 males and 672 females. The sex ratio was 1043. The literacy rate was 76.42.
