= Rayanthur =

- village
- Country: India
- State: Tamil Nadu
- District: Thanjavur
- Taluk: Thanjavur

Population (2001)
  - Total: 1,857

Languages
  - Official: Tamil
- Time zone: UTC+5:30 (IST)

Rayanthur is a village in the Thanjavur taluk of Thanjavur district, Tamil Nadu, India.

== Demographics ==
As per the 2001 census, Rayanthur had a total population of 1857 with 914 males and 943 females. The sex ratio was 1032. The literacy rate was 77.49.
