= Melachittakadu =

- village
- Country: India
- State: Tamil Nadu
- District: Thanjavur
- Taluk: Thanjavur

Population (2001)
  - Total: 546

Languages
  - Official: Tamil
- Time zone: UTC+5:30 (IST)

Melachittakadu is a village in the Thanjavur taluk of Thanjavur district, Tamil Nadu, India.

== Demographics ==
As per the 2001 census, Melachittakadu had a total population of 546 with 275 males and 271 females. The sex ratio was 985. The literacy rate was 62.6.
