= Palliyeri =

Coordinates: 10°49′N 79°07′E

- village
- Interactive map of Palliyeri
- Country: India
- State: Tamil Nadu
- District: Thanjavur
- Taluk: Thanjavur

Population (2001)
  - Total: 1,039

Languages
  - Official: Tamil
- Time zone: UTC+5:30 (IST)
- Postal code: 613002

Palliyeri is a village in the Thanjavur taluk of Thanjavur district, Tamil Nadu, India.

== Demographics ==
As per the 2001 census, Palliyeri had a total population of 1039 with 514 males and 525 females. The sex ratio was 1021. The literacy rate was 74.32.
