= Thandangorai =

- village
- Country: India
- State: Tamil Nadu
- District: Thanjavur
- Taluk: Thanjavur

Population (2001)
  - Total: 941

Languages
  - Official: Tamil
- Time zone: UTC+5:30 (IST)

Thandangorai is a village in the Thanjavur taluk of Thanjavur district, Tamil Nadu, India.

== Demographics ==
As per the 2001 census, Thandangorai had a total population of 941 with 472 males and 469 females. The sex ratio was 994. The literacy rate was 68.33.
