= Rayamundanpatti =

Coordinates: 10°46′N 78°54′E

- village
- Interactive map of Rayamundanpatti
- Country: India
- State: Tamil Nadu
- District: Thanjavur
- Taluk: Thanjavur

Population (2001)
  - Total: 1,413

Languages
  - Official: Tamil
- Time zone: UTC+5:30 (IST)
- Postal code: 614402

Rayamundanpatti is a village in the Thanjavur taluk of Thanjavur district, Tamil Nadu, India.

== Demographics ==
As per the 2001 census, Rayamundanpatti had a total population of 1413 with 711 males and 702 females. The sex ratio was 987. The literacy rate was 55.28.
