= Vilar, Thanjavur =

Coordinates: 10°44′N 79°09′E

Vilar Vilaar
- village
- Interactive map of Vilar
- Country: India
- State: Tamil Nadu
- District: Thanjavur
- Taluk: Thanjavur

Population (2001)
  - Total: 5,628

Languages
  - Official: Tamil
- Time zone: UTC+5:30 (IST)
- Postal code: 613006

Vilar is a panchayat town in Thanjavur taluk of the Thanjavur district in Tamil Nadu, India. The town is situated near the village Kandidhampattu.

== Industry ==
The primary industry in Vilar is farming, mostly consisting of small farmers. Major crops include cashew and groundnut. During the 1967 drought, the people of Vilar were affected to the greatest extent as it was predominantly a dry area. In recent days Vilar has become a very fertile area, thanks to the rise in ground water by motor pumps.

== Demographics ==
As per the 2001 census, Vilar had a total population of 5628 with 2885 males and 2743 females. The sex ratio was 951. The literacy rate was 55.82%.

== Memorial ==
The war memorial Mullivaikal Muttram, spread out on a 1.75-acre plot at Vilar, is built by Tamil nationalist leader Pazha Nedumaran of the World Tamil Confederation Trust and M. Natarajan, editor of Tamil Arasi and Puthiyaparvai.
