= Kurungulam Keelpathi =

Kurungulam KeelpathI
- village
- Nickname: kurungulam Village
- Country: India
- State: Tamil Nadu
- District: Thanjavur
- Taluk: Thanjavur
- Founder: King Rajaraja cholan

Government
  - Panchayat President: Anuradha

Population (2001)
  - Total: 3,460

Languages Tamil English
  - Official: Tamil
- Time zone: UTC+5:30 (IST)

Kurungulam Keelpathi is a village in the Thanjavur taluk of Thanjavur district, Tamil Nadu, India.

== Demographics ==
As per the 2001 census, Kurungulam Keelpathi had a total population of 3460 with 1689 males and 1771 females. The sex ratio was 1049. The literacy rate was 55.79.
