= Kulichapattu =

Kulichappattu
- village
- Location in Tamil Nadu, India Kulichappattu (India)
- Coordinates: 10.7674°N 79.1950°E
- Country: India
- State: Tamil Nadu
- District: Thanjavur
- Taluk: Thanjavur

Population (2001)
  - Total: 1,774

Languages
  - Official: Tamil
- Time zone: UTC+5:30 (IST)
- PIN: 613501
- Vehicle registration: TN 49

Kulichappattu is a village in the Thanjavur taluk of Thanjavur district, Tamil Nadu, India.

== Demographics ==
As per the 2001 census, Kulichapattu had a total population of 1774 with 860 males and 914 females. The sex ratio was 1063. The literacy rate was 66.12.

== Location ==
Located in south east direction of Thanjavur town about 10 km away. Nearby town is Mariamman Kovil (Punnainallur), around 4 km. Kulichapattu is situated between NH67 and SH63. Can be reached in 10 minutes by bike/car from PRIST University east campus. Sameway can be reached in 10–15 minutes by bike/car from Mariamman Kovil.
