= Marudakkudi =

Coordinates: 10°45′N 79°00′E

- village
- Interactive map of Marudakkudi
- Country: India
- State: Tamil Nadu
- District: Thanjavur
- Taluk: Thanjavur

Population (2001)
  - Total: 2,010

Languages
  - Official: Tamil
- Time zone: UTC+5:30 (IST)

Marudakkudi is a village in the Thanjavur taluk of Thanjavur district, Tamil Nadu, India.

== Demographics ==
As per the 2001 census, Marudakkudi had a total population of 2010 with 1017 males and 993 females. The sex ratio was 976. The literacy rate was 74.41.
