= Nanjikottai Vallundanpattu =

Nanjikottai Vengarayan Vengarayan
- village
- Nickname: vengai
- Country: India
- State: Tamil Nadu
- District: Thanjavur
- Taluk: Thanjavur

Population (2001)
  - Total: 2,299

Languages
  - Official: Tamil
- Time zone: UTC+5:30 (IST)

Nanjikottai Vengarayan is a village in the Thanjavur taluk of Thanjavur district, Tamil Nadu, India.

== Demographics ==
As per the 2001 census, Nanjikottai Vengarayan kudi kaddu had a total population of 2298 with 1156 males and 1143 females. The sex ratio was 989. The literacy rate was 69.67.
