= Palaiyapatti Vadakkusethi =

Village in Tamil Nadu, India

- village
- Interactive map of Palaiyapatti Vadakkusethi
- Coordinates: 10.707°N 78.918°E
- Country: India
- State: Tamil Nadu
- District: Thanjavur
- Taluk: Thanjavur

Population (2001)
  - Total: 2,184

Languages
  - Official: Tamil
- Time zone: UTC+5:30 (IST)

Palaiyapatti Vadakkusethi is a village in the Thanjavur taluk of Thanjavur district, Tamil Nadu, India.

== Demographics ==
As per the 2001 census, Palaiyapatti Vadakkusethi had a total population of 2184 with 1129 males and 1055 females. The sex ratio was 934. The literacy rate was 37.15.
