= Madigai =

Coordinates: 10°43′N 79°13′E

- village
- Interactive map of Madigai
- Country: India
- State: Tamil Nadu
- District: Thanjavur
- Taluk: Thanjavur

Population (2001)
  - Total: 2,067

Languages
  - Official: Tamil
- Time zone: UTC+5:30 (IST)

Madigai is a village in the Thanjavur taluk of Thanjavur district, Tamil Nadu, India.

== Demographics ==
As per the 2001 census, Madigai had a total population of 2067 with 1026 males and 1041 females. The sex ratio was 1015. The literacy rate was 71.3.
