= Thirukanurpatti =

Thirukkanurpatti thiru kavaloor
- village
- Country: India
- State: Tamil Nadu
- District: Thanjavur
- Taluk: Thanjavur

Government
  - Body: panchayat

Population (2011)
  - Total: 4,883

Languages
  - Official: Tamil
- Time zone: UTC+5:30 (IST)
- PIN: 613303

Thirukanurpatti is a village in the Thanjavur taluk of Thanjavur district, Tamil Nadu, India.

== Demographics ==
As per the 2001 census, Thirukanurpatti had a total population of 4003 with 1999 males and 2004 females. The sex ratio was 1003. The literacy rate was 64.18.
