= Siralur =

Coordinates: 10°49′N 79°05′E

Seeralur
- village
- Interactive map of Seeralur
- Country: India
- State: Tamil Nadu
- District: Thanjavur
- Taluk: Thanjavur

Government
  - Panchayat President: Senthil Kumar

Population (2001)
  - Total: 541

Languages
  - Official: Tamil
- Time zone: UTC+5:30 (IST)

Seeralur is a village in the Thanjavur taluk of Thanjavur district, Tamil Nadu, India.

== Demographics ==
As per the 2001 census, Siralur had a total population of 541 - 275 males and 266 females. The literacy rate was 84.91%. Siralur is about 8 km west of Thanjavur. The village is surrounded by paddy fields. The village has a Pachayat office, primary school and a library.
