= Durai Chandrasekaran =

Indian politician

D. Chandrasekaran
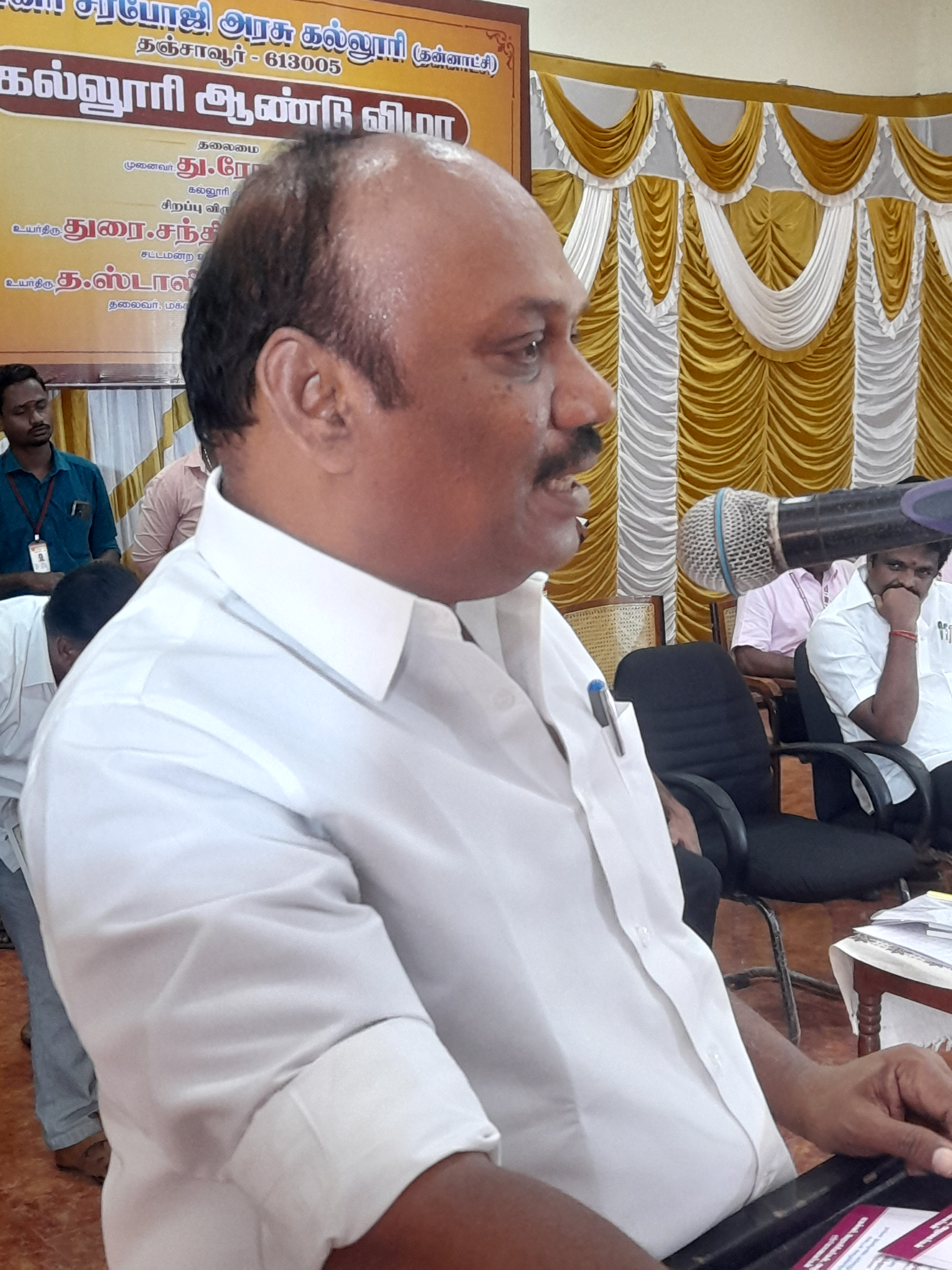
- Durai Chandrasekaran. 2021

Member of the Madras State Assembly
- Incumbent
- Assumed office 2016
- Constituency: Tiruvaiyaru

Assembly Member for Tiruvaiyaru
- In office 2006-2011
- In office 1996–2001
- In office 1989–1991

Personal details
- Born: Durai Chandrasekaran; 7 June 1959 (age 67) Thiruvayaru, Thanjavur district, Tamil Nadu India
- Party: Dravida Munnetra Kazhagam
- Occupation: Politician

Durai Chandrasekaran is an Indian politician and incumbent Member of the Legislative Assembly of Tamil Nadu. He was elected four times to the Tamil Nadu legislative assembly as a Dravida Munnetra Kazhagam candidate from Tiruvaiyaru constituency in the 1989, 1996, 2006 and 2016 elections. He lost the seat to P. Kaliyaperumal of the All India Anna Dravida Munnetra Kazhagam (AIADMK) in the 1991 election and to K. Ayyaru Vandayar of the same party in 2001.

== Electoral performance ==
2021 Tamil Nadu Legislative Assembly election: Tiruvaiyaru
Party	Candidate	Votes	%	±%
DMK	Durai Chandrasekaran	103,210	49.09	−0.19
BJP	S. Venkatesan	49,560	23.57	New
AMMK	V. Karthikeyan	37,469	17.82	New
NTK	D. Senthilnathan	15,820	7.52	+6.63
PT	G. Uthirapathi	1,215	0.58	New
NOTA	NOTA	1,180	0.56	−0.42
Independent	P. S. Thirumaran	1,093	0.52	New
Margin of victory		53,650	25.52	18.45
Turnout		210,250	78.35	−3.49
Rejected ballots		539	0.26	
Registered electors		268,353		
DMK hold		Swing	-0.19	

2016 Tamil Nadu Legislative Assembly election: Tiruvaiyaru
Party	Candidate	Votes	%	±%
DMK	Durai Chandrasekaran	100,043	49.27	+5.63
AIADMK	M. G. M. Subramanian	85,700	42.21	−8.9
CPI(M)	V. Jeevakumar	8,604	4.24	New
NOTA	NOTA	1,987	0.98	New
NTK	K. R. Shanmugham	1,806	0.89	New
PMK	R. Kanakaraj	1,571	0.77	New
TMMK	T. Kamaraj	1,161	0.57	New
IJK	S. Simiyon Xavier Raj	1,072	0.53	New
Margin of victory		14,343	7.06	−0.40
Turnout		203,030	81.84	−1.94
Registered electors		248,086		
DMK gain from AIADMK		Swing	-1.84	

2006 Tamil Nadu Legislative Assembly election: Tiruvaiyaru
Party	Candidate	Votes	%	±%
DMK	Durai Chandrasekaran	52,723	45.89	+6.59
AIADMK	Durai. Govindarajan	52,357	45.57	−9.18
DMDK	N. Mahendran	6,420	5.59	New
BJP	C. Kumaravelu	1,246	1.08	New
BSP	T. Suresh	868	0.76	New
Independent	K. Rajesh	688	0.60	New
Independent	A. Mathiazhagan	596	0.52	New
Margin of victory		366	0.32	−15.14
Turnout		114,898	76.62	11.80
Registered electors		149,967		
DMK gain from AIADMK		Swing	-8.86	

2001 Tamil Nadu Legislative Assembly election: Tiruvaiyaru
Party	Candidate	Votes	%	±%
AIADMK	K. Ayyaru Vandayar	55,579	54.75	+24.92
DMK	Durai Chandrasekaran	39,890	39.29	−17.02
MDMK	R. Madhiyazhagan	3,420	3.37	New
Independent	U. Vijayan	1,491	1.47	New
Independent	M. Chandrasekaran	636	0.63	New
Margin of victory		15,689	15.45	−11.03
Turnout		101,519	64.81	−8.69
Registered electors		156,668		
AIADMK gain from DMK		Swing	-1.57	

1996 Tamil Nadu Legislative Assembly election: Tiruvaiyaru
Party	Candidate	Votes	%	±%
DMK	Durai Chandrasekaran	57,429	56.32	+17.76
AIADMK	M. Subramanian	30,418	29.83	−29.85
CPI(M)	V. Jeevakumar	9,489	9.31	New
Independent	J. Vasuki Jayaraman	2,551	2.50	New
BJP	J. Sivakumar	826	0.81	New
Margin of victory		27,011	26.49	5.37
Turnout		101,974	73.50	5.18
Registered electors		145,062		
DMK gain from AIADMK		Swing	-3.36	

1991 Tamil Nadu Legislative Assembly election: Tiruvaiyaru
Party	Candidate	Votes	%	±%
AIADMK	P. Kalaiperumal	57,648	59.68	+45.77
DMK	Durai Chandrasekaran	37,249	38.56	+0.28
PMK	A. R. Govindasamy	1,037	1.07	New
Margin of victory		20,399	21.12	10.10
Turnout		96,598	68.32	−8.67
Registered electors		145,334		
AIADMK gain from DMK		Swing	21.40	

1989 Tamil Nadu Legislative Assembly election: Tiruvaiyaru
Party	Candidate	Votes	%	±%
DMK	Durai Chandrasekaran	36,981	38.28	New
Independent	Sivaji Ganesan	26,338	27.26	New
INC	P. Arumugahonnamundar	14,346	14.85	New
AIADMK	Ko. Maruthaiyan Azhi	13,435	13.91	−41.84
Independent	M. Solomon Raj	2,457	2.54	New
Independent	Pazhanimanickam Ka	1,536	1.59	New
Independent	Ramaiyan Muthu	509	0.53	New
Independent	P. Maradhaiyan	497	0.51	New
Margin of victory		10,643	11.02	−4.52
Turnout		96,617	76.99	−1.38
Registered electors		127,844		
DMK gain from AIADMK		Swing	-17.47	
