= Kullangarai =

Kollangarai
- village
- Country: India
- State: Tamil Nadu
- District: Thanjavur
- Taluk: Thanjavur

Population (2001)
  - Total: 2,261

Languages
  - Official: Tamil
- Time zone: UTC+5:30 (IST)

Kullangarai is a village in the Thanjavur taluk of Thanjavur district, Tamil Nadu, India.

== Demographics ==
As per the 2001 census, Kollangarai had a total population of 2061 with 1096 males and 1165 females. The sex ratio was 1063. The literacy rate was 59.98.
