= Vasishteswarar Temple, Thittai =

Hindu temple in Tamil Nadu, India

Thittai Vasishteswarar Temple
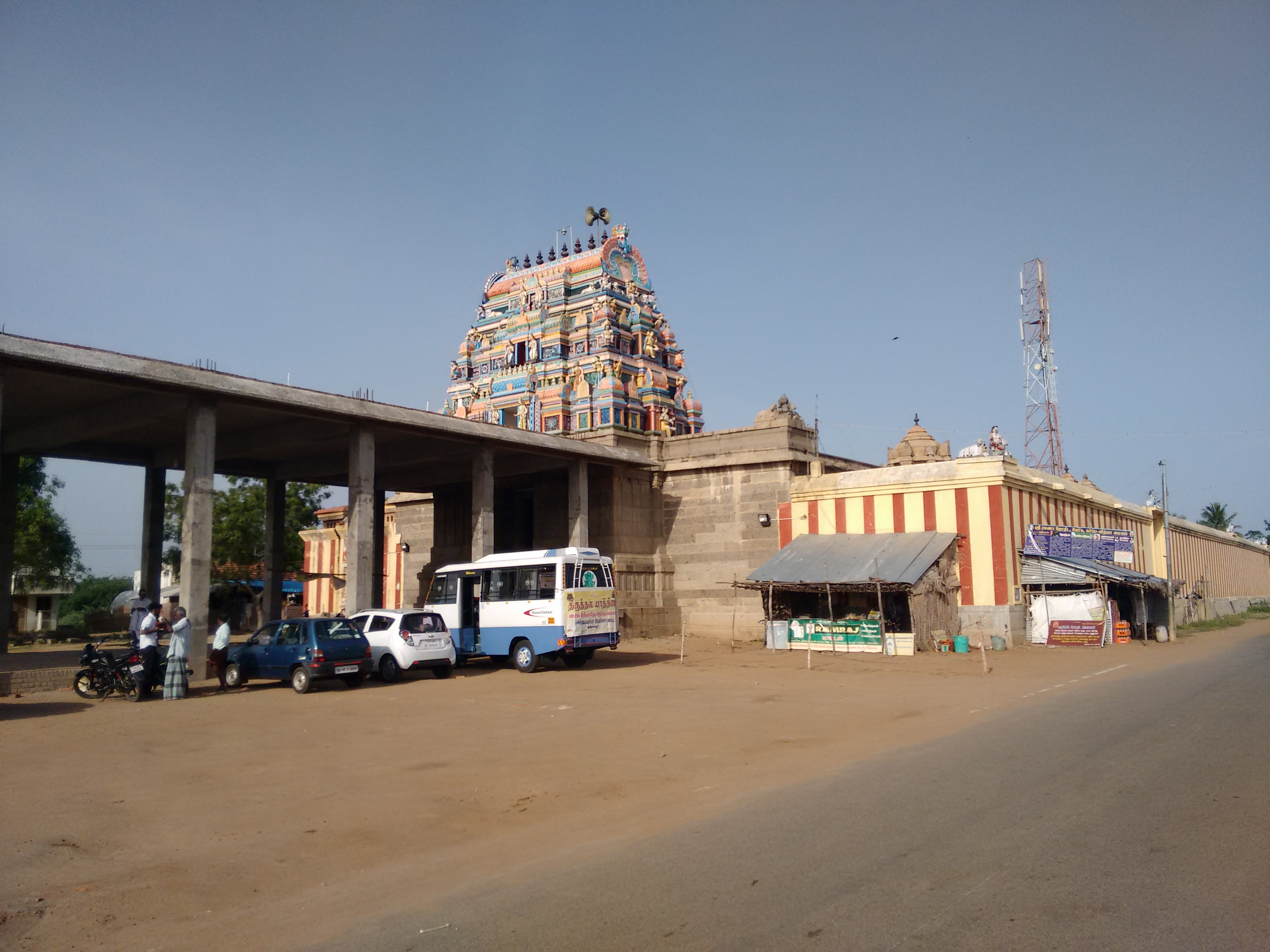
- Temple entrance

- Location in Tamil Nadu

Religion
- Affiliation: Hinduism
- District: Thanjavur District
- Deity: Vasishteswarar (Shiva), Ulaganayaki (Parvathi)

Location
- Location: Thanjavur, Tamil Nadu, India
- State: Tamil Nadu
- Country: India
- Coordinates: 10°53′49″N 79°7′48″E

Architecture
- Type: Tamil architecture

Vasishteswarar Temple, located in the village of Thittai, is a Hindu temple dedicated to Lord Shiva. The temple is located 11 kilometers north of Thanjavur city in the South Indian state of Tamil Nadu. Constructed by the Chola empire, it dates back to the 12th century AD.

== Description ==
Vasishteswarar temple is situated in the village of Thittai near Thanjavur. As the village is situated south of the Cauvery river, it is also called Thenkudi Thittai.

The presiding deity in the temple is Lord Swayambootheswarar (Shiva) along with his consort, Goddess Ulaganayaki (Parvati). Saint Vasishtar is said to have worshipped the deity in this temple. Hence, the deity is known as Lord Vasishteswarar.

This 1000-year-old temple is said to have been built by the Chola empire. The temple faces the east direction with a temple tank in front of it. Unlike many other temples, here the complete temple is built using stone. Not only for the main deities, but also all other sannidhi's are constructed using stones, right from floors, pillars, walls and roof.

The temple is one of the shrines of the 275 Paadal Petra Sthalams. It was glorified in the early medieval Tevaram poems by Tamil Saivite Nayanars Tirugnanasambandar and Thirunavukkarasar.

== Uniqueness ==
It is believed that in this temple, a drop of water falls on the Shiva linga every 24 minutes from the ceiling. This is because of the presence of a special stone called Chandrakanth kept on the roof. This stone absorbs moisture from the surrounding air and converts it into drops of water. The temple attracts huge crowds due to this speciality.

Another speciality of this temple is that Lord Brihaspati, who is worshipped as Guru Bhagavan, has a separate sanctum with a separate vimana inside the temple complex. This is the only place where one can see Guru Bhagavan in standing posture with four hands, holding weapons and a book. Chitra Pournami and Guru Peyarchi are the most important festivals of the temple.

== Legend ==
In the Tamil language, 'thittai' means mound. Once, when Pralaya occurred, there was destruction all over the world. Lord Brahma and Vishnu worshipped Lord Shiva for protection. After searching for a safe place, they found this only mound, which did not get destroyed by the Pralaya. There was a Shiva Lingam on the mound.

They performed puja to the Lingam and worshipped Lord Shiva, who appeared before them and delegated their duties of creation and protection.
