= Thottakadu, Thanjavur =

Thottakadu
- village
- Country: India
- State: Tamil Nadu
- District: Thanjavur
- Taluk: Thanjavur

Population (2001)
  - Total: 1,623

Languages
  - Official: Tamil
- Time zone: UTC+5:30 (IST)

Thottakadu is a village in the Thanjavur taluk of Thanjavur district, Tamil Nadu, India. The village is given importance for agriculture and it is located beside of Vettaru River. The majority of the people is doing agriculture.

== Demographics ==
As per the 2001 census, Thottakadu had a total population of 1623 with 819 males and 804 females. The sex ratio was 982. The literacy rate was 82.43.
