= Valamirankottai =

Coordinates: 10°45′N 79°13′E

- village
- Interactive map of Valamirankottai
- Country: India
- State: Tamil Nadu
- District: Thanjavur
- Taluk: Thanjavur

Population (2001)
  - Total: 1,252

Languages
  - Official: Tamil
- Time zone: UTC+5:30 (IST)

Valamirankottai is a village in the Thanjavur taluk of Thanjavur district, Tamil Nadu, India.

== Origin of the Name ==
- The name comes from Rajaraja cholan history. One time he visited this place, and he saw a small lake. He removed the sword and kept it in under a tree. After drinking the water, when he attempted to take the sword, he was unable to take it back. At that time, he saw the God Sivan over the tree. So, he created a Sivan temple and named the sword sit port, in Tamil Valamirankottai (Vaal amarndha kottai) It has spread by word of mouth.

== Demographics ==
At the 2001 census, Valamirankottai had a total population of 1623 with 638 males and 614 females. The sex ratio was 962. The literacy rate was 71.06.
