= Vennalodai =

Coordinates: 10°49′N 79°06′E

- village
- Interactive map of Vennalodai
- Country: India
- State: Tamil Nadu
- District: Thanjavur
- Taluk: Thanjavur

Population (2001)
  - Total: 454

Languages
  - Official: Tamil
- Time zone: UTC+5:30 (IST)

Vennalodai is a village in the Thanjavur taluk of Thanjavur district, Tamil Nadu, India.

== Demographics ==
As per the 2001 census, Vennalodai had a total population of 454 with 227 males and 227 females. The sex ratio was 1000. The literacy rate was 55.82.
