= Surakudipatti =

- village
- Country: India
- State: Tamil Nadu
- District: Thanjavur
- Taluk: Thanjavur

Population (2001)
  - Total: 823

Languages
  - Official: Tamil
- Time zone: UTC+5:30 (IST)

Surakudipatti is a village in the Thanjavur taluk of Thanjavur district, Tamil Nadu, India.

== Demographics ==
As per the 2001 census, Surakudipatti had a total population of 823 with 395 males and 428 females. The literacy rate was 59.09.
