= Melavelithottam =

- village
- Country: India
- State: Tamil Nadu
- District: Thanjavur
- Taluk: Thanjavur

Population (2001)
  - Total: 8,081

Languages
  - Official: Tamil
- Time zone: UTC+5:30 (IST)

Melavelithottam is a village in the Thanjavur taluk of Thanjavur district, Tamil Nadu, India.

== Demographics ==
As per the 2001 census, Melavelithottam had a total population of 8081 with 4110 males and 3971 females. The sex ratio was 966. The literacy rate was 87.81.
