= Sakkarasamudram =

- village
- Country: India
- State: Tamil Nadu
- District: Thanjavur
- Taluk: Thanjavur

Population (2001)
  - Total: 2,076

Languages
  - Official: Tamil
- Time zone: UTC+5:30 (IST)

Sakkarasamudram is a village in the Thanjavur taluk of Thanjavur district, Tamil Nadu, India.

== Demographics ==
As per the 2001 census, Sakkarasamandram had a total population of 2076 with 1052 males and 1024 females. The sex ratio was 973. The literacy rate was 70.77.
