= G. Elangovan =

Indian politician

G. Elangovan is an Indian politician and former Member of the Legislative Assembly of Tamil Nadu. He was elected to the Tamil Nadu Legislative Assembly as a Dravida Munnetra Kazhagam candidate from Tiruvaiyaru constituency in 1971, and 1977 elections.
