= Marungulam =

Coordinates: 10°41′N 79°09′E

- village
- Nickname: vaaguyar nadu
- Interactive map of Marungulam
- Country: India
- State: Tamil Nadu
- District: Thanjavur
- Taluk: Thanjavur

Population (2001)
  - Total: 3,957

Languages
  - Official: Tamil
- Time zone: UTC+5:30 (IST)
- Postal code: 613006

Marungulam is a developing village in the Thanjavur taluk of Thanjavur district, Tamil Nadu, India.

== Demographics ==
As per the 2001 census, Marungulam had a total population of 3957, with 1989 males and 1968 females. The sex ratio was 989. The literacy rate was 66.73. Marungulam is a village in Thanjavur Taluk in Thanjavur District of Tamil Nadu, India. It is 16 km to the south of District headquarters Thanjavur, 11 km from Thanjavur, 342 km from State capital Chennai. Marungulam Pin code is 613006 and postal head office is Thanjavur P&t Colony. Nadur (5 km), Vadakkur North (5 km), Poyyundarkottai (6 km), Vilar (6 km), Inathukkanpatti (7 km) are the nearby villages to Marungulam. Marungulam is surrounded by Thanjavur Taluk to the north, Orattanadu Taluk to the east, Gandaravakottai Taluk to the west, Thiruvonam Taluk to the south. Nanjikottai, Thanjavur, Pattukkottai, Lalgudi are the nearby cities to Marungulam. This place is in the border of the Thanjavur District and Ariyalur District. Ariyalur District Thirumanur is North towards this place. Demographics of Marungulam: Tamil is the local language here. Government primary health center here, Government horticulture farm, Government higher secondary school, Government primary school, Government agriculture college near by 3 km Echankottai village, Government marriage hall here .
