= Palaiyapatti Therkusethi =

- village
- Interactive map of Palaiyapatti Therkusethi
- Coordinates: 10.697°N 78.945°E
- Country: India
- State: Tamil Nadu
- District: Thanjavur
- Taluk: Thanjavur

Population (2001)
  - Total: 2,072

Languages
  - Official: Tamil
- Time zone: UTC+5:30 (IST)

Palaiyapatti Therkusethi is a village in the Thanjavur taluk of Thanjavur district, Tamil Nadu, India.

== Demographics ==
As per the 2001 census, Palaiyapatti Therkusethi had a total population of 2072 with 1015 males and 1057 females. The sex ratio was 1041. The literacy rate was 61.68.
