= Tiruvaneshwar Temple =

Hindu temple in Thanjavur district, Tamil Nadu, India

- Tiruvaneshwar Temple, Ranganathapuram, Thanjavur, Tamil Nadu

Religion
- Affiliation: Hinduism
- District: Thanjavur
- Deity: Gajaraneshwar, Tiruvaneshwar
- Festival: Maha Shivaratri

Location
- Location: Ranganathapuram
- State: Tamil Nadu
- Country: India
- Interactive map of Tiruvaneshwar Temple
- Coordinates: 10.8366°N 78.9349°E

Architecture
- Type: Dravidian architecture
- Creator: Kochengat Chollha
- Completed

Specifications
- Temple: One
- Elevation: 73.86 m (242 ft)

Tiruvaneshwar Temple is a Shiva temple located at Ranganathapuram in the Thiruvaiyaru taluk of Thanjavur district in Tamil Nadu. The temple is dedicated to Shiva.

== Location ==
Tiruvaneshwar temple is located with the coordinates of (10.8366°N 78.9349°E) at Ranganathapuram in Thiruvaiyaru Taluk

Tiruvaneshwar Temple (Tamil Nadu)

== Main deities ==
The main deity in this temple is Tiruvaneshwar. He is also called as Gajaranyeswar, Karivananathar, Aneswarar and Anaikaraperumanar and the goddess is Kamakshi Ambal.

== Importance ==
Chandrashekharendra Saraswati VIII, pontiff of Kanchi Kamakoti Peetham in his lifetime stayed here for a week, for meditation.

== Sub deities ==
Durga, Gajalakshmi, Brahma, Chandikeswarar, Valampuri Vinayaka, Subramanian with His consorts Valli and Devasena, Nandi and Navagraha are the sub deities in this temple.

== Maintenance ==
This temple is maintained under the control of Hindu Religious and Charitable Endowments Department, Government of Tamil Nadu.
