= Kotrapatti =

- village
- Country: India
- State: Tamil Nadu
- District: Thanjavur
- Taluk: Thanjavur

Population (2001)
  - Total: 741

Languages
  - Official: Tamil
- Time zone: UTC+5:30 (IST)

Kotrapatti is a village in the Thanjavur taluk of Thanjavur district, Tamil Nadu, India.

== Demographics ==
As per the 2001 census, Kotrapatti had a total population of 741 with 379 males and 362 females. The sex ratio was 955. The literacy rate was 75.08.
