= Pillaiyarmatham =

- village
- Country: India
- State: Tamil Nadu
- District: Thanjavur
- Taluk: Thanjavur

Population (2001)rise
  - Total: 1,876

தமிழ்
  - Official: Tamil
- Time zone: UTC+5:30 (IST)
- Postal code: 613601

Pillaiyarmatham is a village in the Thanjavur taluk of Thanjavur district, Tamil Nadu, India.

== Demographics ==
As per the 2001 census, Pillaiyarmatham had a total population of 1876 with 921 males and 955 females. The sex ratio was 1037. The literacy rate was 77.34.
