= Muthuveerakandiampatti =

- village
- Country: India
- State: Tamil Nadu
- District: Thanjavur
- Taluk: Thanjavur

Population (2001)
  - Total: 1,014

Languages
  - Official: Tamil
- Time zone: UTC+5:30 (IST)

Muthuveerakandiampatti is a village in the Thanjavur taluk of Thanjavur district, Tamil Nadu, India.

== Demographics ==
At the 2011 census, Muthuveerakandiampatti had a total population of 1,062(528 males and 534 females) The sex ratio (number of males per 1000 females in this context) was 1011. The literacy rate was 71.19%. These figures have changed from the 2001 census, with there now being a higher number of females than males, and the literacy rate going down slightly.
