= Vishnampettai =

Coordinates: 10°52′N 78°57′E

Vishnampettai is a large village in Budalur block, Thiruvaiyaru taluk of Thanjavur district, Tamil Nadu. This village is located in the banks of Kaveri River, Kollidam River and Kudamurutti River.

== Demographics ==
The total geographical area of Vishnampettai is 607.52hectares. The population of the village is 2655 in which 1314 are male and 1341 are female. The literacy rate of the village is 73.12%.

One of the most notable person is V Ramanathan. He helped develop the archaeological sites and temples in his village. V Ramanathan died on July 10, 2007. The temple is now run on his name and yearly festivities are arranged on Vinayaka Chaturthi day.

== Notable people ==
- V.S. Venkataraman: Former Additional Secretary Commerce Ministry and also First PA to former Prime Minister Lal Bahadur Shastri. And Avinash Rajendran Advocate

== Transportation and education ==
=== Nearest railway stations ===
- Budalur Railway station-9 km away
- Alakkudi Railway station-14.5 km away
- Lalgudi Railway station-14.8 km away

=== Nearest airports ===
- Thanjavur Air force station-22.7 km away
- Tiruchirappalli International Airport-28.1 km away
- Karaikal Airport-97.5 km away

=== Schools nearby ===
- Lourdu Xavier Matric Higher Secondary School-0.9 km
- Sacred Heart F.Lawrence Higher Secondary school-2.6 km
- Mettur School-9.2 km
- Sir Sivaswamy Iyer Higher Secondery school, Thirukattupallii-centurian school
