= Perumbur Ist Sethi =

- village
- Country: India
- State: Tamil Nadu
- District: Thanjavur
- Taluk: Thanjavur

Population (2001)
  - Total: 2,353

Languages
  - Official: Tamil
- Time zone: UTC+5:30 (IST)

Perumbur Ist Sethi is a village in the Thanjavur taluk of Thanjavur district, Tamil Nadu, India.

== Demographics ==
Per the 2001 census, Perumbur Ist Sethi had a total population of 2353 with 1146 males and 1207 females. The sex ratio was 1053. The literacy rate was 69.68.
