= Kurungalur =

- village
- Country: India
- State: Tamil Nadu
- District: Thanjavur
- Taluk: Thanjavur

Population (2001)
  - Total: 1,120

Languages
  - Official: Tamil
- Time zone: UTC+5:30 (IST)

Kurungalur is a village in the Thanjavur taluk of Thanjavur district, Tamil Nadu, India.

== Demographics ==
As per the 2001 census, Kurungalur had a total population of 1120 with 568 males and 558 females. The sex ratio was 972. The literacy rate was 76.9.
