= M. Rethinasamy =

Indian politician

M. Rethinasamy is an Indian politician and incumbent member of the Tamil Nadu Legislative Assembly from the Tiruvaiyaru constituency. He represents the All India Anna Dravida Munnetra Kazhagam party.
