= Sellappanpettai =

Sellappanpettai sellappettai
- village
- Country: India
- State: Tamil Nadu
- District: Thanjavur
- Taluk: Thanjavur

Population (2001)
  - Total: 1,540

Languages
  - Official: Tamil
- Time zone: UTC+5:30 (IST)

Sellappanpettai is a village in the Thanjavur taluk of Thanjavur district, Tamil Nadu, India.

== Demographics ==
As per the 2001 census, Sellappanpettai had a total population of 1540 with 762 males and 778 females. The sex ratio was 1021. The literacy rate was 61.54.
