= Thittai =

Coordinates: 10.8970°N 79.1300°E

Thittai Thiruthenkudi Thittai
- village
- Interactive map of Thittai
- Country: India
- State: Tamil Nadu
- District: Thanjavur
- Taluk: Thanjavur

Government
  - Type: Panchayati raj (India)
  - Body: Gram panchayat
  - Panchayat President: Mangaiyarkarasi p

Population (2001)
  - Total: 1,105

Languages
  - Official: Tamil
- Time zone: UTC+5:30 (IST)
- Postal code: 613003

Thittai also known as Thengudi Thittai is a village located in the Thanjavur taluk of Thanjavur district, in the state of Tamil Nadu, India.The village is renowned for its ancient Vasishteswarar Temple, an important center of Hindu worship and Dravidian architecture.

== Geography and administration ==
Thittai is situated approximately 11 kilometers north of Thanjavur city, on the southern bank of the Cauvery River in southern India The village is governed by a Gram Panchayat under the Panchayati raj system, and falls within the Thanjavur Assembly and Parliament Constituency. The nearest urban center is Thanjavur, which serves as the main hub for economic and administrative activities in the region.

== Demographics ==
According to the 2011 Indian Census, Thittai has a population of approximately 1,163 people, with 559 males and 604 females, distributed among about 295 households. The sex ratio was 1031.Earlier census data (2001) recorded a population of 1,105, indicating stable population trends over the decade. The village has a literacy rate of over 75% as per the 2001 census, and 81.47% as per the 2011 census, which is higher than the Tamil Nadu state average. The sex ratio is favorable, with more females than males in both censuses.

== History and culture ==
The most prominent feature of Thittai is the Vasishteswarar Temple, a Hindu temple dedicated to Lord Shiva, locally known as Vasishteswarar or Swayambootheswarar. The temple is believed to have been constructed during the 12th century CE by the Chola dynasty and later renovated by the Nayak rulers in the 16th century. The temple is a fine example of Dravidian architecture, with intricate stone carvings, a large gopuram, and a temple tank called Sivaganga. Major festivals celebrated at the temple include Maha Shivaratri, Navaratri, Panguni Uthiram, Chitra Pournami, and Guru Peyarchi, attracting devotees from across Tamil Nadu and beyond.

== Economy ==
Thittai's economy is primarily agrarian, with most residents engaged in agriculture and related activities. The proximity to Thanjavur city provides additional opportunities for trade and employment.

== Accessibility ==
Thittai is accessible by road from Thanjavur, located on the Thanjavur Melattur Road, about 10 – 11 km from the city center. Public buses and private vehicles serve the route, making the temple and village easily reachable for visitors and pilgrims
