= Pudukudi South =

- village
- Country: India
- State: Tamil Nadu
- District: Thanjavur
- Taluk: Thanjavur

Population (2001)
  - Total: 357

Languages
  - Official: Tamil
- Time zone: UTC+5:30 (IST)

Pudukudi South is a village in the Budalur taluk of Thanjavur district in the Indian state of Tamil Nadu.

== Demographics ==
As per the 2001 census, Pudukudi South had a total population of 357 with 175 males and 182 females. The sex ratio was 1040. The literacy rate was 63.23.

== See also ==
- Pudukudi North
