= Maickelpatti =

Neighbourhood in Thanjavur district, Tamil Nadu, India

Coordinates: 10°50′58″N 78°58′10″E

Maickelpatti is a village in the Budalur block of Thanjavur district, Tamil Nadu, India.
