= Manangorai =

Coordinates: 10°52′N 79°10′E

- village
- Interactive map of Manangorai
- Country: India
- State: Tamil Nadu
- District: Thanjavur
- Taluk: Thanjavur

Population (2001)
  - Total: 1,385

Languages
  - Official: Tamil
- Time zone: UTC+5:30 (IST)
- Postal code: 614206

Manangorai is a village in the Thanjavur taluk of Thanjavur district, Tamil Nadu, India. It is the only village inside Thanjavur to have an Engineering college.

== Demographics ==
As per the 2001 census, Manangorai had a total population of 1385 with 693 males and 692 females. The sex ratio was 999. The literacy rate was 82.92.
