= Soorakkottai =

- village
- Country: India
- State: Tamil Nadu
- District: Thanjavur
- Taluk: Thanjavur

Population (2001)
  - Total: 4,304

Languages
  - Official: Tamil
- Time zone: UTC+5:30 (IST)

Soorakkottai is a village in the Thanjavur taluk of Thanjavur district, Tamil Nadu, India. It is the birthplace of the famous Tamil actor Sivaji Ganesan.

== Demographics ==
As per the 2001 census, Soorakkottai had a total population of 4304 with 2182 males and 2122 females. The sex ratio was 97.3. The literacy rate was 73.6.
