= Pudukudi North =

- village
- Country: India
- State: Tamil Nadu
- District: Thanjavur
- Taluk: Thanjavur

Population (2001)
  - Total: 3,308

Languages
  - Official: Tamil
- Time zone: UTC+5:30 (IST)

Pudukudi North is a village in the Budalurtaluk of Thanjavur district, Tamil Nadu, India.

== Demographics ==
As per the 2001 census, Pudukudi North had a total population of 3308 with 1677 males and 1631 females. The sex ratio was 973. The literacy rate was 64.56.

== See also ==
- Pudukudi South
