= Sennampatti =

Coordinates: 12°08′N 78°23′E

- village
- Interactive map of Sennampatti
- Country: India
- State: Tamil Nadu
- District: Thanjavur
- Taluk: Thanjavur

Government
  - Panchayat President: p Rajinkandh altitude=

Population (2001)
  - Total: 1,319

Languages
  - Official: Tamil
- Time zone: UTC+5:30 (IST)
- PIN: 613403 area_telephone=

Sennampatti is a village in the Thanjavur taluk of Thanjavur district, Tamil Nadu, India.

== Demographics ==
As per the 2001 census, Sennampatti had a total population of 1319 with 630 males and 689 females. The sex ratio was 1094. The literacy rate was 51.25.

The panchayat president is p.rajinikanth.
