= Pudupatti, Thanjavur =

Pudupatti
- village
- Location in Tamil Nadu, India Pudupatti (India)
- Coordinates: 9°45′50″N 77°16′04″E
- Country: India
- State: Tamil Nadu
- District: Tanjore

Population (2001)
  - Total: 1,714

Languages
  - Official: Tamil
- Time zone: UTC+5:30 (IST)
- PIN: 613402
- Telephone code: 914362
- Vehicle registration: TN 49
- Sex ratio: 1.03 ♂/♀

Pudupatti is a panchayat village in Thanjavur district and sub-district in the Indian state of Tamil Nadu.

== Geography ==
It is located between Sengipatti and Budalur on Poondimadha basilica main road.

== History ==
In the last century it belongs to Koonampatti jameen. In the ancient period it was ruled by Cholas. There are numerous temples around this village that were built by cholas.

== Economy ==
The peoples main occupation is agriculture. Paddy, Groundnut, Gingelly, Sunflower, Sugarcane are the main cultivation.

== Administration ==
The Panchayat comprises Maathuraarpudukottai, Muthandipatti, Magilapuram, Aarampoondaanpatti and Chinnamuthandipatti villages. Now this village belongs to Tiruvaiyaaru constituency and Thanjavur district.

== Demographics ==
As of 2001 Pudupatti had a population of 1,714 in 363 households. Males constitute 66% of the population and females 34%. Pudupatti has an average literacy rate of 70%, higher than the national average of 59.5%: male literacy is 74%, and female literacy is 52%. In Pudupatti, 19% of the population is under 6 years of age.
