= Tiruvaiyaru Assembly constituency =

One of the 234 State Legislative Assembly Constituencies in Tamil Nadu, in India

Coordinates: 10°52′47.55″N 79°05′44.67″E

Tiruvaiyaru
- Constituency No. 173 for the Tamil Nadu Legislative Assembly

Constituency details
- Country: India
- Region: South India
- State: Tamil Nadu
- District: Thanjavur
- Lok Sabha constituency: Thanjavur
- Established: 1957
- Total electors: 2,58,597
- Reservation: None

Member of Legislative Assembly
- 17th Tamil Nadu Legislative Assembly
- Incumbent Durai. Chandrasekaran
- Party: DMK
- Alliance: SPA
- Elected year: 2026

Tiruvaiyaru is a state assembly constituency in Thanjavur district in Tamil Nadu. The constituency has been in existence since the 1957 election. Most successful party: DMK (eight times). It is one of the 234 State Legislative Assembly Constituencies in Tamil Nadu, in India.

== Members of Legislative Assembly ==
=== Madras State ===
Year	Winner	Party
1957	R. Swaminatha Merkondar	Indian National Congress
1962	Palani	Indian National Congress
1967	G. M. Sethurar	Dravida Munnetra Kazhagam

=== Tamil Nadu ===
Year	Winner	Party
1971	G. Elangovan	Dravida Munnetra Kazhagam
1977	G. Elangovan	Dravida Munnetra Kazhagam
1980	M. Subramanian	All India Anna Dravida Munnetra Kazhagam
1984	Durai Govindarajan	All India Anna Dravida Munnetra Kazhagam
1989	Durai Chandrasekaran	Dravida Munnetra Kazhagam
1991	P. Kalaiperumal	All India Anna Dravida Munnetra Kazhagam
1996	Durai Chandrasekaran	Dravida Munnetra Kazhagam
2001	K. Ayyaru Vandayar	All India Anna Dravida Munnetra Kazhagam
2006	Durai Chandrasekaran	Dravida Munnetra Kazhagam
2011	M. Rethinasamy	All India Anna Dravida Munnetra Kazhagam
2016	Durai. Chandrasekaran	Dravida Munnetra Kazhagam
2021	Durai. Chandrasekaran	Dravida Munnetra Kazhagam
2026	Durai. Chandrasekaran	Dravida Munnetra Kazhagam

== Election results ==
Vote share of winning candidates
2026	36.21%
2021	49.09%
2016	49.27%
2011	51.11%
2006	45.89%
2001	54.75%
1996	56.32%
1991	59.68%
1989	38.28%
1984	55.75%
1980	55.14%
1977	36.96%
1971	50.75%
1967	51.94%
1962	53.77%
1957	43.00%

=== 2026 ===
2026 Tamil Nadu Legislative Assembly election: Thiruvaiyaru
Party	Candidate	Votes	%	±%
DMK	Durai. Chandrasekaran	80,425	36.21	▼12.88
TVK	Mathi. Manikandan	71,870	32.36	New
AMMK	Velu. Karthikeyan	55,121	24.82	▲7.00
NTK	Durai. Senthilnathan	10,681	4.81	▼2.71
TVK	Vijaya Babu	1,130	0.51	New
NOTA	NOTA	948	0.43	▼0.13
Margin of victory		8,555	3.85	▼21.67
Turnout		2,22,111	85.89	▲7.54
Registered electors		2,58,597		▼9,756
DMK hold		Swing	▼12.88	

=== 2021 ===
2021 Tamil Nadu Legislative Assembly election: Tiruvaiyaru
Party	Candidate	Votes	%	±%
DMK	Durai Chandrasekaran	103,210	49.09	−0.19
BJP	S. Venkatesan	49,560	23.57	New
AMMK	V. Karthikeyan	37,469	17.82	New
NTK	D. Senthilnathan	15,820	7.52	+6.63
PT	G. Uthirapathi	1,215	0.58	New
NOTA	NOTA	1,180	0.56	−0.42
Independent	P. S. Thirumaran	1,093	0.52	New
Margin of victory		53,650	25.52	18.45
Turnout		210,250	78.35	−3.49
Rejected ballots		539	0.26	
Registered electors		268,353		
DMK hold		Swing	-0.19	

=== 2016 ===
2016 Tamil Nadu Legislative Assembly election: Tiruvaiyaru
Party	Candidate	Votes	%	±%
DMK	Durai Chandrasekaran	100,043	49.27	+5.63
AIADMK	M. G. M. Subramanian	85,700	42.21	−8.9
CPI(M)	V. Jeevakumar	8,604	4.24	New
NOTA	NOTA	1,987	0.98	New
NTK	K. R. Shanmugham	1,806	0.89	New
PMK	R. Kanakaraj	1,571	0.77	New
TMMK	T. Kamaraj	1,161	0.57	New
IJK	S. Simiyon Xavier Raj	1,072	0.53	New
Margin of victory		14,343	7.06	−0.40
Turnout		203,030	81.84	−1.94
Registered electors		248,086		
DMK gain from AIADMK		Swing	-1.84	

=== 2011 ===
2011 Tamil Nadu Legislative Assembly election: Tiruvaiyaru
Party	Candidate	Votes	%	±%
AIADMK	M. Rethinasami	88,784	51.11	+5.54
DMK	S. Aranganathan	75,822	43.65	−2.24
IJK	G. Muthukumar	4,879	2.81	New
AIJMK	D. Rajesh Kannan	1,408	0.81	New
BJP	J. Sivakumar	1,276	0.73	−0.35
BSP	M. Arangarajan	911	0.52	−0.23
Margin of victory		12,962	7.46	7.14
Turnout		173,706	83.78	7.17
Registered electors		207,331		
AIADMK gain from DMK		Swing	5.22	

=== 2006 ===
2006 Tamil Nadu Legislative Assembly election: Tiruvaiyaru
Party	Candidate	Votes	%	±%
DMK	Durai Chandrasekaran	52,723	45.89	+6.59
AIADMK	Durai. Govindarajan	52,357	45.57	−9.18
DMDK	N. Mahendran	6,420	5.59	New
BJP	C. Kumaravelu	1,246	1.08	New
BSP	T. Suresh	868	0.76	New
Independent	K. Rajesh	688	0.60	New
Independent	A. Mathiazhagan	596	0.52	New
Margin of victory		366	0.32	−15.14
Turnout		114,898	76.62	11.80
Registered electors		149,967		
DMK gain from AIADMK		Swing	-8.86	

=== 2001 ===
2001 Tamil Nadu Legislative Assembly election: Tiruvaiyaru
Party	Candidate	Votes	%	±%
AIADMK	K. Ayyaru Vandayar	55,579	54.75	+24.92
DMK	Durai Chandrasekaran	39,890	39.29	−17.02
MDMK	R. Madhiyazhagan	3,420	3.37	New
Independent	U. Vijayan	1,491	1.47	New
Independent	M. Chandrasekaran	636	0.63	New
Margin of victory		15,689	15.45	−11.03
Turnout		101,519	64.81	−8.69
Registered electors		156,668		
AIADMK gain from DMK		Swing	-1.57	

=== 1996 ===
1996 Tamil Nadu Legislative Assembly election: Tiruvaiyaru
Party	Candidate	Votes	%	±%
DMK	Durai Chandrasekaran	57,429	56.32	+17.76
AIADMK	M. Subramanian	30,418	29.83	−29.85
CPI(M)	V. Jeevakumar	9,489	9.31	New
Independent	J. Vasuki Jayaraman	2,551	2.50	New
BJP	J. Sivakumar	826	0.81	New
Margin of victory		27,011	26.49	5.37
Turnout		101,974	73.50	5.18
Registered electors		145,062		
DMK gain from AIADMK		Swing	-3.36	

=== 1991 ===
1991 Tamil Nadu Legislative Assembly election: Tiruvaiyaru
Party	Candidate	Votes	%	±%
AIADMK	P. Kalaiperumal	57,648	59.68	+45.77
DMK	Durai Chandrasekaran	37,249	38.56	+0.28
PMK	A. R. Govindasamy	1,037	1.07	New
Margin of victory		20,399	21.12	10.10
Turnout		96,598	68.32	−8.67
Registered electors		145,334		
AIADMK gain from DMK		Swing	21.40	

=== 1989 ===
1989 Tamil Nadu Legislative Assembly election: Tiruvaiyaru
Party	Candidate	Votes	%	±%
DMK	Durai Chandrasekaran	36,981	38.28	New
Independent	Sivaji Ganesan	26,338	27.26	New
INC	P. Arumugahonnamundar	14,346	14.85	New
AIADMK	Ko. Maruthaiyan Azhi	13,435	13.91	−41.84
Independent	M. Solomon Raj	2,457	2.54	New
Independent	Pazhanimanickam Ka	1,536	1.59	New
Independent	Ramaiyan Muthu	509	0.53	New
Independent	P. Maradhaiyan	497	0.51	New
Margin of victory		10,643	11.02	−4.52
Turnout		96,617	76.99	−1.38
Registered electors		127,844		
DMK gain from AIADMK		Swing	-17.47	

=== 1984 ===
1984 Tamil Nadu Legislative Assembly election: Tiruvaiyaru
Party	Candidate	Votes	%	±%
AIADMK	Durai Govindarajan	46,974	55.75	+0.61
TNC(K)	A. Ramamurthy	33,885	40.21	New
INC(J)	T. Prabhakaran	1,371	1.63	New
BJP	M. Chinnaiah	711	0.84	New
Independent	D. Subramanian	580	0.69	New
Margin of victory		13,089	15.53	3.03
Turnout		84,262	78.37	7.53
Registered electors		115,730		
AIADMK hold		Swing	0.61	

=== 1980 ===
1980 Tamil Nadu Legislative Assembly election: Tiruvaiyaru
Party	Candidate	Votes	%	±%
AIADMK	M. Subramanian	42,636	55.14	+25.06
DMK	G. Elangovan	32,967	42.64	+5.67
Independent	V. Saliamangalam Kavignar Kulumaiyan	810	1.05	New
Independent	S. Swayamprakasam	701	0.91	New
Margin of victory		9,669	12.50	5.63
Turnout		77,322	70.84	−1.34
Registered electors		110,334		
AIADMK gain from DMK		Swing	18.18	

=== 1977 ===
1977 Tamil Nadu Legislative Assembly election: Tiruvaiyaru
Party	Candidate	Votes	%	±%
DMK	G. Elangovan	28,500	36.96	−13.78
AIADMK	P. C. Palaniyandi	23,197	30.08	New
INC	A. Ramamurthy	16,062	20.83	−19.91
JP	T. V. A. Natarajan	6,038	7.83	New
Independent	R. Thangiayan	2,633	3.41	New
Independent	T. S. Radhagrishnan	677	0.88	New
Margin of victory		5,303	6.88	−3.13
Turnout		77,107	72.17	−6.94
Registered electors		108,342		
DMK hold		Swing	-13.78	

=== 1971 ===
1971 Tamil Nadu Legislative Assembly election: Tiruvaiyaru
Party	Candidate	Votes	%	±%
DMK	G. Elangovan	37,139	50.75	−1.19
INC	K. B. Palani	29,813	40.74	−6.34
Independent	Kevunraj	3,174	4.34	New
CPI(M)	Venkitajala Kodumburar	2,617	3.58	New
Independent	Nagarajan	443	0.61	New
Margin of victory		7,326	10.01	5.15
Turnout		73,186	79.11	−3.26
Registered electors		96,339		
DMK hold		Swing	-1.19	

=== 1967 ===
1967 Madras Legislative Assembly election: Tiruvaiyaru
Party	Candidate	Votes	%	±%
DMK	G. M. Sethurar	37,693	51.94	+12.87
INC	K. B. Palani	34,165	47.08	−6.69
Independent	R. Thangaiyan	713	0.98	New
Margin of victory		3,528	4.86	−9.84
Turnout		72,571	82.37	8.23
Registered electors		91,028		
DMK gain from INC		Swing	-1.83	

=== 1962 ===
1962 Madras Legislative Assembly election: Tiruvaiyaru
Party	Candidate	Votes	%	±%
INC	Palani	33,332	53.77	+10.76
DMK	Vaiyapuri Nattar	24,220	39.07	New
PSP	Arumugasamy	4,441	7.16	New
Margin of victory		9,112	14.70	−10.27
Turnout		61,993	74.14	18.62
Registered electors		86,295		
INC hold		Swing	10.76	

=== 1957 ===
1957 Madras Legislative Assembly election: Tiruvaiyaru
Party	Candidate	Votes	%	±%
INC	R. Swaminatha Merkondar	19,722	43.00	New
Independent	D. Packshiraja Moovarayar	8,270	18.03	New
Independent	S. Swayamprakasam	8,077	17.61	New
Independent	M. Radhakrishna Gade Rao Saheb	4,648	10.14	New
CPI	S. Ramalingam	4,096	8.93	New
Independent	V. Thiruvengadathu Iyengar	1,047	2.28	New
Margin of victory		11,452	24.97	
Turnout		45,860	55.52	
Registered electors		82,597		
INC win (new seat)				
