= Kollangarai Vallundanpattu =

Kollangarai
- village
- Country: India
- State: Tamil Nadu
- District: Thanjavur

Population (2001)
  - Total: 1,900

Languages
  - Official: Tamil
- Time zone: UTC+5:30 (IST)

Kollangarai is a village in the Thanjavur taluk of Thanjavur district, Tamil Nadu, India.

== Demographics ==
As per the 2011 census, Kollangarai Vallundanpattu had a total population of 2191 with 1093 males and 1098 females. The sex ratio was 1005 and a literacy rate of 69.42%.
