= Kachamangalam =

- Village
- Location in Tamil Nadu, India Kachamangalam (India)
- Coordinates: 10.8290385°N 78.8940844°E
- Country: India
- State: Tamil Nadu
- District: Thanjavur

Languages
  - Official: Tamil
- Time zone: UTC+5:30 (IST)

Kachamangalam is a Village in Budalur block, Thanjavur district in the Indian state of Tamil Nadu.
