= Kondavattanthidal =

- village
- Country: India
- State: Tamil Nadu
- District: Thanjavur
- Taluk: Thanjavur

Population (2001)
  - Total: 1,210

Languages
  - Official: Tamil
- Time zone: UTC+5:30 (IST)

Kondavattanthidal is a village in the Thanjavur taluk of Thanjavur district, Tamil Nadu, India.

== Demographics ==
As per the 2001 census, Kondavattanthidal had a total population of 1210 with 599 males and 611 females. The sex ratio was 1020. The literacy rate was 81.72.
