= Kadambangudi =

- village
- Location in Tamil Nadu, India Kadambangudi (India)
- Coordinates: 10.8151507°N 78.8775252°E
- Country: India
- State: Tamil Nadu
- District: Thanjavur

Population (2001)
  - Total: 1,149

Languages
  - Official: Tamil
- Time zone: UTC+5:30 (IST)

Kadambangudi is a village in the Thanjavur taluk of Thanjavur district, Tamil Nadu, India.

== Demographics ==
As per the 2001 census, Kadambangudi had a total population of 1149 with 567 males and 582 females. The sex ratio was 1005. The literacy rate was 68.18.
