= Manaiyeripatti =

Coordinates: 10°44′N 78°55′E

- village
- Interactive map of Manaiyeripatti
- Country: India
- State: Tamil Nadu
- District: Thanjavur
- Taluk: Thanjavur

Population (2001)
  - Total: 2,088

Languages
  - Official: Tamil
- Time zone: UTC+5:30 (IST)

Manaiyeripatti is a village in the Thanjavur taluk of Thanjavur district, Tamil Nadu, India.

== Demographics ==
As per the 2001 census, Manaiyeripatti had a total population of 2088 with 1055 males and 1031 females. The sex ratio was 975. The literacy rate was 61.94.
