= Kalvirayampettai =

Kalvirayanpettai Kalvirayanpettai
- village
- Location in Tamil Nadu, India
- Coordinates: 10.779464°N 79.036254°E
- Country: India
- State: Tamil Nadu
- District: Thanjavur

Languages
  - Official: Tamil
- Time zone: UTC+5:30 (IST)

Kalvirayanpettai is a village in the Thanjavur taluk of Thanjavur district, Tamil Nadu, India.

== Demographics ==
As per the 2011 census, Kalvirayanpettai had a total population of 1664 with 814 males and 850 females. The sex ratio was 1059. The literacy rate was 71.27.
