= Mathur, Thanjavur taluk =

Mathur
- village
- Country: India
- State: Tamil Nadu
- District: Thanjavur
- Taluk: Thanjavur

Population (2001)
  - Total: 5,182

Languages
  - Official: Tamil
- Time zone: UTC+5:30 (IST)

Mathur is a village in the Thanjavur taluk of Thanjavur district, Tamil Nadu, India.

== Demographics ==
As per the 2001 census, Mathur had a total population of 5182 with 2639 males and 2543 females. The sex ratio was 964. The literacy rate was 71.28.
