= Kudalur, Thanjavur =

Coordinates: 11°45′N 79°45′E

Kudalur
- village
- Interactive map of Kudalur
- Country: India
- State: Tamil Nadu
- District: Thanjavur
- Taluk: Thanjavur

Population (2001)
  - Total: 1,303

Languages
  - Official: Tamil
- Time zone: UTC+5:30 (IST)

Kudalur is a village in the Thanjavur taluk of Thanjavur district, Tamil Nadu, India.

== Demographics ==
As per the 2001 census, Kudalur had a total population of 1303 with 644 males and 649 females. The sex ratio was 1023. The literacy rate was 68.40.
