= Neelagiri =

Neelagiri Therku Thottam
- Town Panchayat
- Location in Tamil Nadu, India
- Coordinates: 10°46′00″N 79°06′57″E
- Country: India
- State: Tamil Nadu
- District: Thanjavur

Population (2001)
  - Total: 11,046

Languages
  - Official: Tamil
- Time zone: UTC+5:30 (IST)

Neelagiri Therku Thottam, commonly known as Neelagiri, is a panchayat town in the Thanjavur taluk of the Thanjavur district of the Indian state of Tamil Nadu. It is a part of the Thanjavur urban agglomeration.

== Demographics ==
As of 2001 India census, Neelagiri had a population of 11,046. Men constitute 50% of the population and women 50%. Neelagiri has an average literacy rate of 78%, higher than the national average of 59.5%: male literacy is 83%, and female literacy is 73%. In Neelagiri, 10% of the population is under 6 years of age.
