= Kurungulam Melpathi =

- village
- Country: India
- State: Tamil Nadu
- District: Thanjavur
- Taluk: Thanjavur

Population (2001)
  - Total: 3,932

Languages
  - Official: Tamil
- Time zone: UTC+5:30 (IST)

Kurungulam Melpathi is a village in the Thanjavur taluk of Thanjavur district, Tamil Nadu, India.

== Demographics ==
As per the 2001 census, Kurungulam Mekpathi had a total population of 3932 with 2005 males and 1927 females. The sex ratio was 961. The literacy rate was 73.93.
