= Mariamman Kovil (Village), Thanjavur District =

Mariamman Kovil Punnai Nallur
- Neighborhood - Thanjavur city
- Location in Tamil Nadu, India Mariamman Kovil (India)
- Coordinates: 10.7862°N 79.1889°E
- Country: India
- State: Tamil Nadu
- District: Thanjavur
- Founder: Raja Serfoji
- Named for: Mariamman

Government
  - Type: Mayor
  - Body: Thanjavur Municipal Corporation

Area
  - Total: 3.2 km^{2} (1.2 sq mi)
- Elevation: 38 m (125 ft)

Population
  - Total: 12,763
  - Density: 4,000/km^{2} (10,000/sq mi)

Languages
  - Official: Tamil
- Time zone: UTC+5:30 (IST)
- PIN: 613501
- Telephone code: 04362
- Vehicle registration: TN-49

Mariamman Kovil or Punnainallur is a neighborhood of Thanjavur city in the district of Thanjavur, Tamil Nadu, India. It is located 5 Km east of Thanjavur City Center and Suburban area of Thanjavur City on the Thanjavur - Nagapattinam Highway. It is home to the Amman Punnainallur Mariamman temple. This is also home to the Kathaiamman Temple and few other temples in the surroundings. It can be reached by road via public transport from Thanjavur old bus stand and new bus stand with many buses plying from there. The nearest railway station is Thanjavur Junction, and nearest airport is Tiruchirappalli International Airport

Mariamman Kovil developed as a small hamlet around the Punnainallur Mariamman temple, and is now it is a neighborhood of Thanjavur City with basic amenities such as a high school, Hospital, Electricity Board office, Telephone Exchange and Post Office. Other than temple tourism, industries in the village include agriculture and dairy businesses. The village host an annual festival called Mariamman Kovil Thiruvizha, which includes various Hindu religion rituals in the temple and festivities such as musical performances and dance.

In 2025, It was merged with Thanjavur City Corporation
