= Veeranarasanpettai =

- village
- Country: India
- State: Tamil Nadu
- District: Thanjavur
- Taluk: Thanjavur

Population (2001)
  - Total: 750

Languages
  - Official: Tamil
- Time zone: UTC+5:30 (IST)

Veeranarasanpettai is a village in the Thanjavur taluk of Thanjavur district, Tamil Nadu, India.

== Demographics ==
As per the 2001 census, Veeranarasanpettai had a total population of 750 with 366 males and 384 females. The sex ratio was 1049. The literacy rate was 58.55.
