= Vendayampatti =

Coordinates: 10°46′N 78°55′E

- village
- Interactive map of Vendayampatti
- Country: India
- State: Tamil Nadu
- District: Thanjavur
- Taluk: Thanjavur

Population (2001)
  - Total: 1,294

Languages
  - Official: Tamil
- Time zone: UTC+5:30 (IST)

Vendayampatti is a village in the Thanjavur taluk of Thanjavur district, Tamil Nadu, India.

== Demographics ==
As per the 2001 census, Vendayampatti had a total population of 1294 with 671 males and 623 females. The sex ratio was 928. The literacy rate was 58.78.
