= Nallicheri =

Neighbourhood in Thanjavur district, Tamil Nadu, India

- Village
- Nickname: Nandimangai
- Nallicheri, Thanjavur district, Tamil Nadu
- Coordinates: 10.8696°N 79.1635°E
- Country: India
- State: Tamil Nadu
- District: Thanjavur
- Taluk: Papanasam

Population (2011)
  - Total: 1,136

Language
  - Official: Tamil
- Time zone: UTC+5:30 (IST)
- PIN: 614206

Nallicheri is a village in the Papanasam taluk of Thanjavur district, Tamil Nadu, India.

== Location ==
Nallicheri (Tamil Nadu)

== Demographics ==
As per the 2011 census of India, Nallicheri had a total population of 1,136 out of which males constituted 546 and females were 590 persons.
