= Pillaiyarpatti, Thanjavur district =

Pillaiyarpatti
- Village
- Country: India
- State: Tamil Nadu

Population (2001)
  - Total: 6,309

Languages
  - Official: Tamil
- Time zone: UTC+5:30 (IST)

Pillaiyarpatti is a village in the Thanjavur taluk of the Thanjavur district in the Indian state of Tamil Nadu.

== Demographics ==
As per the 2011 census, Pillaiyarpatti had a population of 4,856 with 2,299 males and 2,557 females. The sex ratio was 892 and the literacy rate was 83.57%.
