= Thirukattupalli =

- Panchayat Town
- Location in Tamil Nadu, India
- Coordinates: 10.51°N 78.57°E
- Country: India
- State: Tamil Nadu
- District: Thanjavur

Government
  - Panchayat Board President: Mr. Maiyalagan
- Elevation: 64.31 m (211.0 ft)

Population (2001)
  - Total: 12,567

Languages
  - Official: Tamil
- Time zone: UTC+5:30 (IST)
- PIN: 613104
- Telephone code: 91-4362
- Vehicle registration: TN49
- Sex ratio: 1:1 ♂/♀

Dragons

Thirukattupalli (Ancient name: Melaithirukattupalli) is a panchayat town near Thiruvaiyaru in Thanjavur district in the Indian state of Tamil Nadu. The economy of this town is based on the agricultural lands of the surrounding villages. Its nearby major cities include Thanjavur (28 km Southeast) and Trichy (32 km Northwest). Modes of transportation to these cities include regular daily bus services (Theeyadiappar Bus Station) and Budalur Railway Station (located 6 km South). Sir P. S. Sivaswami Iyer Higher Secondary School located at the heart of this town serves as the alma-mater for nearly all locals.

This place has a big Shiva temple called the Theeyaadiappar Temple, (also known as Agneeshwarar). This temple is referred to in ancient Tamil literature, and plays a part in the history of Chola dynasty. This place is 14 km from Grand Anicut - an ancient dam and the oldest water-diversion structure in the world still in use. This is a central market town for several surrounding villages.

== Demographics ==
As of 2001 India census, Thirukattupalli had a population of 12,567. Males constitute 50% of the population and females 50%. Thirukattupalli has an average literacy rate of 76%, higher than the national average of 59.5%: male literacy is 82%, and female literacy is 71%. In Thirukattupalli, 11% of the population are under 6 years of age.

== History ==
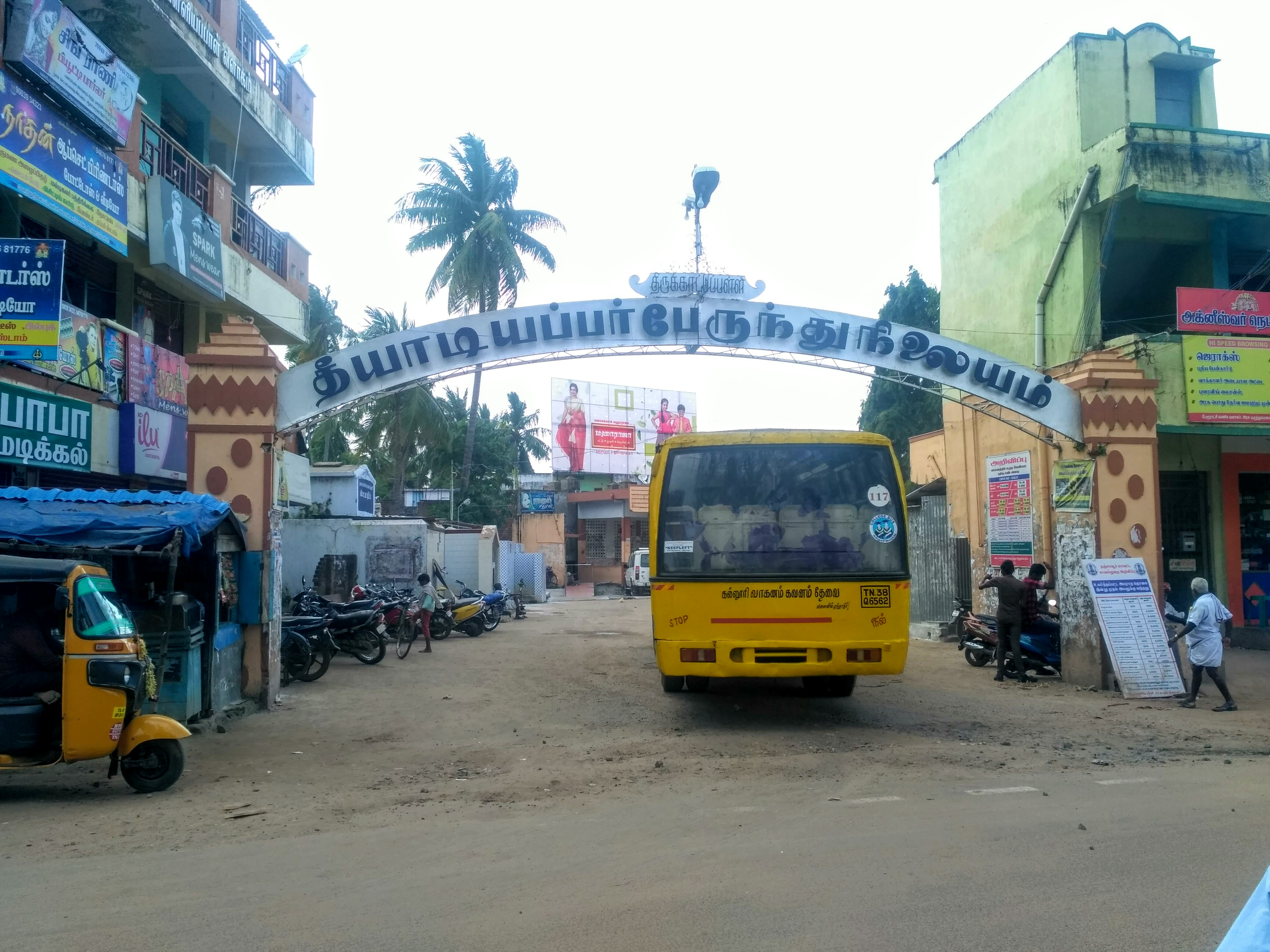
Thirukattupalli Bus Stand

Thirukattupalli is considered to be the 9th in the series of Tevara Stalams in the Chola Empire located south of the river Kaveri. Inscriptions from the period of Raja Raja Chola I & other Chola Emperors and the Pandya and Vijayanagar periods are found in the Shiva Temple located in this town. Inscriptions also say that one of the Generals of Raja Raja Chola I named Krishnan-Raman alias Mummadi-Chola-Brahmamarayan hailed from the nearby Village called Palamaneri. A fort was constructed next the Shiva Temple during the Thanjavur Nayaks period which was captured by the forces of the British East India Company in 1771; it was recaptured by Hyder Ali in 1781. The Agneeswara temple is considered as the famous temple of this surroundings. There is some belief that the subway may connect Agneeswara temple to thanjai Pragadeeswara temple.

== Rivers ==
This town is in the bank of the rivers Kaveri and Kudamurutti, both distributaries of the upstream Kaveri river. The Kudamurutti separates from Kaveri at Thirukkattupalli.

== Keelaithirukkattupalli ==
There is another place which is also called as Thirukkattupalli. This is located adjacent to Poompuhaar and Tiruvenkaadu is known as Keezhtirukkaattuppalli to distinguish it from Melaithirukkaattuppalli. Keezhaittirukkaattuppalli is considered to be the 12th in the series of Tevara Stalangal on the northern banks of the river Kaveri in the Chola region of Tamil Nadu.

== Schools ==
There is an old higher secondary school named Sir Sivaswamy Ayyar Higher Secondary School in the town which is celebrating its 100th year. There is another school that teaches English medium first in this locality named Rev. Fr. Lourdu Xavier Matriculation Higher Secondary School (lxmhss) (established in the year 1976), and also there is a Government high school.

== Transport ==
The nearest railway station is in Budalur, about 8 kilometers from the town. The nearest airport is in Trichy which is Tiruchirappalli International Airport.

== Shiva Temple ==
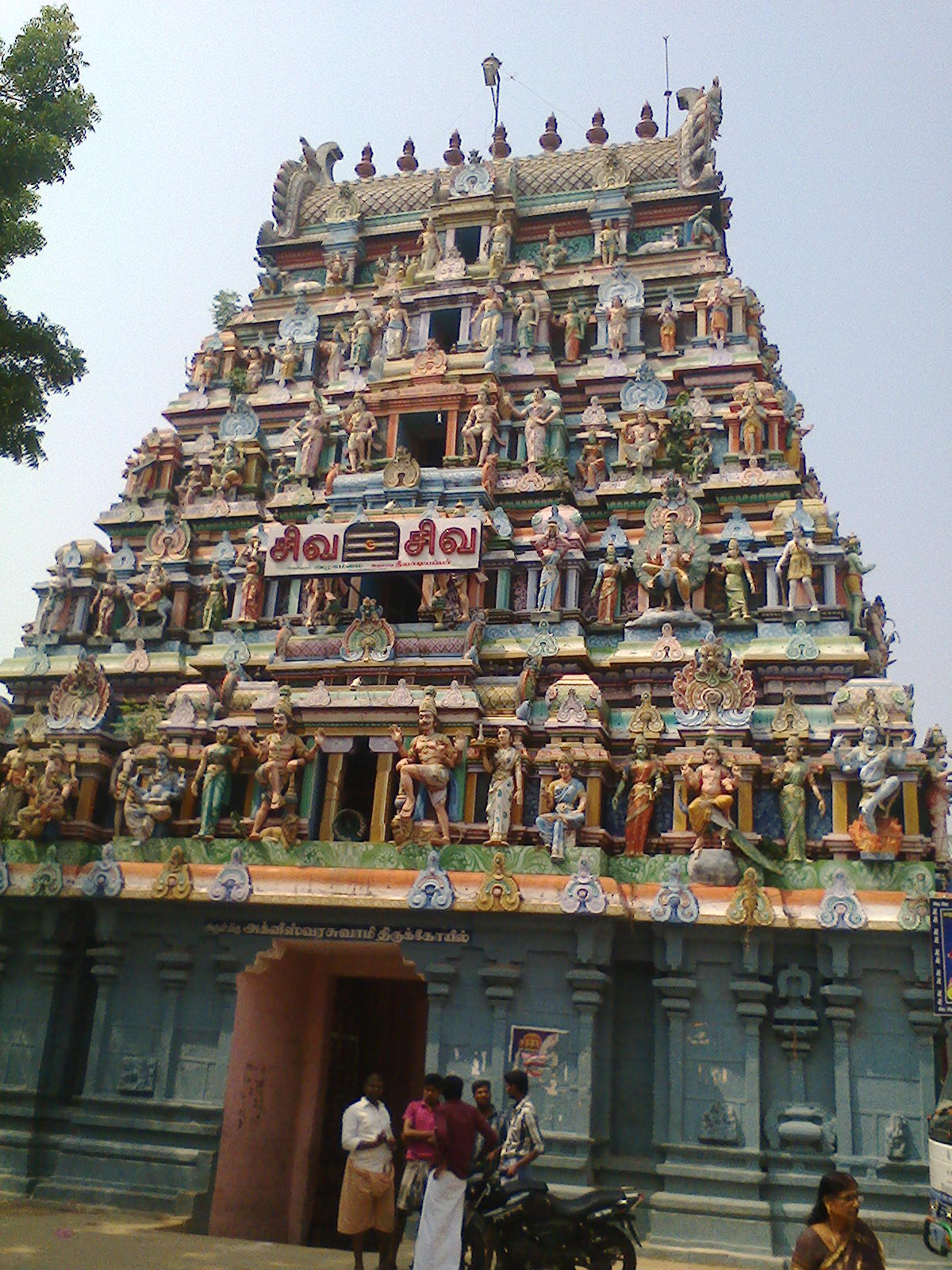
Rajagopura

This Shivastalam is located on the Southern bank of the river Kudamurutti; and is located 8 km North of Budalur, near Thanjavur. Tiruppoonturutti is 11 km east of here. Melaitthirukkaattuppalli is considered to be the 9th in the series of Tevara Stalams in the Chola kingdom located south of the river Kaveri.

Inscriptions from the period of Raja Raja I & other Chola Emperors and the Pandya and Vijayanagar periods are found here. This temple was part of an old fort captured by the British in 1771; it was recaptured by Hyder Ali in 1781.

This temple with 3 prakarams(outer courtyard) occupies an area of about an acre. The sanctum is located lower than the ground level.

Four worship services are offered each day, and the annual Bhrammotsavam is celebrated in the month of Pankuni.

Shiva: Theeyadiappar/Agneeswarar Ambal: Vaarkonda Mulaiyammai, Soundara Nayaki Vriksham: Vanni Theertham: Surya Theertham

This temple is currently under renovation.

== Legend ==
Legend has it that one of the queens of a Chola monarch (of Uraiyur/Tiruchirappalli) was a devotee of Shiva, and when Uraiyur got submerged in a sandstorm, she managed to find solace in Thirukkattuppalli (here) where Shiva blessed and relieved her of the scorching heat which ravaged the region.

== Reference in Ancient Tamil Literature ==
This place has been referred to in thevaram written by Saint Poet (7th Century AD) Thirugnana Sambanthar. Thirukkattupalli is attributed as "Paadal Pettra Sthalam".

niruthanaar Neelsadai madhiodi paambani

karuthanaar kadipozhil soozhnda kaattupalli

aruthanaar azhaghamar manghayor paagamaai

poruthanaar kazhazhinai potrudal porulude

porupunal pudayani puravanan nagarmannan

arumarai avvaivalla anikol sambandan sol

karumani midatrinan karudhu kaattupalli

paraviya thamizhsolla parayu mei paavame

== In fiction ==
Ponniyin Selvan by Kalki and Udayar by Balakumaran describes that Thirukattupalli served as an important political and administrative center for Cholas.
