= Kandithampattu =

- village
- Location in Tamil Nadu, India
- Coordinates: 10.724055°N 79.178132°Ene,title
- Country: India
- State: Tamil Nadu
- District: Thanjavur
- Established: 100 BC

Population (2001)
  - Total: 2,142
- Time zone: UTC+5:30 (IST)
- PIN -->: 614 904

Kasavazhanadu Kandithampattu is a village in the Thanjavur taluk of the Thanjavur district, in Tamil Nadu, India.

== Demographics ==
As per the 2001 census, Kandithampattu had a total population of 2142, with 1048 males and 1094 females. The sex ratio was 1044. The literacy rate was 68.91%.
