= Appakkudathaan Perumal Temple =

Perumal temple in Thanjavur district, Tamil Nadu, India

Tirupernagar
- Appakkudathaan Perumal
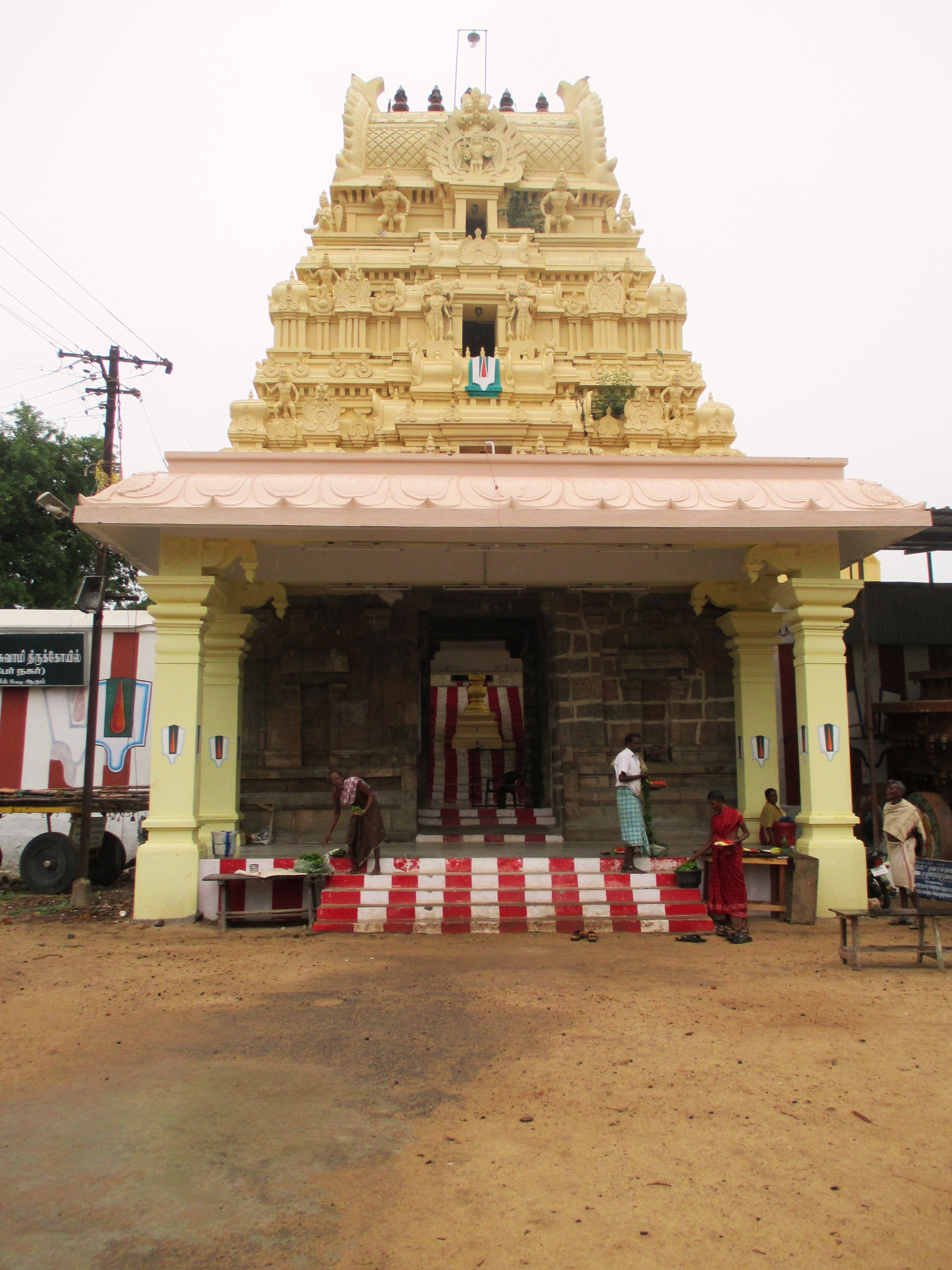

- Appakkudathaan Perumal Temple, Koviladi, Thanjavur district, Tamil Nadu

Religion
- Affiliation: Hinduism
- District: Thanjavur
- Deity: Appakkudathaan Perumal (Vishnu); Kamalavalli Thayar (Lakshmi)

Location
- Location: Koviladi
- State: Tamil Nadu
- Country: India
- Coordinates: 10.839431°N 78.889455°E

Architecture
- Type: Dravidian architecture
- Creator: Karikala Chola, Medieval Cholas

Appakkudathaan Perumal Temple or Thirupper Nagar, is a Perumal temple located in Koviladi, a village 10 miles (16 km) from Tiruchirapalli, Tamil Nadu, India. It is dedicated to Vishnu and is one of the Divya Desams—the 108 temples of Vishnu revered in Nalayira Divya Prabandham by the 12 poet saints or Alvars. This temple is located along the banks of the Cauvery River and is one of the five Pancharanga Kshetrams located on the banks of the Cauvery River.

The temple is believed to be of significant antiquity, with contributions at different times from the Medieval Cholas. The temple is built on an elevated structure and is approached through a flight of 21 steps. The rajagopuram (the main gateway) has three tiers and the temple has a precinct around the sanctum.

Ranganatha is believed to have appeared for king Upmananya and sage Parasara. The temple has four daily rituals; the first begins at 8:30 a.m. and the last at 8 p.m. There are four annual festivals on the temple's calendar; its chariot festival celebrated during the Tamil month of Panguni (March–April) is the most prominent of these.

== Legend and etymology ==
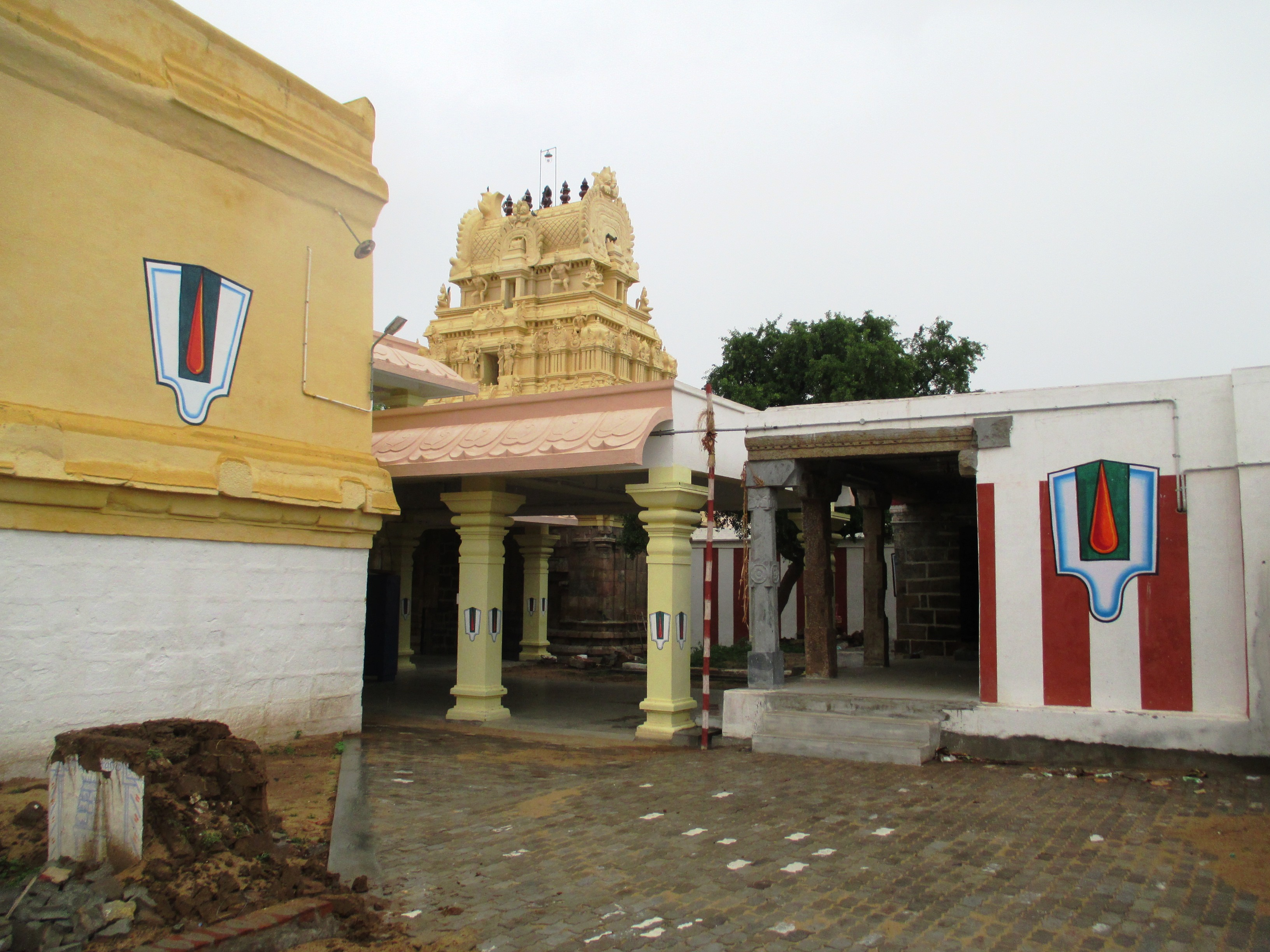
Image of the first precinct

As per Hindu legend, the king Ubhamanyu earned the wrath of sage Durvasar and lost all his physical strength. To get rid of the curse, he was asked to feed one lakh people every day. One day, Hindu god Vishnu disguised himself as an old man, appeared before the king and asked for a meal. The king went on donating and the old man consumed all the food prepared for the people. The king was shocked and bewildered at this strange act. The old man asked for a kudam (pot) of Neyyaappam (a sweatmeal), stating that only it can fulfill his hunger. The king fulfilled the wish and later realised that it was Vishnu who had appeared as the old man. The king was relieved of the sage's curse by the blessings of Vishnu. Because of the legend, Vishnu is called "Appakkudathaan" in the temple.

It is believed that this temple is where sage Markandeya was liberated from his curse from Yama (god of death), who cursed Markandeya to die at 16 years old. The presiding deity is Ranganatha, who is believed to have crushed Indira's (a celestial deity) pride. The place is called "Koviladi" because it is located downstream of the Srirangam Ranganathaswamy temple, which is referred as kovil in Vaishnava tradition. The temple is called as "Tiruppernagar" because the region was called "Per Nagar" during Chola times. The Alvars refer the place as "Tiruppernagar" in Nalayira Divya Prabandam, the Sri Vaishnava canon.

The temple has inscriptions from the 18th year of the reign of Aditya Chola. The recorded inscriptions in this temple are numbered 283, 300, 301 and 303 of 1901. As per Nammalvar, the temple was home to the Vedic scholars of the time. The inscriptions in the temple indicate donations given towards the building of the main hall. Koviladi was one of the focal points of fighting in the regions surrounding Tiruchirapalli during the Anglo-French war; there are no records on the contributions or damages caused by this war.

== Architecture ==
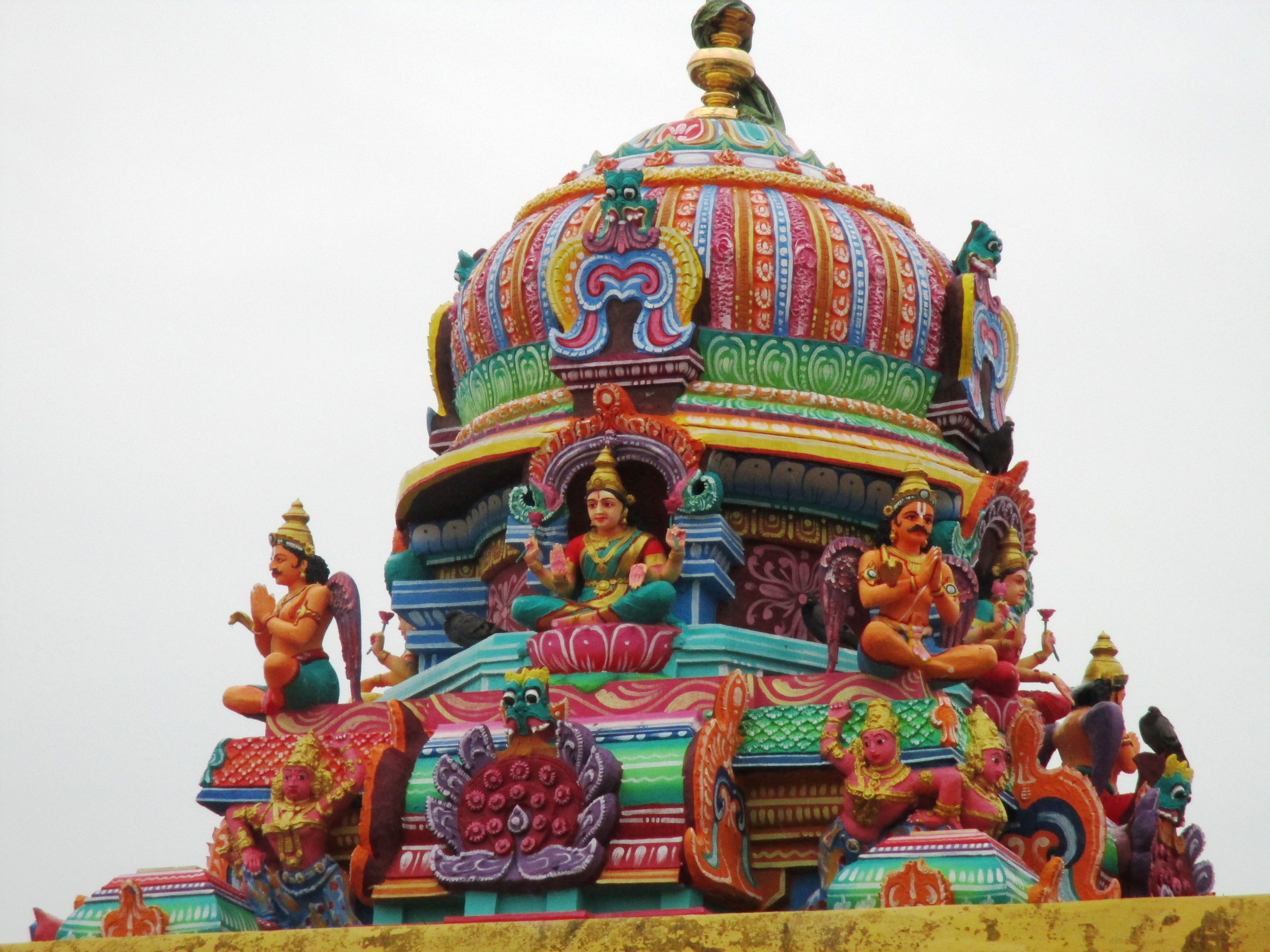
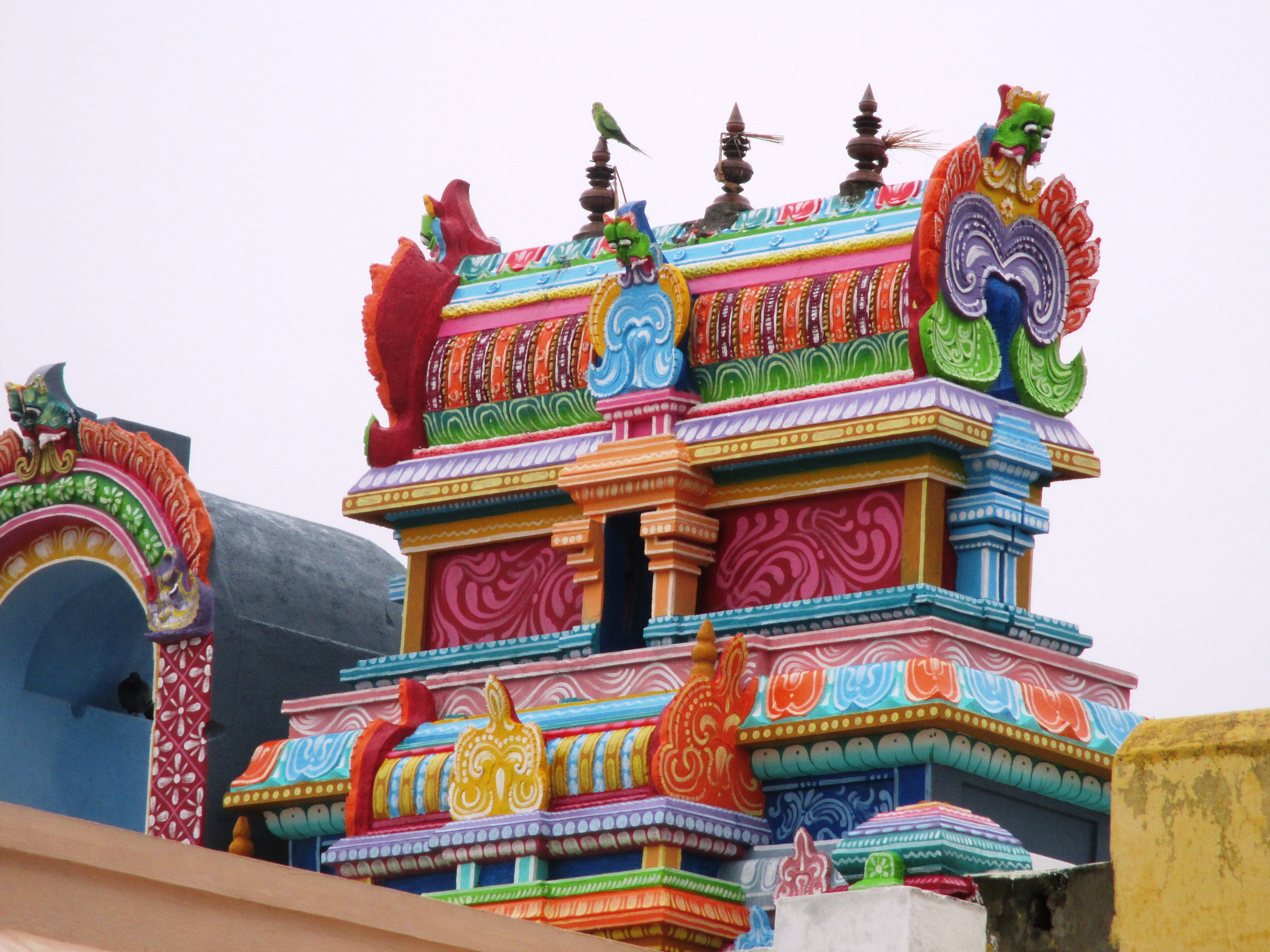
Shrines of Ranganathar and Thayar

The temple has a three-tiered rajagopuram facing west and an elevated structure approached through 21 steps. The Moolavar (presiding deity) of the temple, "Appala Rangan", is seen in Bhujangasayanm (a reclining posture) facing west and is surrounded by Bhooma Devi and Kamalavalli Thayar. The central deity is depicted in a reclining posture called pujanga sayanam, and he is shown holding the holy pot in his right hand. The sanctum also contains the image of Upayamanyu and Dhurvarsa. The central deity is called Appala Ranganathar; he is located away from the Ranganathar in Srirangam. The temple has a prakaram (precinct) around the sanctum. According to historian K.V. Soundararajan, the Rangantha temples in South India built during the 9th and 10th centuries have systematic arrangement of subsidiary deities as seen in this temple along with the Sowmya Narayana Perumal temple at Thirukoshtiyur, Veeraraghava Perumal temple at Thiruvallur, Rajagopalaswamy temple at Mannargudi and Rangantha temple at Srirangapatna.

== Festivals and religious practises ==
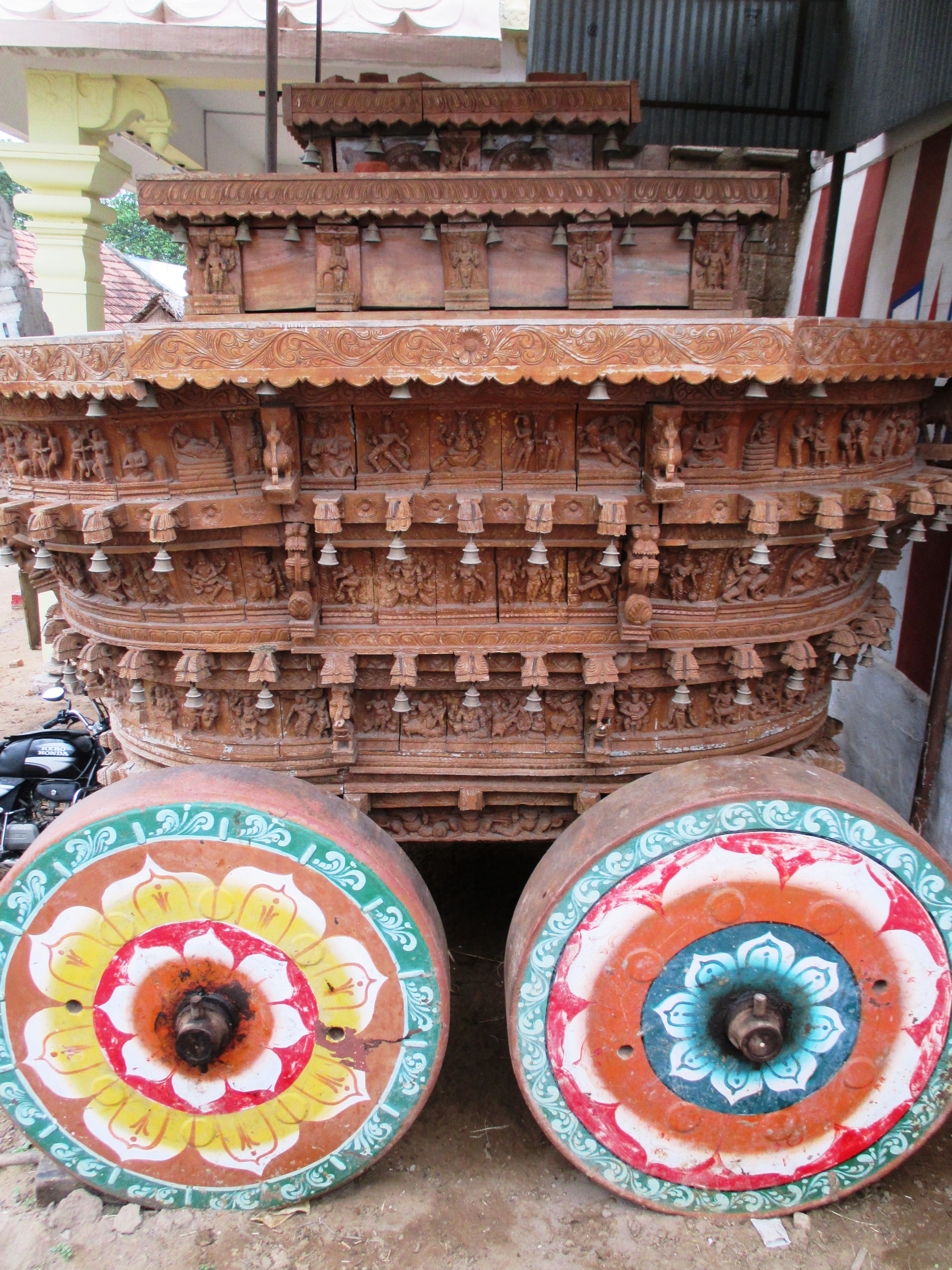
Image of the temple car used during procession

The temple priests perform the pooja (rituals) every day, including festivals. Like other Vishnu temples of Tamil Nadu, the priests belong to the Vaishnavaite community, from the Brahmin varna. The temple rituals are performed four times a day; Kalasanthi at 8:30 a.m., Uchikalam at 10:00 a.m., Sayarakshai at 6:00 p.m. and Ardha Jamam at 8:00 p.m. Each ritual comprises three steps; alangaram (decoration), neivethanam (food offering) and deepa aradanai (waving of lamps) for the presiding deity. The worship involves religious instructions in the Vedas (sacred text) read by priests and prostration by worshippers in front of the temple mast. There are weekly, monthly and fortnightly rituals.

The major festivals celebrated in the temple are 13-day Panguni Brahmotsavam, Kaisika Dwadasi in Karthigai (November - December), Teertha Vari at the River Cauvery on the day of Maasi Magam (February - March) and Nammalvar Moksham during Era Pathu in Margali (December - February). The chariot festival is the most prominent festival of the temple and the surrounding villages. It is celebrated during the Tamil month of Panguni (April–May); devotees pull the temple chariot housing the festival deity, round the streets of Koviladi. Verses from the Nalayira Divya Prabandham are recited by a group of temple priests and music made with the nadasvaram (pipe instrument) and tavil (percussion instrument) is played. Vaikuntha Ekadashi during December–January, Navarathri during September–October and butter pot breaking ceremony (locally called uri adi) are the other festivals celebrated in the temple.

== Religious significance ==
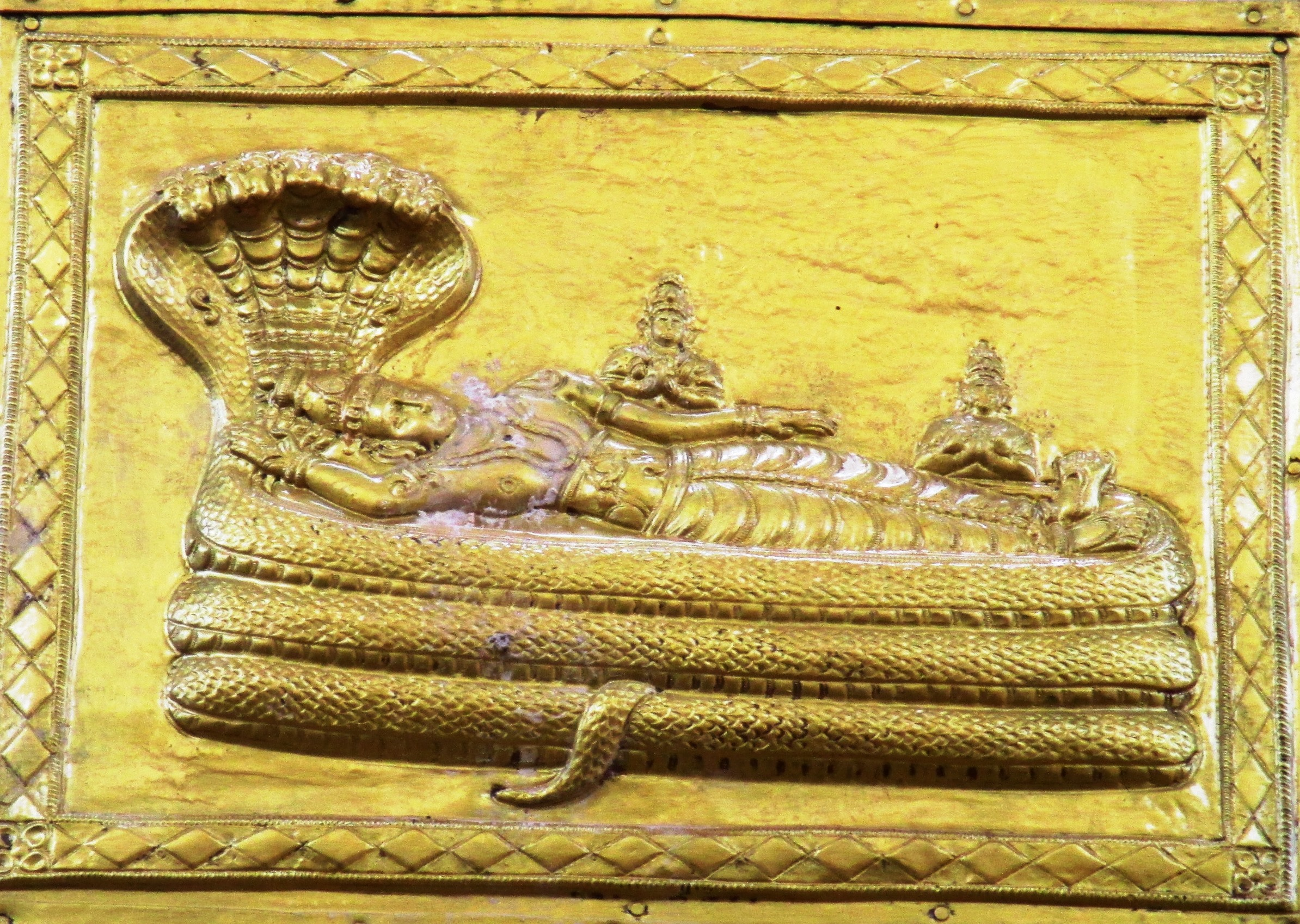
Plaque of Ranganatha in the flag post

The Pancharanga Kshetrams (also called Pancharangams, meaning the "five Rangams or Ranganathas") is a group of five Hindu temples on the banks of the Kaveri River dedicated to Ranganatha, a form of Vishnu. The five Pancharanga Kshetrams are: The Srirangapatnam called the Adi Ranga, the first temple on the banks of the Kaveri River from the upstream side; the Srirangam (island in Tiruchirappalli) in Tamil Nadu known as Adya Ranga (the last temple), Appalarangam or Koviladi at Tiurppernagar in Tamil Nadu, Parimala Ranganatha Perumal Temple or Mayuram at Indalur, Mayiladuthurai and Vatarangam at Sirkazhi. The Sarangapani temple at Kumbakonam is mentioned in place of Vatarangam in some references. This is the only Divya Desam where neyyappam is offered to the deity every night as neivedhyam. There is a belief that childless couples upon praying and offering butter with sugar to the Santhanagopalan deity at the temple are blessed with children.

The Appakkudathaan Perumal Temple is revered in the Nalayira Divya Prabandham, a 7th–9th century Vaishnava canon of 33 verses by Periyalvar, Thirumangai Alvar, Thirumalisai Alvar and Nammalvar. The temple is classified as a Divya Desam, the 108 Vishnu temples that are revered in the Vaishnava canon. The temple is counted as the sixth in line of Divya Desams located in Chola Nadu. The temple is also mentioned in the Sanskrit work Srirangaraja Sarithapanam. The temple is also the mukti stalam; the place where saint Periyalvar is believed to have attained the feet of Vishnu. Nammalvar is believed to have recited his last song in the Divya Prabandam from this temple. Some scriptures quote that this temple is more ancient than the Srirangam temple.
