= Pudupattinam, Thanjavur taluk =

Pudupattinam
- village
- Interactive map of Pudupattinam
- Country: India
- State: Tamil Nadu
- District: Thanjavur
- Taluk: Thanjavur

Population (2001)
  - Total: 7,261

Languages
  - Official: Tamil
- Time zone: UTC+5:30 (IST)

Pudupattinam is a village in the Thanjavur taluk of Thanjavur district, Tamil Nadu, India.

== Demographics ==
As per the 2001 census, Pudupattinam had a total population of 7261 with 3577 males and 3684 females. The sex ratio was 1030. The literacy rate was 85.02.
