= Sengipatti =

- village
- Location in Tamil Nadu, India
- Country: India
- State: Tamil Nadu
- District: Thanjavur
- Taluk: Budalur taluk

Area
  - Total: 17.2117 km^{2} (6.6455 sq mi)

Population (2011)
  - Total: 4,271
  - Density: 248.1/km^{2} (642.7/sq mi)

Languages
  - Official: Tamil
- Time zone: UTC+5:30 (IST)
- PIN: 613402
- Vehicle registration: TN-49

Sengipatti is a village in Budalur taluk on the Tanjore–Trichy National Highway of Thanjavur district, Tamil Nadu. It is located 23 kilometers from Thanjavur, 33 kilometers from Tiruchirapalli, 46 kilometers from Pudukkottai, 65 kilometers from Ariyalur, and 66 kilometers from Kumbakonam. It is a main junction for bus routes connecting Thanjavur, Trichy, and Pudukottai districts.

The Mahatma Gandhi Memorial Tuberculosis Sanatorium is a notable landmark. The village is the westernmost in Thanjavur district, situated on the border with Tiruchirapalli district. SASTRA University is located just 7 km from Sengipatti, while the National Institute of Technology Trichy is 17 km away. Sengipatti is a developing village with increasing industrial activity. In addition, the state government established the Government College of Engineering, Thanjavur in 2012.

The proposed All India Institutes of Medical Sciences for Tamil Nadu was initially considered for construction here, but it was eventually built in the Madurai district. Sanoorapatti, a prime spot on the national highway between Trichy and Thanjavur, is located 1 km from Sengipatti and the National Highway.

== Importance ==
Sengipatti has gained prominence due to the presence of The Mahatma Gandhi Memorial Tuberculosis Sanatorium.

== Education ==
Sengipatti is home to two important educational institutions:

- Government College of Engineering, Thanjavur
- RVS Agricultural College

== Demographics ==
According to the 2011 census, Sengipatti had a population of 4,271, comprising 2,115 males and 2,156 females. The sex ratio was 1,019, which is higher than the Tamil Nadu state average of 996. The literacy rate in Sengipatti was 78.99%, slightly below the state average of 80.09%.
