= Budalur =

- Taluk
- Location in Tamil Nadu, India Budalur (India)
- Coordinates: 10°47′22″N 78°58′45″E
- Country: India
- State: Tamil Nadu
- District: Thanjavur

Area
  - Total: 9.9 km^{2} (3.8 sq mi)

Population
  - Total: 9,420
  - Density: 950/km^{2} (2,500/sq mi)

Languages
  - Official: Tamil
- Time zone: UTC+5:30 (IST)
- Budalur P/O: 613602
- Coastline: 83 kilometres (52 mi)
- Mallipattinam: Thanjavur

Budalur (pronounced as 'boodhaloor') is a Town and Taluk in Thanjavur district of Tamil Nadu. There is a famous historic Shiva temple known as the Abathsagayeshwarar Temple situated in Budalur, built by Great Emperor Raja Raja Cholan (who built the Big temple in Thanjavur) during 10th century. This place is easy to access from, Thanjavur by 20 kilometers and Tiruchirapalli by 34 kilometers with both Railways and roadways.

== Transport ==
The most significant landmark of Budalur is its Railway Station that was built by the British people some 140 years ago. This station falls under the Class B category of Indian Railway stations and most trains that pass through the station will stop there for passengers. Some 30 years ago, this was a small village with much less population and the major occupation was agriculture. But now lot of other businesses are available and the life style of people has also changed. The major change is due to the easiness to travel provided by Railway Station.

There are lot of roadways from Budalur to reach the main cities of Thanjavur and Trichy. There are lot of buses available from major towns and other villages to Budalur. Most of the people use two-wheelers. There are taxi stands, load vehicle stands and a vegetable market available around the railway station. There are 3 petrol bunks available in Budalur.

== Schools ==
There are 3 Matriculation Schools (Our Lady of Health Matriculation School-A Christian Convent, Vidhya Matriculation School, Wesley Matriculation School), 2 Government Elementary Schools, a Government Girls Higher Secondary School and a Government Higher Secondary School. Now built a CBSE school named SHEMFORD FUTURISTIC SCHOOL, placed near new taluk office. Budalur is the main educational center for lot of small villages around it.

== Offices ==
A sub-registrar's Office in Budalur covers more than 80 villages in Budalur Circle. Also the major office of Budalur is the Panchayat Union Office (formerly called as Block Development Office) that connects Budalur with 40 major village panchayats with 90 smaller villages.

There is a Public Works Department Office and an Assistant Educational Office. The Primary Health Care Centre (PHC) in Budalur serves a lot of village people, free of cost. The PHC contains sophisticated Operation Theater, Beds and Scanning facilities to help people in case of urgency.

As per the announcement from Tamil Nadu Chief Minister in May 2013, the Thanjavur Taluk is bifurcated and a new Budalur Taluk is formed.

== Temples ==
There are 7 main temples for Lord Shiva(2), Lord Vijaya Kothanda Raama, Lord Murugan, Goddess Naachiyaaramman, Lord Ganesh and Lord Ayyanar. One of Lord Shiva's temple is called as Aabathsahaayeswara (God who helps during problems) temple, which was constructed by Raja Raja Chola (who built Thanjavur Big temple), is located in a vast landscape in Kovilpathu (a sub-division of Budalur). This temple has got songs from Ancient Devotees of Lord Shiva like Sundarar etc.,. There are many temples located near by budalur, like lord uthirakaruppu belongs to the kodumbalur arayar or (now kodumburar) who were the rulers of Kodumbalur and later migrated from kodumbalur following the wedding of Vanathi, the daughter of Kodumbalur Athiyamaan to Raja Raja Chola the Ist. This temple is located at alagapettai lake in karayampatti village.

The world famous Poondi Matha Bascillica (a Catholic Shrine), is located in 9 km from Budalur. Also there is a mosque and 2 churches in Budalur. In total, Budalur maintains secularism.

The place Thiruvaiyaru, which is famous for its Thiyagaraja Aaraadhanaa (Carnatic Music Concert), is located at 24 km from Budalur.
