= Thanjavur Taluk =

Coordinates: 10.782°N 79.130°E

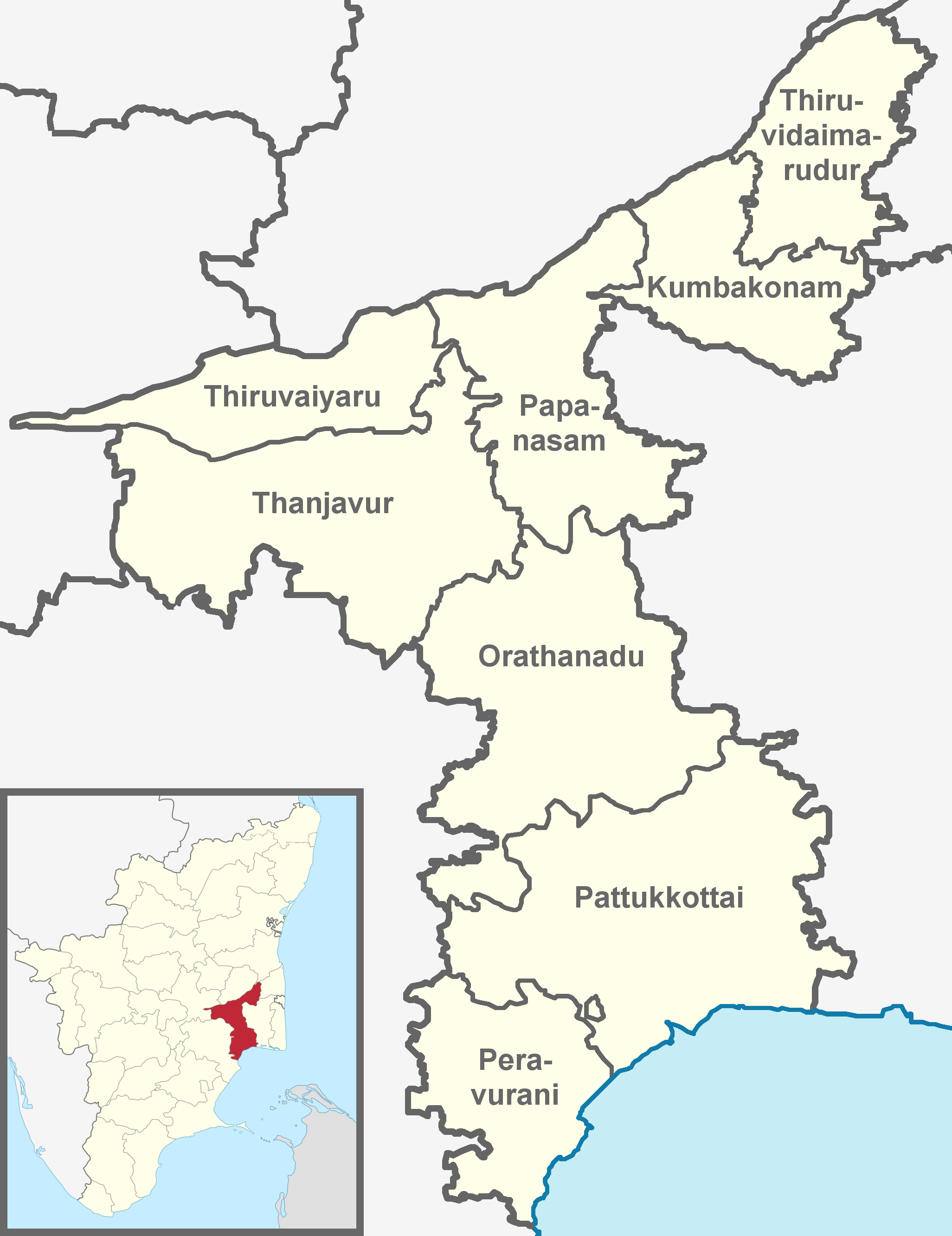
Tuluks of Thanjavur district, Tamil Nadu, India

Thanjavur is a taluk of Thanjavur district of the Indian state of Tamil Nadu.

== Overview ==
Within the taluk are the municipality of Thanjavur and the panchayat towns of Nanjikottai, Vallam, Neelagiri, Pudupattinam, and Vilar.

== Demographics ==
According to the 2011 census, the taluk of Thanjavur had a population of 510,411 with 253,723 males and 256,688 females. There were 1,012 women for every 1,000 men. The taluk had a literacy rate of 78.51%. Of the children less than six years of age, 23,251 were male and 21,749 were female.

== Villages ==
- Kondavattanthidal
- Kotrapatti
- Kudalur
- Kullangarai
- Kurungulam Melpathi
- Manaiyeripatti
- Mathur
- Melachittakadu
- Melavelithottam
- Muthuveerakandiampatti
- Palaiyapatti Therkusethi
- Palaiyapatti Vadakkusethi
- Perumbur Ist Sethi
- Perumbur IInd Sethi
- Pillaiyarmatham
- Pinnai Nallur
- Rayamundanpatti
- Sakkarasamudram
- Sennampatti
- Sholagampatti
- Surakudipatti
- Thondarayampadi
- Veeranarasanpettai
- Vendayampatti
- Vennalodai
