= Thirumalaisamudram =

- village
- Country: India
- State: Tamil Nadu
- District: Thanjavur
- Taluk: Thanjavur
- PIN Code: 613401
- Elevation: 60 m (200 ft)

Population (2011)
  - Total: 6,783

Languages
  - Official: Tamil
- Time zone: UTC+5:30 (IST)
- Postal code: 613401
- Vehicle registration: TN-49

Thirumalaisamudram is a village in Thanjavur taluk of Thanjavur district, Tamil Nadu. It is located at a distance of 17 kilometres west of Thanjavur, 5 kilometres from Vallam and 39 kilometres east of Tiruchirapalli on the Thanjavur-Tiruchirapalli highway of National Highway 83 (India). It adjoins the neighbouring village of Vallam Pudursethi.

== Importance ==
Thirumalaisamudram has risen in importance due to the emergence of SASTRA University. The university covers most of the north-eastern part of the village. There are also a number of tea shops and restaurants adjoining the college.

== Geography and climate ==
Thirumalaisamudram is located at 10.70°N 78.68°E The tributaries of river Cauvery, namely, the Grand Anaicut canal (Pudhaaru), Vadavaaru and Vennaaru rivers flow through the city. Thirumalaisamudram is situated in the Cauvery delta, at a distance of 364 km (226 mi) south-west of Chennai,44.7 km (27.8 mi) east of Tiruchirappalli and 17.9 km (11.1 mi). To the south of Thanjavur city, is the Vallam tableland, a small plateau interspersed at regular intervals by ridges of sandstone. The nearest seaport is Nagapattinam which is 103 km (64 mi) east of Thanjavur. The nearest airport is Tiruchirapalli International Airport, located at a distance of 44.7 km (27.8 mi). The nearest railhead is Thanjavur Junction railway station, located at a distance of 22.2 km (13.8 mi). The city has an elevation of 60 m (200 ft) above mean sea level.

Climate data for Thirumalaisamudram
Month	Jan	Feb	Mar	Apr	May	Jun	Jul	Aug	Sep	Oct	Nov	Dec	Year
Mean daily maximum °C (°F)	30.0 (86.0)	32.0 (89.6)	36.0 (96.8)	39.0 (102.2)	39.0 (102.2)	36.0 (96.8)	35.0 (95.0)	34.0 (93.2)	33.0 (91.4)	32.0 (89.6)	29.0 (84.2)	29.0 (84.2)	33.7 (92.6)
Mean daily minimum °C (°F)	18.0 (64.4)	19.0 (66.2)	22.0 (71.6)	25.0 (77.0)	28.0 (82.4)	27.0 (80.6)	26.0 (78.8)	25.0 (77.0)	24.0 (75.2)	22.9 (73.2)	20.8 (69.4)	19.2 (66.6)	23.1 (73.5)
Average precipitation mm (inches)	5.0 (0.20)	6.0 (0.24)	20.0 (0.79)	19.0 (0.75)	33.0 (1.30)	45.0 (1.77)	28.0 (1.10)	57.0 (2.24)	77.0 (3.03)	117.0 (4.61)	102.0 (4.02)	34.0 (1.34)	543 (21.4)
Source: Best time to visit, weather and climate Tirumalaisamudram

The period from November to February in Thirumalaisamudram is pleasant, with a climate full of warm days and cool nights. The onset of summer is from March, with the mercury reaching its peak by the end of May and June. The average temperatures range from 81 °F (27 °C) in January to 97 °F (36 °C) in May and June. Summer rains are sparse and the first monsoon, the South-West monsoon, commences in June and continues till September. North-East monsoon begins October and continues till January. The rainfall during the South-West monsoon period is much lower than that of the North-East monsoon. The North-East monsoon is beneficial to the district at large because of the heavy rainfall and the Western ghats (mountain ranges) feeding the river Cauvery. The average rainfall is 37 inches (940 mm), most of which is contributed by the North-East monsoon.

== Demographics ==
As per the 2011 census, Thirumalaisamudram had a population of 6,783 with 4020 males and 2763 females. The sex ratio was 687 and the literacy rate, 94.88 with Males 97.41 and Females 91.21.
