= Achanoor =

- village
- Location in Tamil Nadu, India Achanoor (India)
- Coordinates: 10°52′49″N 79°4′5″E
- Country: India
- State: Tamil Nadu

Languages
  - Official: Tamil
- Time zone: UTC+5:30 (IST)

Achanoor is a village in Tamil Nadu, India, that lies between Thiruvaiyaru and Kallanai (Grand Anaicut). The main economic activity in the village is agriculture. It has fertile lands, due to its location in the Kaveri delta region. Rice, sugarcane, bananas, betel leaf, onions, and coconuts are the village's chief products. Neighboring villages include Marur, Sathanur and Vaidhyanathanpettai. Achanoor is 6 kilometres (3.7 mi) from Thiruvaiyaru and 18 kilometres (11 mi) from Thanjavur. Nearly 75% of Achanoor's residents are Roman Catholic. Saint Anthony's Church plays an important role in the lives of the village's residents. Every May, the village celebrates Saint Anthony's Festival.
