= K N Ganesh =

Indian bio-organic chemist

Krishnarajanagar Nagappa Ganesh
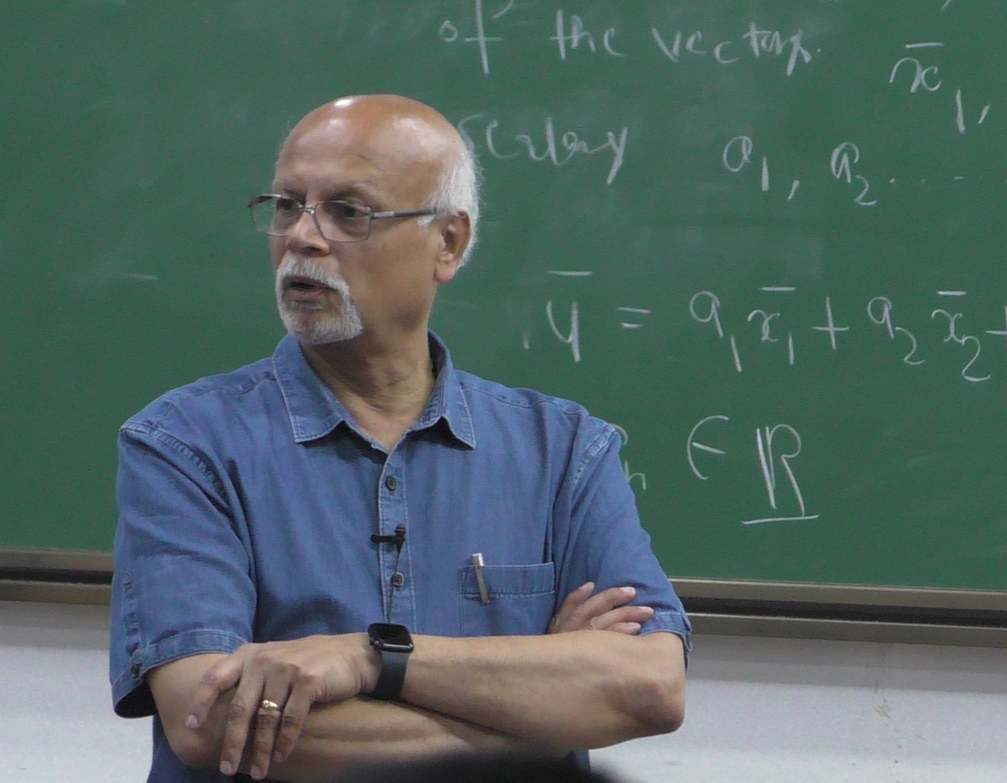
- Dr. K. N. Ganesh c. 2023
- Born: 25 May 1953 (age 73)
- Education: Bangalore University (MSc); Cambridge University (PhD)
- Scientific career
- Fields: Organic Chemistry
- Workplaces: IISER Tirupati, IISER Pune, Centre for Cellular and Molecular Biology, National Chemical Labortory

Krishnarajanagar Nagappa Ganesh is an Indian bio-organic chemist and served as the (founding) director of Indian Institute of Science Education and Research, Tirupati (IISER Tirupati) since 2017 till 2023. He is also the founding director of Indian Institute of Science Education and Research, Pune, that was established in 2006 and served the office till 2017. He is a recipient of the Shanti Swarup Bhatnagar Prize in chemical sciences (1998) for "his outstanding contribution towards the understanding of the chemical principles of DNA molecular recognition and for his work on various facets of DNA structure and its interaction with drugs and proteins". He is also a Fellow of the Indian National Science Academy since 2000.

Ganesh obtained his BSc (1970) and MSc (1972) degrees in chemistry from Bangalore University and did his Ph.D. in 1976 from Delhi University under the guidance of Dr. G.B.V Subramanian. Utilizing a Commonwealth Fellowship, he pursued higher studies at the University of Cambridge, where he secured a second PhD degree in 1980. Upon returning to India, he joined the Centre for Cellular and Molecular Biology at Hyderabad in 1981 where he established India’s first DNA synthesis facility and started research to study new motifs of DNA-protein interactions. In 1987, he moved to National Chemical Laboratory where he rose to become the Head of Organic Chemistry Division in 1994. In 2006, he was chosen as the First Director of the newly founded Indian Institute of Science Education and Research at Pune and in 2017 he was appointed as the first Director of Indian Institute of Science Education and Research at Tirupati.

The research work of Ganesh is related to the chemistry and biology of nucleic acids with special focus on the applications of DNA analogues, structural biology of collagen peptides and DNA nanotechnology. He is recognised for his contributions to the design of Peptide Nucleic Acid (PNA) analogues for effective cell permeation.

== Awards and recognition ==
The various awards and recognitions conferred on K N Ganesh include:

- Padma Shri in 2023 by the Government of India
- Fellow of all the three Science Academies in India, namely, the Indian National Science Academy, the National Academy of Sciences, India and the Indian Academy of Sciences
- Fellow of The World Academy of Sciences (TWAS)
- President of Division of Organic and Biomolecular Chemistry of IUPAC (2012-2013)
- Shanti Swarup Bhatnagar Award of Chemical sciences (CSIR)
- TWAS Prize for Chemical Sciences
- SASTRA-CNR Rao Award of SASTRA University (2015)
- H K Firodia Vijnan Bhushan Award (2015)
- National Researcher Award in Nanoscience and Technology (2016).

The positions that K N Ganesh holds or held include:

- Member of various policy making and Project Advisory Committees of Department of Science & Technology (DST) and Department of Biotechnology (DBT), Government of India
- Member of Nanoscience Advisory Group of DST Nanoscience mission
- Chairman, DBT Taskforce on Nanobiotechnology
- Chairman, Finance Committee of India Alliance - Wellcome Trust DBT
- Chairman of Research Advisory Council of Institute of Nano Science and Technology, Mohali, Punjab
- Founding Editor for ACS Omega, the first open Access Journal from American Chemical Society
