= Sourav Pal =

Indian Theoretical Chemist

- Born: 12 May 1955 (age 71)
- Education: University of Calcutta (Ph.D.); IIT Kanpur (MSc Integrated)
- Scientific career
- Workplaces: Indian Institute of Science Education and Research, Kolkata (2017–2022), Indian Institute of Technology Bombay (2015–2017), CSIR-National Chemical Laboratory, Director (2010–2015)

Sourav Pal (born 12 May 1955) is an Indian theoretical chemist, former professor of chemistry at IIT Bombay, and former Director of the Indian Institute of Science Education and Research, Kolkata. He was a director of the CSIR-National Chemical Laboratory in Pune and an adjunct professor at the Indian Institute of Science Education and Research, Kolkata.

He has made contributions in the field of coupled cluster-based methods of quantum chemistry. He also developed expectation value and the response properties to multi-reference coupled cluster theory, as well as extended coupled-cluster functions. He has developed a non-iterative approximation to coupled-perturbed Kohn-Sham density functional theoretic equations to calculate non-linear properties.

He has also made contributions in the area of reactivity descriptors; he established Hirshfeld population in the calculation of Fukui functions and developed the local hard-soft-acid-base principle for molecular recognition. He also studied anti-aromaticity in metal clusters.

== Education ==
Sourav obtained his master's degree from the Indian Institute of Technology (Kanpur) in 1977 and his doctorate from the University of Calcutta. He worked at the Indian Association for the Cultivation of Science (IACS). He was subsequently a postdoctoral researcher at the University of Florida with Rodney J. Bartlett in 1986.

== Awards and honours ==
Sourav Pal is the recipient of the following awards and honors.

- Recipient of the first SASTRA-CNR Rao Award for excellence in chemistry and material science in 2014.
- Recipient of the Shanti Swarup Bhatnagar Prize in Chemical Sciences, 2000.
- Recipient of JC Bose National Fellowship of DST, 2008.
- Recipient of Chemical Research Society of India Silver Medal, 2009.
- Elected as a Fellow of the Indian National Science Academy, New Delhi, 2003.
- Elected as a Fellow of the National Academy of Sciences, India, Allahabad, 1998.
- Elected as a Fellow of the Indian Academy of Sciences, Bangalore, 1996.
- Received Jagdish Shankar Memorial Lecture of the Indian National Science Academy, 2006.
- Recipient of Bimla Churn Law Memorial Lecture Award of IACS, Kolkata, 2005.
- Dai-Ichi Karkaria Endowment Fellow of UICT, 2004–2005.
- Recipient of the Chemical Research Society of India medal, 2000.
- Elected as a Fellow of the Maharashtra Academy of Sciences, 1994.
- Recipient of the NCL Research Foundation Scientist of the Year (1999) award.
- Recipient of the P.B. Gupta Memorial Lecture Award of the Indian Association for the Cultivation of Science for 1993.
- Received Council of Scientific and Industrial Research (CSIR) Young Scientist award in Chemical Sciences for 1989.
- Received Indian National Science Academy (INSA) medal for Young Scientist 1987.
- Received NCL Research Foundation Best Paper Award in Physical Sciences for the year 1995, 1996, 1997, 1999, 2000, 2002.

== Membership ==
- Chosen as a member of the Editorial Board of the International Journal of Molecular Sciences from 2000.
- Member Advisory Editorial Board, Current Physical Chemistry, Bentham Science from 2010.
- Member, Editorial Board, Journal of Chemical Sciences, published by the Indian Academy of Sciences, Bangalore from 2004.
- Member, Editorial Board, Proc. Indian National Science Academy, from 1 January 2006.
- Member, Editorial Board, International Journal of Applied Chemistry, from 2005.
- Elected as a Life Member of the Society for Scientific Values.
- Member, American Physical Society, United States.

== Notable research ==
=== On hard-soft acid-base relations ===
He has studied various properties of hardness and softness in relation to molecular properties, like polarizability. In 2002, he identified "Bond Deformation Kernel" to be correlated with interaction-induced shifts in O–H frequencies in halide–water clusters. His model used local polarization, which can be described by normalized-atom-condensed Fukui functions, which is the normal condensed Fukui function multiplied by the number of atoms.

=== On molecular properties and dynamics ===
In 1989, he developed theories for describing closed-shell molecules with non-linear electric properties. For open-shell systems, which are marked by a high degree of quasi-degeneracy, he used a multi-determinant description of reference space to formulate a coupled-cluster analytic derivative to compute the non-linear properties. Sourav has also identified the exchange effects as contributions to the static exchange potential of the molecule in electron–molecule scattering. An approximation method to calculate the resonance of molecular anions has been developed by his group. The procedure is based on the analytical continuation method.

In 2003, as an alternative to the Kohn–Sham density functional theoretic approach, which solves the coupled-perturbed Kohn–Sham (CPKS) procedure non-iteratively, Sourav formulated a way to obtain the derivative of the KS matrix using the finite field; the density matrix derivative is obtained by a single-step CPKS solution followed by the analytic evaluation of properties. He has implemented this in deMon2k software and used it for the calculation of electric properties. He also has used Gaussian basis sets and Born–Oppenheimer approximation to study the reactions of molecules. His study led to novel evidence of anti-aromaticity in metal clusters.
