= SASTRA-CNR Rao Award =

SASTRA-CNR Rao Award is an award instituted by SASTRA University, a private and deemed university in the town of Thirumalaisamudram, Thanjavur district, Tamil Nadu, to honor excellence in chemistry and material science, the two areas in which C N R Rao has made great, important and substantial contributions. The Award was instituted in 2013 and the first award was presented jointly to Suresh Das the then Director of National Institute for Interdisciplinary Science & Technology, Thiruvananthapuram and Sourav Pal, the Director of National Chemical Laboratory, Pune on 28 February 2014. The award carries a cash prize of Rs. 5 lakh and a citation.

== Awardees ==
Recipients of SASTRA-CNR Rao Award
Year	Name	Affiliation at the time of the award
2014	Suresh Das	National Institute for Interdisciplinary Science and Technology, Thiruvananthapuram
2014	Sourav Pal	National Chemical Laboratory, Pune
2015	K N Ganesh	Indian Institute of Science Education and Research, Pune
2015	V Chandrasekhar	National Institute of Science Education and Research, Bhubaneswar
2016	T K Chandraeskhar	Science and Engineering Research Board
2016	N Sathyamurthy	Indian Institute of Science Education and Research, Mohali
2017	Baldev Raj	National Institute of Advanced Studies, Bangalore
2017	S Chandrasekhar	Indian Institute of Chemical Technology, Hyderabad
2018	A K Sood	
2018	Santanu Bhattacharya	Indian Institute of Science, Bangalore
2019	G U Kulkarni	Centre for Nano and Soft Matter Sciences (CeNS), Bangalore
2019	R Murugavel	IIT Bombay
2020	J N Moorthy	Indian Institute of Science Education and Research, Thiruvananthapuram
2020	S Sampath	Indian Institute of Science, Bangalore
2021	A K Ganguli	Indian Institute of Technology, Delhi
2021	G Mugesh	Indian Institute of Science, Bangalore
2022	T Govindaraju	Jawaharlal Nehru Centre for Advanced Scientific Research, Bangalore
2022	Sandeep Verma	Science and Engineering Research Board, New Delhi

== See also ==
- SASTRA Ramanujan Prize
