= ACS Omega =

- Discipline: Chemistry
- Language: English
- Edited by: K N Ganesh

Publication details
- History: 2016–present
- Publisher: American Chemical Society (United States)
- Frequency: Weekly
- Open access: Yes
- License: CC BY 4.0, CC BY-NC-ND 4.0
- Impact factor: 5.2 (2025)

Standard abbreviations
- ISO 4: ACS Omega

Indexing
- ISSN: 2470-1343 (print); 2470-1343 (web)

Links
- Journal homepage

ACS Omega is a weekly peer-reviewed scientific journal published since 2016 by the American Chemical Society. The editors-in-chief is K N Ganesh. According to the Journal Citation Reports, the journal has a 2025 impact factor of 5.2. It is an open-access publication, which covers research in chemistry and interfacing areas of science.
