= Avusahibthottam =

- village
- Country: India
- State: Tamil Nadu
- District: Thanjavur

Languages
  - Official: Tamil
- Time zone: UTC+5:30 (IST)
- Vehicle registration: TN-

Avusahibthottam is a village in the Thanjavur taluk of Thanjavur district, Tamil Nadu.

== Demographics ==
As per the 2001 census, Avusahibthottam had a total population of 397 with 192 males and 205 females. The sex ratio was 1068. The literacy rate was 77.03.
