= Naducauvery =

Naducauvery Uthandha Vijayaraja puram
- Village
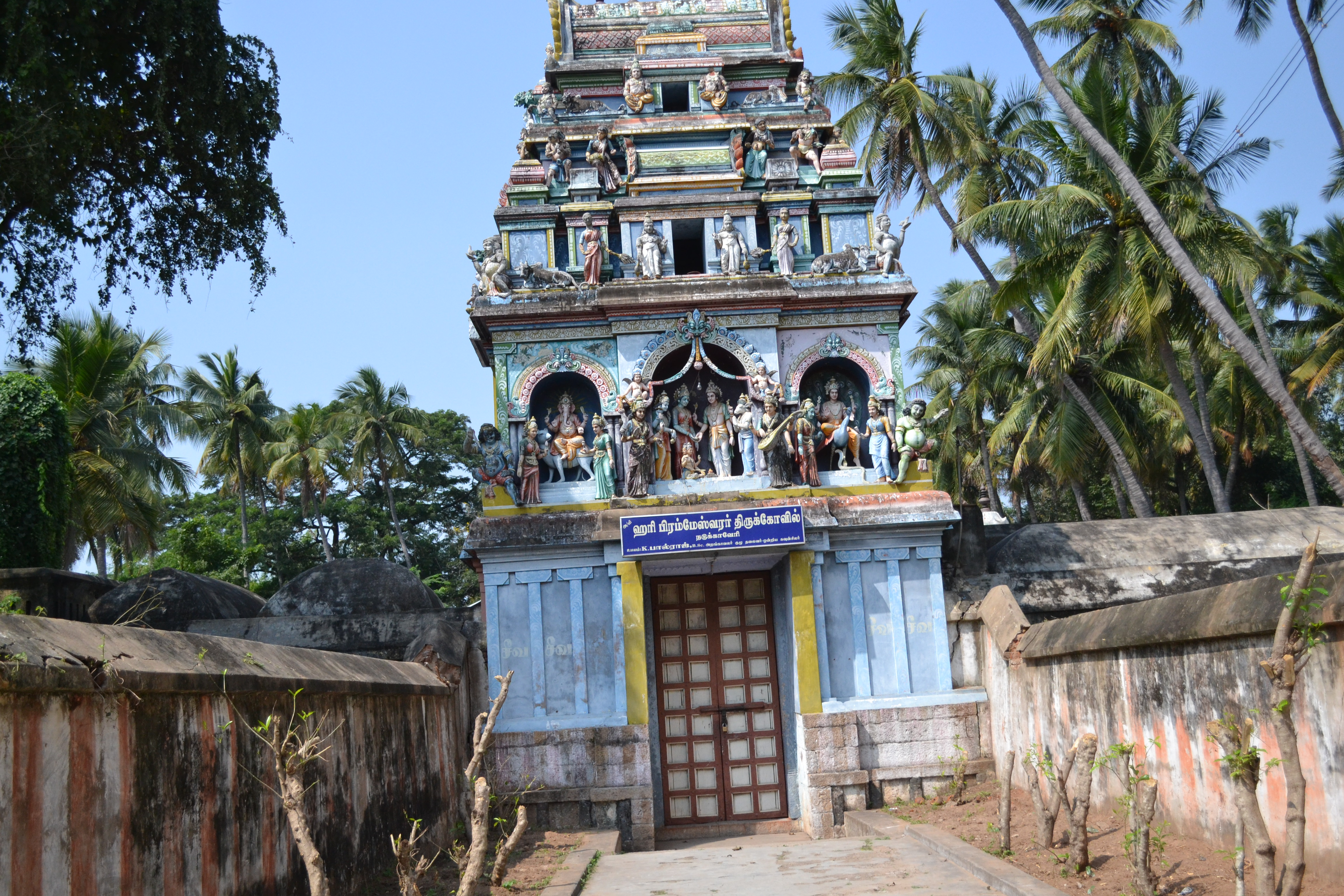
- Naducauvery Sri Haribrammeswarar Temple
- Nickname: Uthanda Vijayaragapuram
- Location in Tamil Nadu, India
- Coordinates: 10.861°N 79.046°E
- Country: India
- State: Tamil Nadu
- Region: Chozha Nadu
- District: Thanjavur

Government
  - Type: Village Panchayat
- Elevation: 49 m (161 ft)

Population (2011)
  - Total: 5,240
  - Density: 1,000/km^{2} (2,600/sq mi)
- about 5000

Languages
  - Official: Tamil
- Time zone: UTC+5:30 (IST)
- PIN: 613101
- Telephone code: +91-4362
- Vehicle registration: TN-49

Naducauvery is a village in Thiruvaiyaru Taluk, Thanjavur district, Tamil Nadu, India. Previously, Naducauvery was known as Uthanda Vijayaragapuram. It is located at a distance of 17 km from Thanjavur on the way to Thirukkattupalli.

== Population ==
The Naducauvery village has population of 5,240 of which 2,428 are males while 2,413 are females as per the 2011 census.

== Literacy ==
As of 2011, literacy rate of Naducauvery village is 88.55% compared to the state average 80.09% of Tamil Nadu. In Naducauvery, male literacy stands at 92.57% while the female literacy rate is 84.54%.

== Famous Places Nearby ==
- Kallanai Dam
- Brihadisvara Temple, Thanjavur
- Thanjavur Maratha Palace

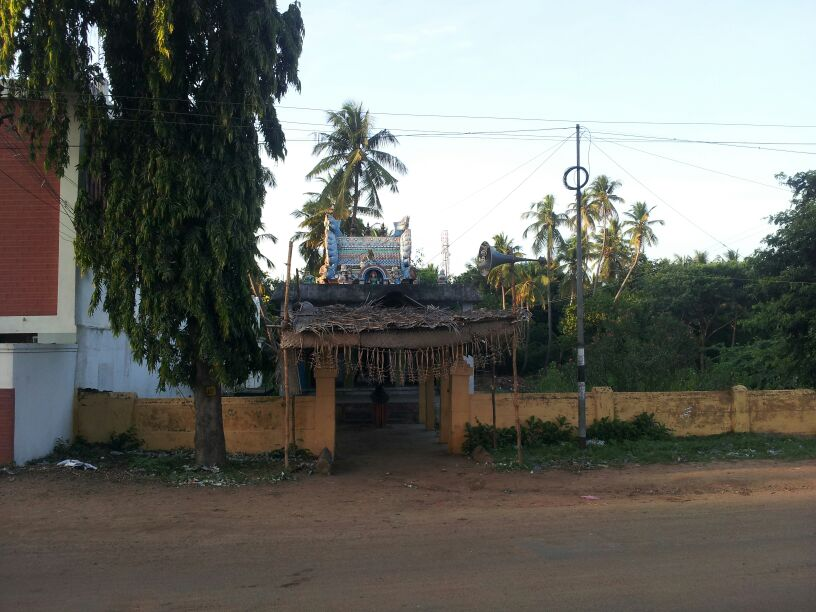

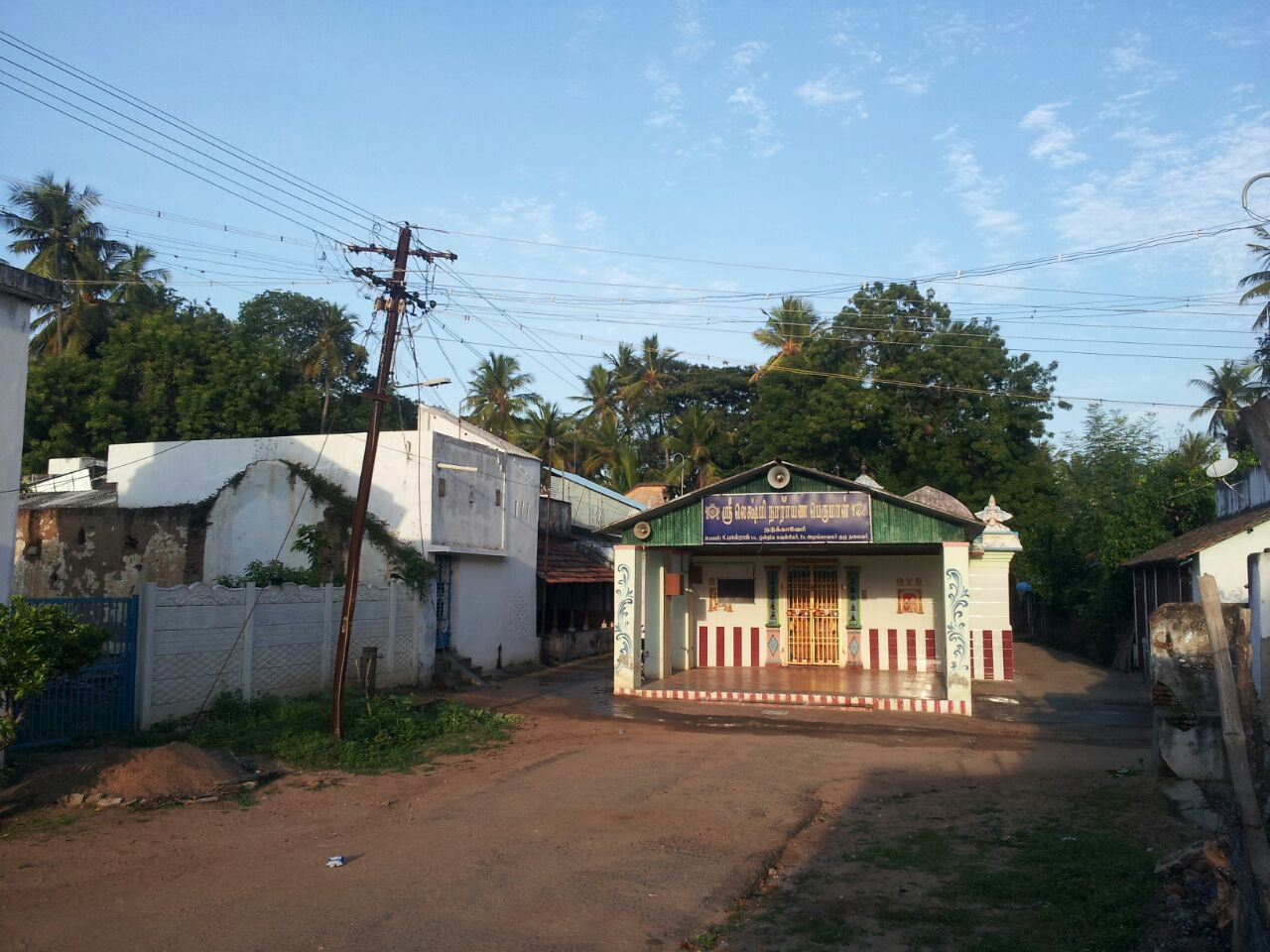

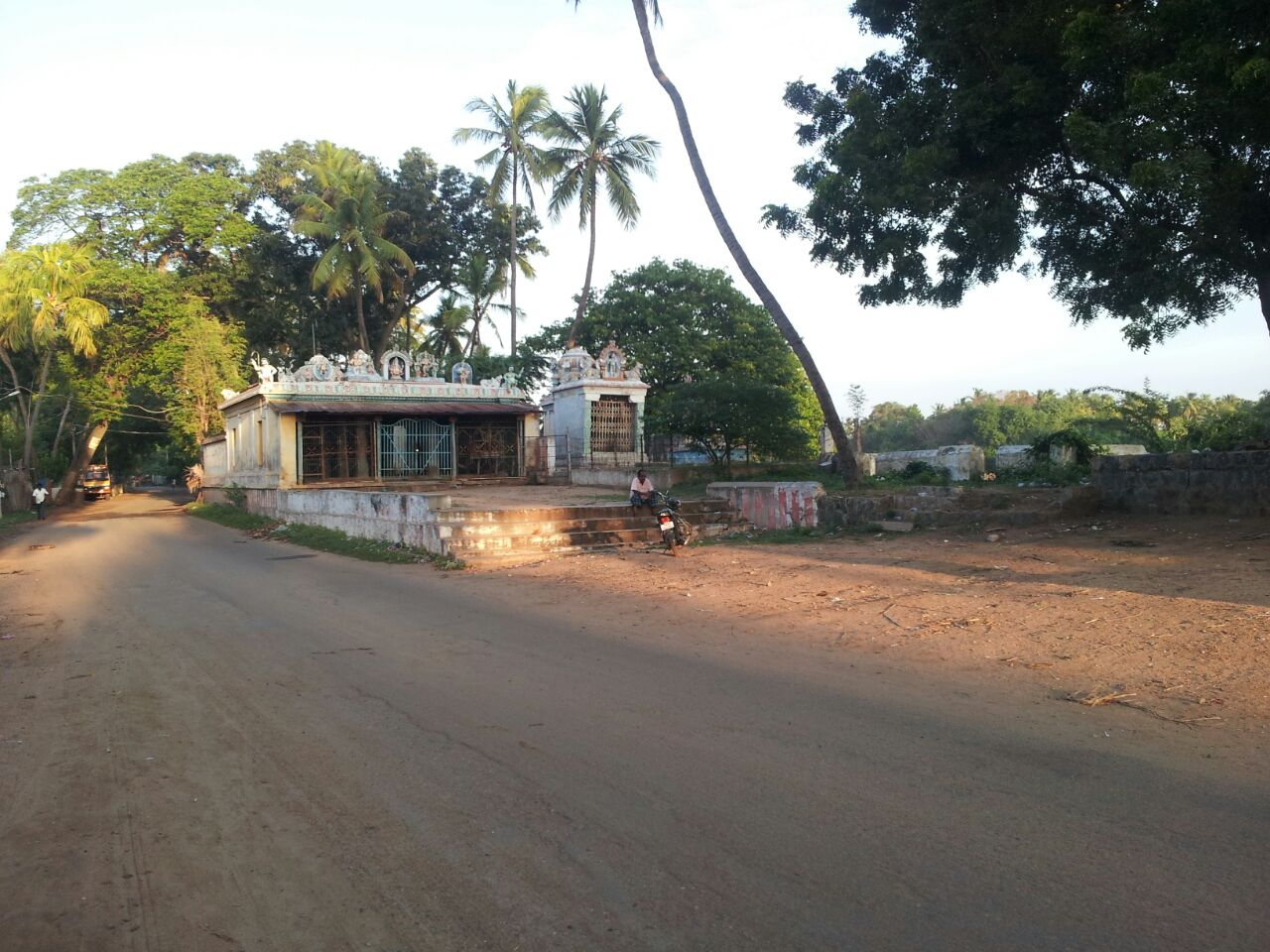

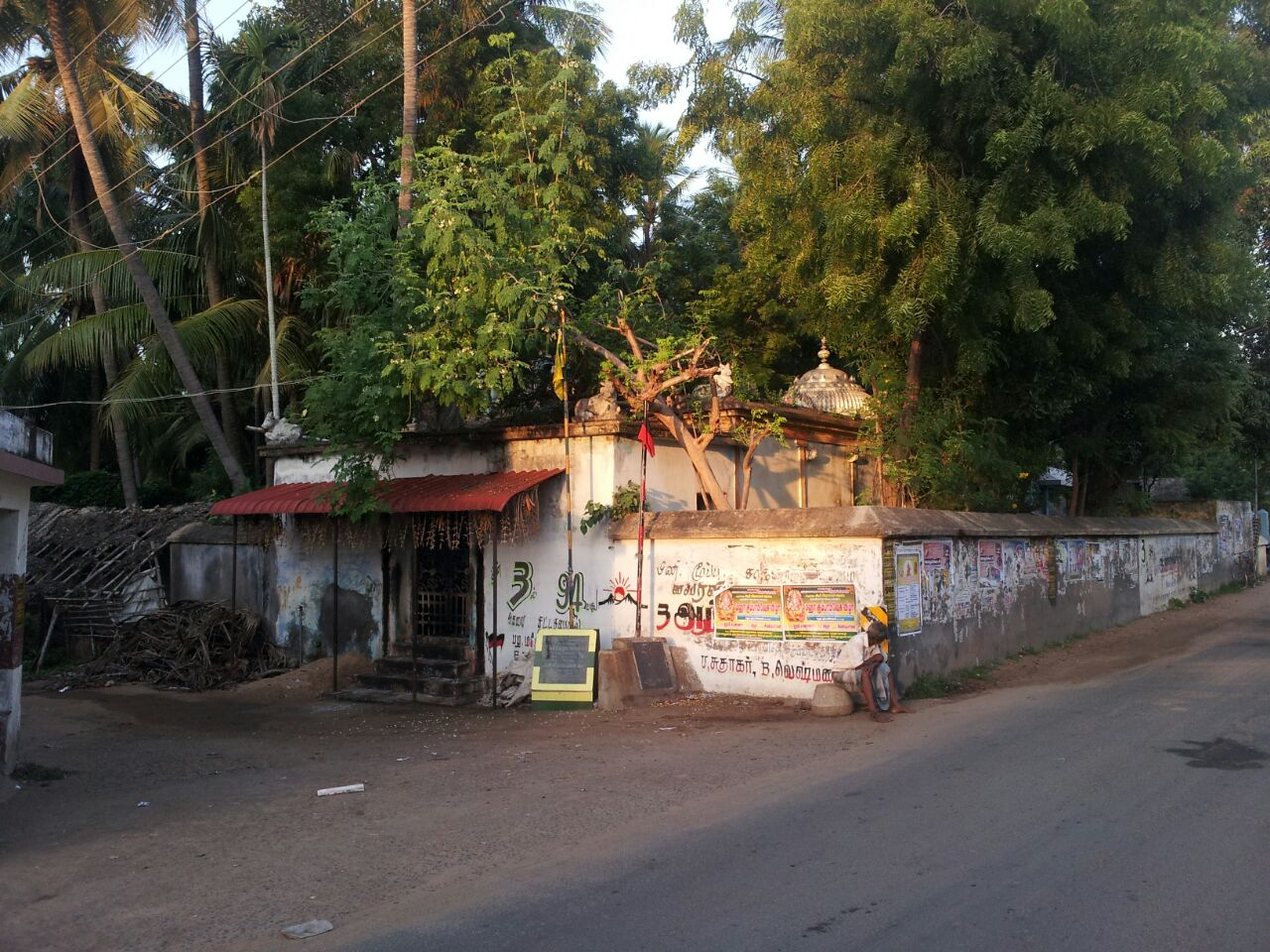
