= Shanmugha Arts, Science, Technology & Research Academy =

Research University in Tamil Nadu, India

- Other name: SASTRA Deemed University
- Former name: Shanmugha Engineering College
- Motto in English: Think Merit, Think Transparency, Think SASTRA
- Type: Private, Deemed University
- Established: 1984; 42 years ago
- Academic affiliations: UGC
- Chancellor: R. Sethuraman
- Vice-Chancellor: Dr. S. Vaidhyasubramaniam
- Location: Thirumalaisamudram, Thanjavur, Tamil Nadu, 613401, India
- Campus: 232 acres (94 ha); Rural
- Language: English
- Website: www.sastra.edu

The Shanmugha Arts, Science, Technology & Research Academy, also known as SASTRA, is a private and deemed university in the town of Thirumalaisamudram, Thanjavur district, Tamil Nadu, India. SASTRA gained the Deemed University status in 2001 by UGC. It offers undergraduate, postgraduate and doctoral courses in Engineering, Science, Education, Management, Law and Arts.

== History ==
SASTRA Deemed University started in 1984 as Shanmugha Engineering College by S Ramchandra Iyer, affiliated to the Bharathidasan University, Trichy. In 2001 it was renamed as Shanmugha Arts, Science, Technology & Research Academy. It was the first institution to get the 'Deemed University status' in Tamil Nadu. Srinivasa Ramanujam Center at Kumbakonam is attached to it.

In 2011, a software company Tata Consultancy Services set a world record of recruiting 1,755 students from SASTRA, the largest recruitment by any company in the world from a single campus.

== Campus ==
The campus is built on 232 acres (94 ha) of land. The total built area is about 195,000 square metres (2,100,000 sq ft), out of which about 85,000 square metres (910,000 sq ft) are hostels, quarters and guest houses. SASTRA will provide totally 119 courses across the 10 streams.

== Ranking ==
University rankings

General – international
- QS (Asia) (2024): 401–450
- Times (World) (2024): 1201–1500
- Times (Asia) (2024): 401–500

General – India
- NIRF (Overall) (2024): 47
- NIRF (Universities) (2024): 28

Engineering – India
- NIRF (2024): 38

Law – India
- NIRF (2024): 14

Internationally, SASTRA was ranked in the 401 - 500 band among Asian universities by the QS World University Rankings: Asia 2024. The Times Higher Education World University Rankings ranked it in the 1201–1500 band in the world and the 401–500 band in Asia.

In India, SASTRA was ranked 40 among engineering colleges by the National Institutional Ranking Framework (NIRF) in 2025, 29 among universities, and 11 among law colleges and 51st overall.

== Festivals ==
The first edition of Kuruksastra was held on 2–3 March 2007. The second edition of Kuruksastra was on 6–9 March 2008.

It started the tradition of hosting musical celebrities for a "Pro Nite" show with singers such as Karthik, Mahathi, Pop Shalini, Suchitra and Rajesh Nambiar. It had over 1200 participants, making it one of the largest such festivals in the country.

== Land encroachment case ==
In 1985, the Thanjavur Revenue Department accused the institution with encroachment and issued an eviction notice. The institute objected and the parties engaged in a long judicial battle. The institute was sent with an eviction notice by the Madras High Court in 2018. The institute challenged this again seeking assignment of the said lands in its name, but the High Court rejected the case and issued a Government Order preventing lands to the assigned to the institute. The Tamil Nadu government on February 25, 2022, issued an eviction notice after the court's order. In September 2026, the Supreme Court asked the Tamil Nadu government to consider providing the university with an alternative site rather than evicting it from the disputed land.

== See also ==
- SASTRA Ramanujan Prize
- SASTRA-CNR Rao Award
