= Vallam Plateau =

Vallam Plateau is a high-lying tableland situated to the south of the town of Thanjavur in Tamil Nadu, India.
