= Vallam Pudursethi =

- village
- Country: India
- State: Tamil Nadu
- District: Thanjavur
- Taluk: Thanjavur

Government
  - Type: Panchayat

Population (2001)
  - Total: 1,130

Languages
  - Official: Tamil
- Time zone: UTC+5:30 (IST)
- Postal code: 613401

Vallam Pudursethi or Vallam Pudur is a village in Thanjavur taluk of Thanjavur district, in the Indian state of Tamil Nadu. It is located at a distance of 16 kilometres from Thanjavur and 4 kilometres from Vallam on the Thanjavur-Tiruchirapalli highway.

== Demographics ==
As per the 2001 census, Vallam Pudursethi had a population of 1130 with 570 males and 560 females. The sex ratio was 982 and the literacy rate, 74.67.
