= Nanjikottai =

- town panchayat
- Location in Tamil Nadu, India
- Coordinates: 10°44′43″N 79°07′44″E
- Country: India
- State: Tamil Nadu
- District: Thanjavur

Population (2011)
  - Total: 32,689
- Time zone: UTC+5:30 (IST)
- PIN: 613006

Nanjikottai is a panchayat town in Thanjavur district in the Indian state of Tamil Nadu. It is a part of the Thanjavur urban agglomeration.

== Demographics ==
As of 2001 India census, Nanjikottai had a population of 21,898. Males constitute 50% of the population and females 50%. Nanjikottai has an average literacy rate of 81%, higher than the national average of 59.5%: male literacy is 86%, and female literacy is 76%. In Nanjikottai, 9% of the population is under 6 years of age.
