= Inathukanpatti =

- village
- Location in Tamil Nadu, India Inathukanpatti (India)
- Coordinates: 10°47′5.35″N 79°8′31.3″E
- Country: India
- State: Tamil Nadu
- District: Thanjavur

Government
  - Panchayat President: Thulukanpatti Sekar

Population (2001)
  - Total: 3,369

Languages
  - Official: Tamil
- Time zone: UTC+5:30 (IST)

Inathukanpatti, also known as Inayathukkanpatti, is a village in the Thanjavur taluk of Thanjavur district, Tamil Nadu, India.

== Demographics ==
As per the 2001 census, Inathukanpatti had a total population of 3369 with males and females. The sex ratio was 988. The literacy rate was 65.08.
