= Grand Anicut Canal System =

Man-made Canal In India

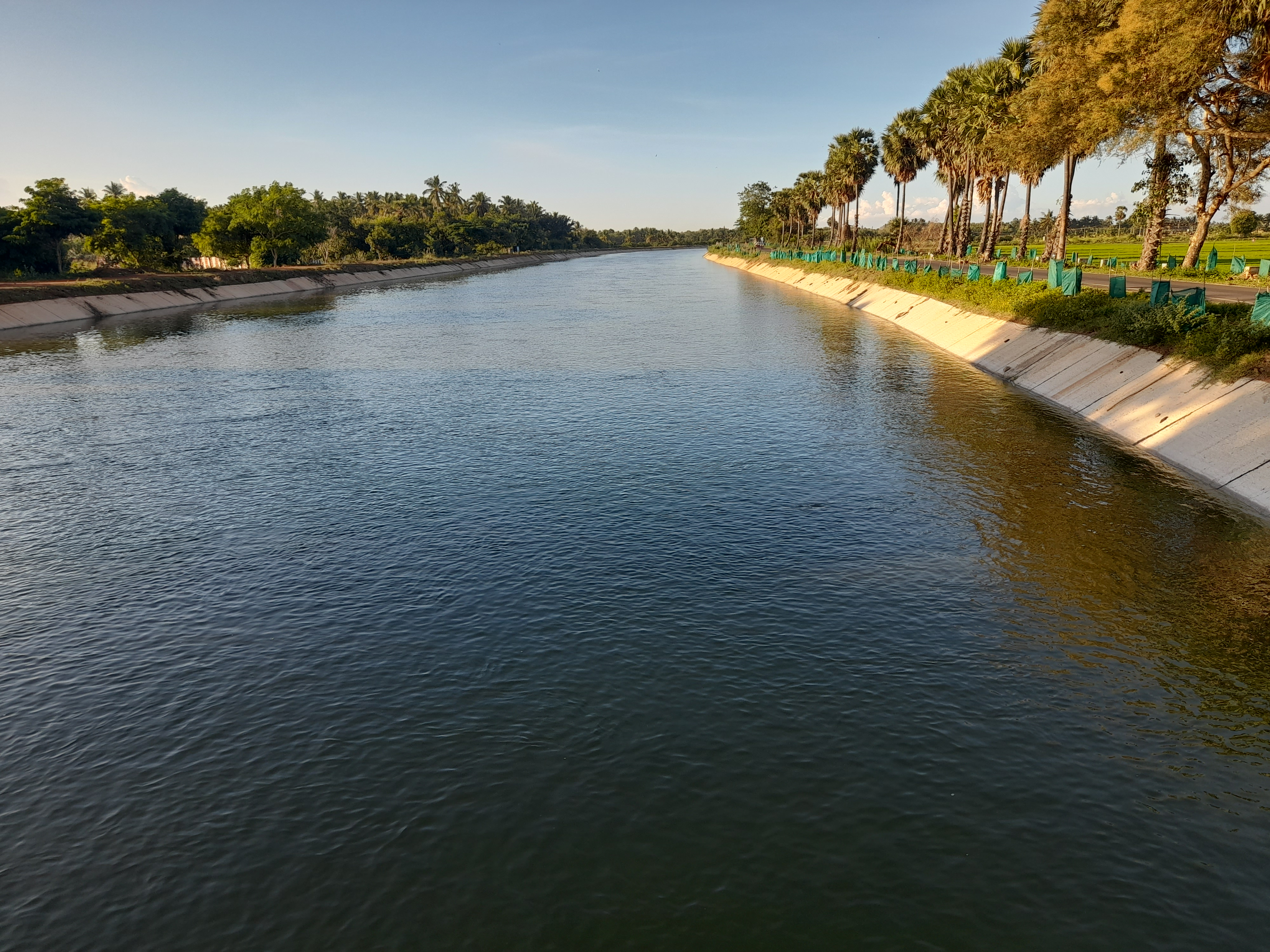
The canal in 2024

Grand Anicut Canal System or Puthu Aru or Kallanai Canal is a man made canal in Tamil Nadu, constructed as part of Cauvery-Mettur project during 1925–1934. British Engineer Colonel W M Ellis, who is also the architect of Mettur Dam, designed this canal on the request of C. P. Ramaswami Iyer, the Diwan of Travancore

The canal starts at the right flank of Grand Anicut (Kallanai Dam) and passes through the Thanjavur & Pudukkottai districts. In Thanjavur, the canal passes near the Brihadisvara Temple. The length of the main canal is 148 km & there are 327 branch canals spanning to a total length of 1,232 km. The canal irrigates 2.5 lakh acres of land.

At its peak, the canal can carry water up to 4,400 cu ft. A mega upgradation project at the cost of 2,640 crore was announced to improve the water carrying capacity of the canal. Public interest litigations were filed against laying concrete flooring as it would affect the percolation of groundwater.
