= Kallanai Dam =

Dam in Tamil Nadu, India

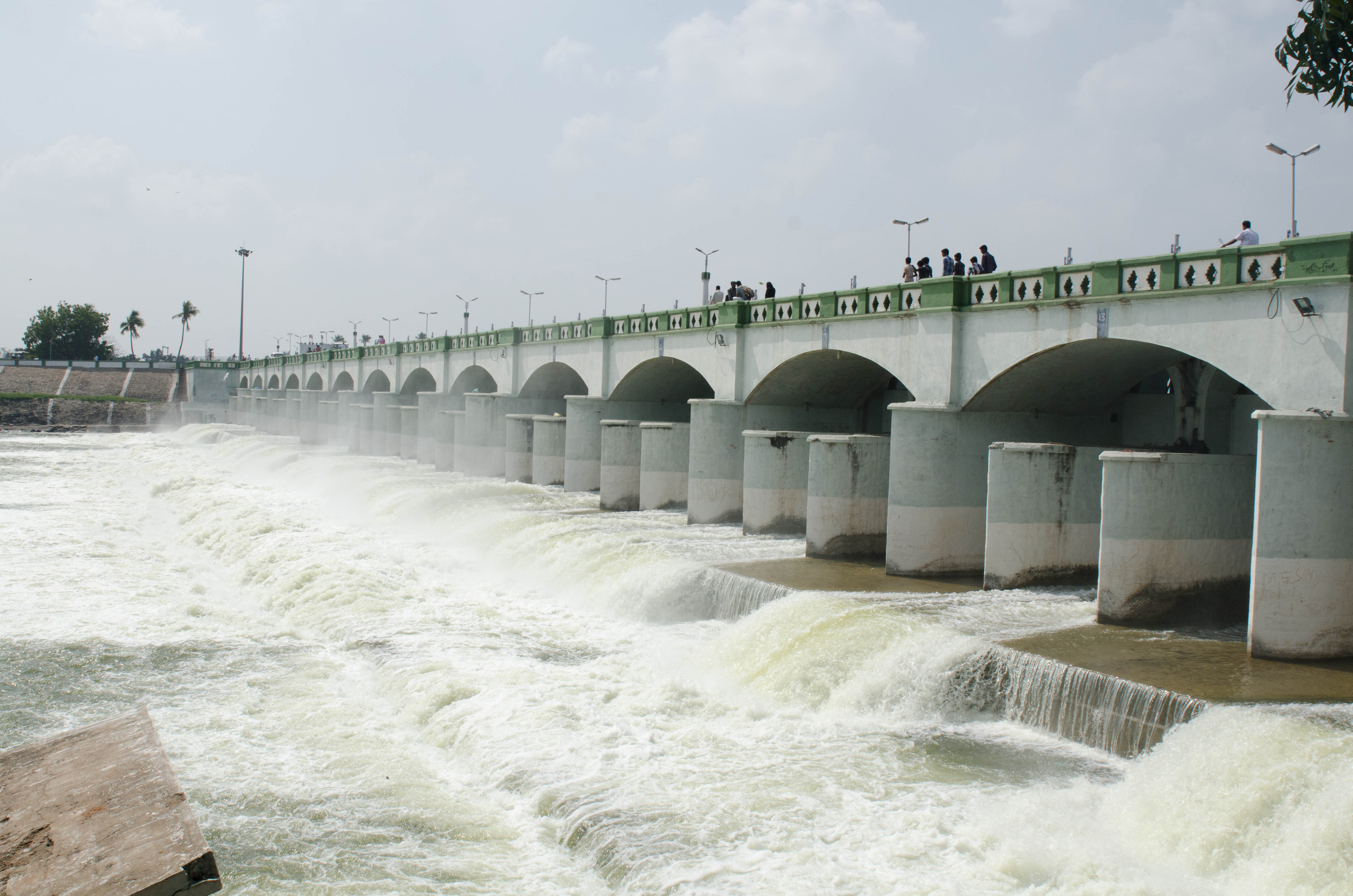
- Kallanai Dam with its floodgates open
- Interactive map of Kallanai Dam
- Location: Thanjavur district, Tamil Nadu, India
- Purpose: Irrigation
- Status: Operational
- Construction began: c.150 BC
- Built by: Karikala cholan of Chola dynasty
- Operator: Government of Tamil Nadu

Dam and spillways
- Type of dam: Barrage
- Impounds: River
- Height (foundation): 5.4 metres (18 ft)
- Length: 329 metres (1,079 ft)
- Width (base): 20 metres (66 ft)

Kallanai (literally “stone dam”, also known as the Grand Anicut) is an ancient dam built by Karikala of Chola dynasty in 150 CE. It was built (in running water) across the Kaveri river flowing from Tiruchirapalli District to Thanjavur district, Tamil Nadu, India. The dam is located in Thanjavur district, 15 km from Tiruchirapalli and 45 km from Thanjavur. It is the fourth oldest water-diversion or water-regulator structure in the world and the oldest in India that is still in use.

== History ==
The dam was originally built by King Karikalan of the Chola Dynasty in c. 100 – c. 150 CE. It is located on the river in Thanjavur district, exactly 14 km from the city of Tiruchirappalli and 45 km from the city of Thanjavur. The idea behind the construction of the dam was to divert the river to the delta districts thereby boosting irrigation. This dam was re-modeled by the British during the 19th century. In 1804, Captain Caldwell, a military engineer, was appointed by the British to make a study on the Kaveri river and promote irrigation for the delta region. He found that a large amount of water passed onto the Kollidam leaving behind a small volume for irrigation purposes. Caldwell initially proposed a solution by raising the dam and hence raised the dam stones to a height of 69 centimetres (27 in), thus increasing the capacity of the dam. Following this, Major Sim proposed the idea of undersluices across the river with outlets leading to the Kollidam River (Coleroon) thus preventing formation of silt. The Lower Anaicut built by Sir Arthur Cotton in the 19th century across Coleroon, the major tributary of Cauvery is said to be a replicated structure of Kallanai.

== Geography ==
The Kaveri river splits into two at a point 20 miles (32 km) west of Kallanai. The two rivers form the island of Srirangam before joining at Kallanai. The northern channel is called the Kollidam (Coleroon); the other retains the name Kaveri, and empties into the Bay of Bengal at Poompuhar. On the seaward face of its delta are the seaports of Nagapattinam and Karaikal.

== Description ==
The purpose of the Kallanai was to divert the waters of the Kaveri across the fertile delta region for irrigation via canals and to its northern delta branch Kollidam/Coleroon. Downstream of the barrage, the river Kaveri splits into four streams known as Kollidam Aru, Kaveri, Vennaru and Puthu Aru. However, the flood waters can be allowed, by opening the barrage/anaicut gates, to pass through the other three delta branches also to join the sea. It is constructed from unhewn stone spanning the Kaveri and is 329 m (1,079 ft) long, 20 m (66 ft) wide and 5.4 m (18 ft) high. The dam is still in excellent condition, and supplied a model to later engineers, including Sir Arthur Cotton's 19th-century dam across the Kollidam, the major distributary of the Kaveri. The area irrigated by the ancient irrigation network is about 69,000 acres (28,000 ha). By the early 20th century, the irrigated area had been increased to about one million acres (400,000 ha).

The delta farmers of Tamil Nadu have demanded the Tamil Nadu government to honor Karikala Cholan, who built this dam.

== Gallery ==
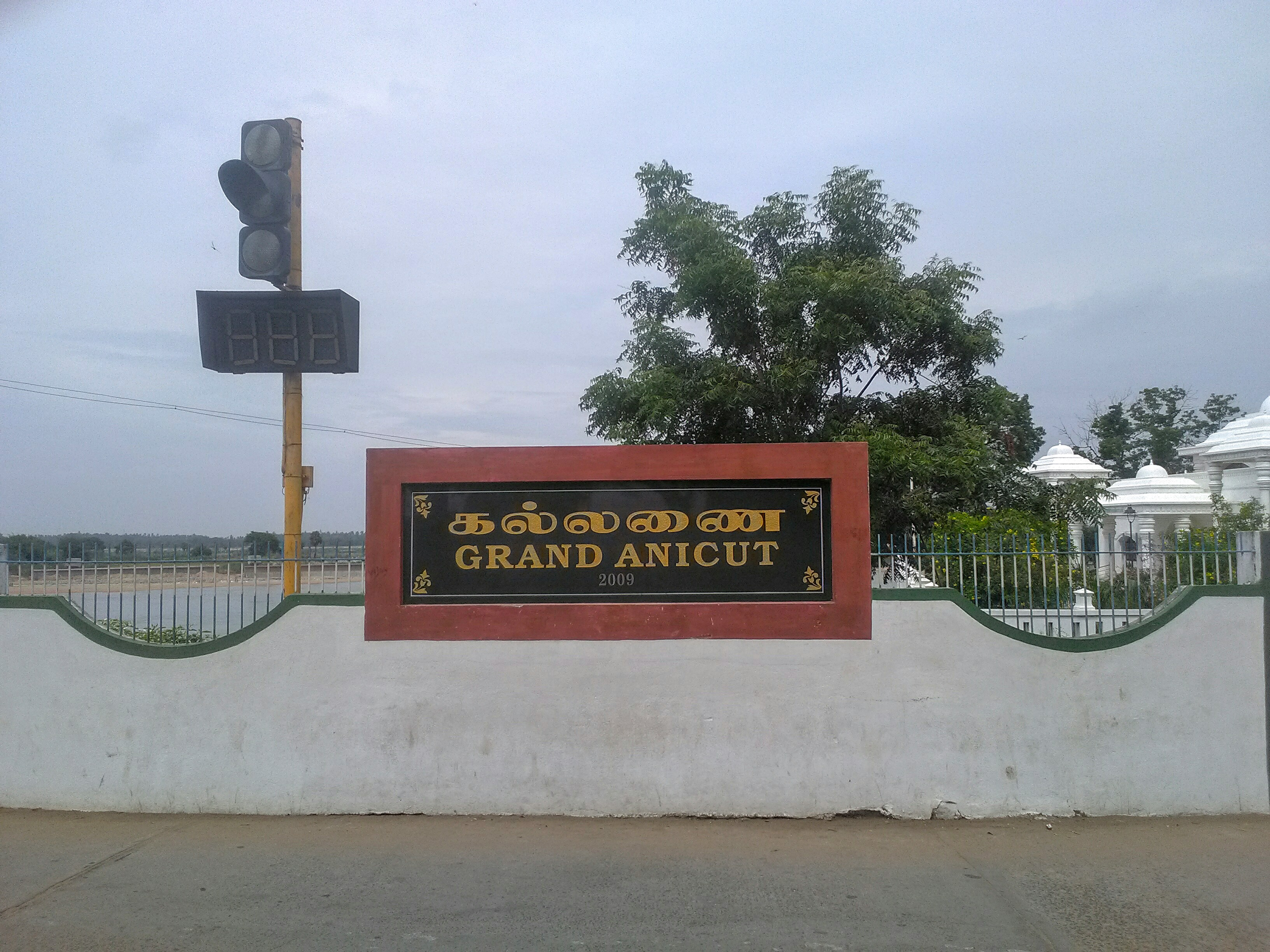
Plaque bearing the dam's name

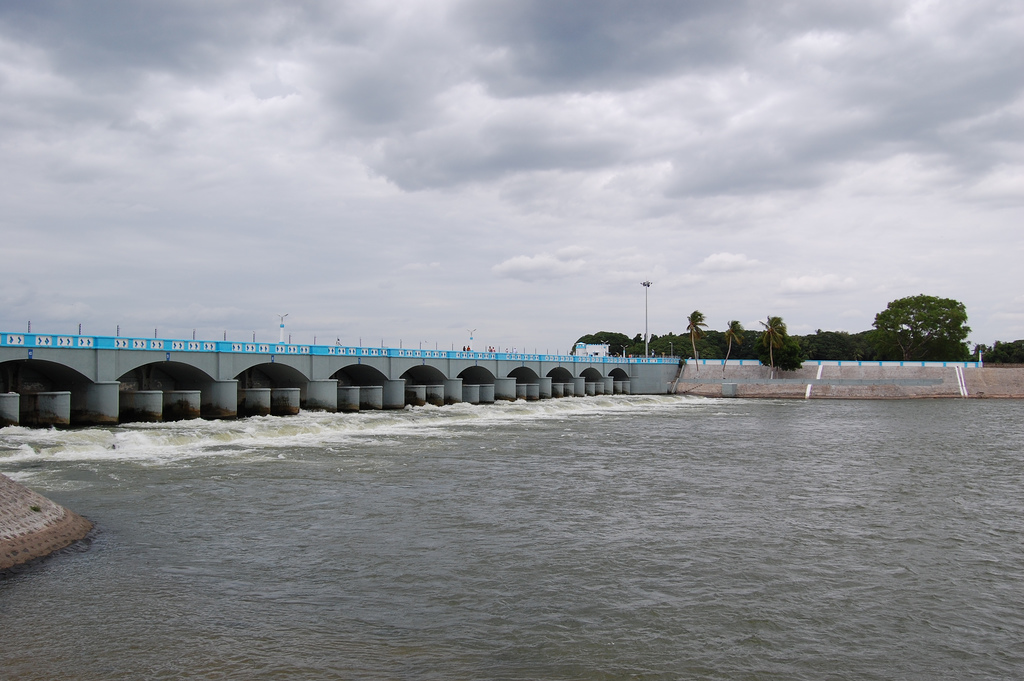
Engineering wonder of Karikalan's period

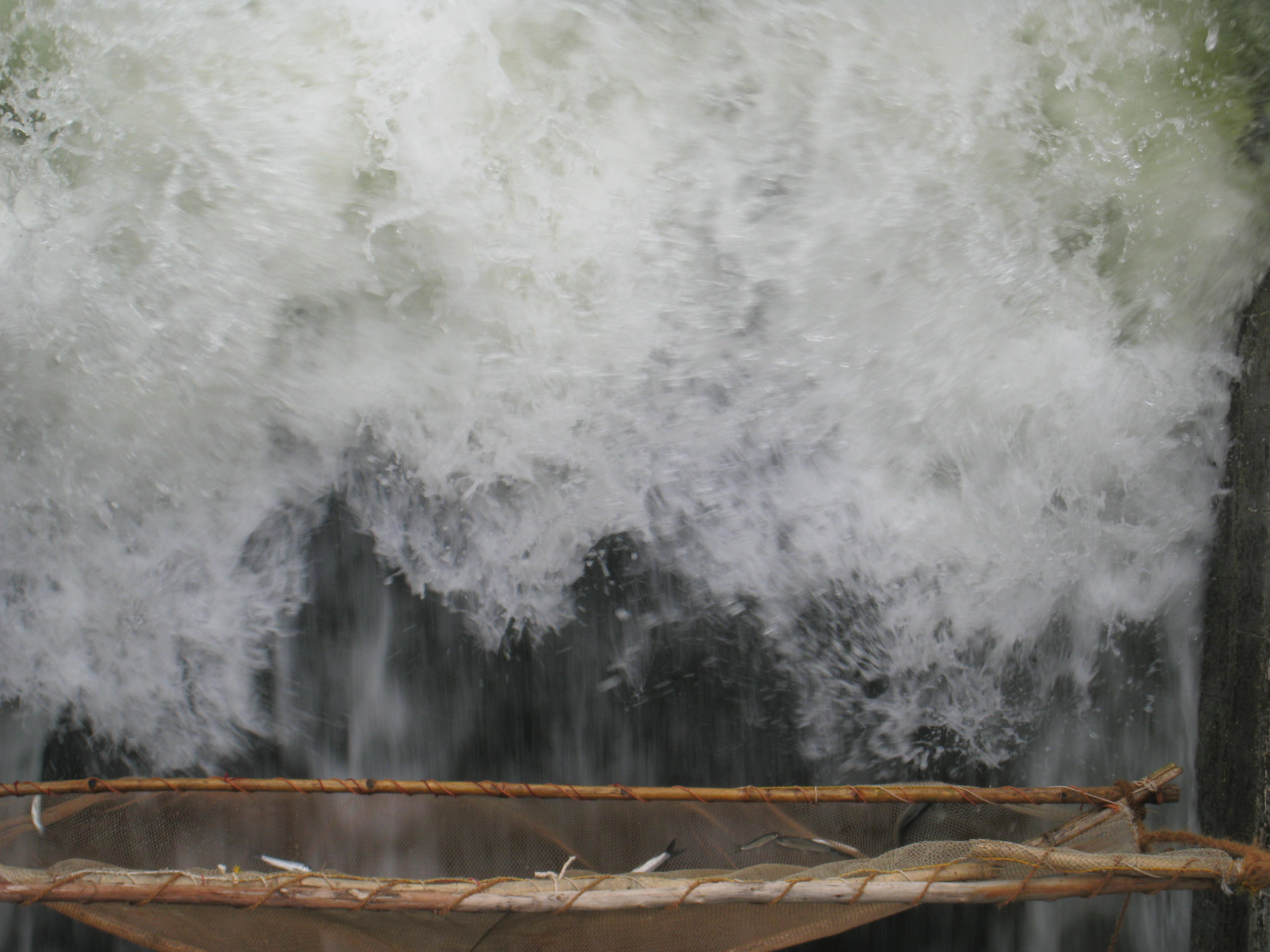
Fishing in the sluices, Kallanai dam, Thanjavur

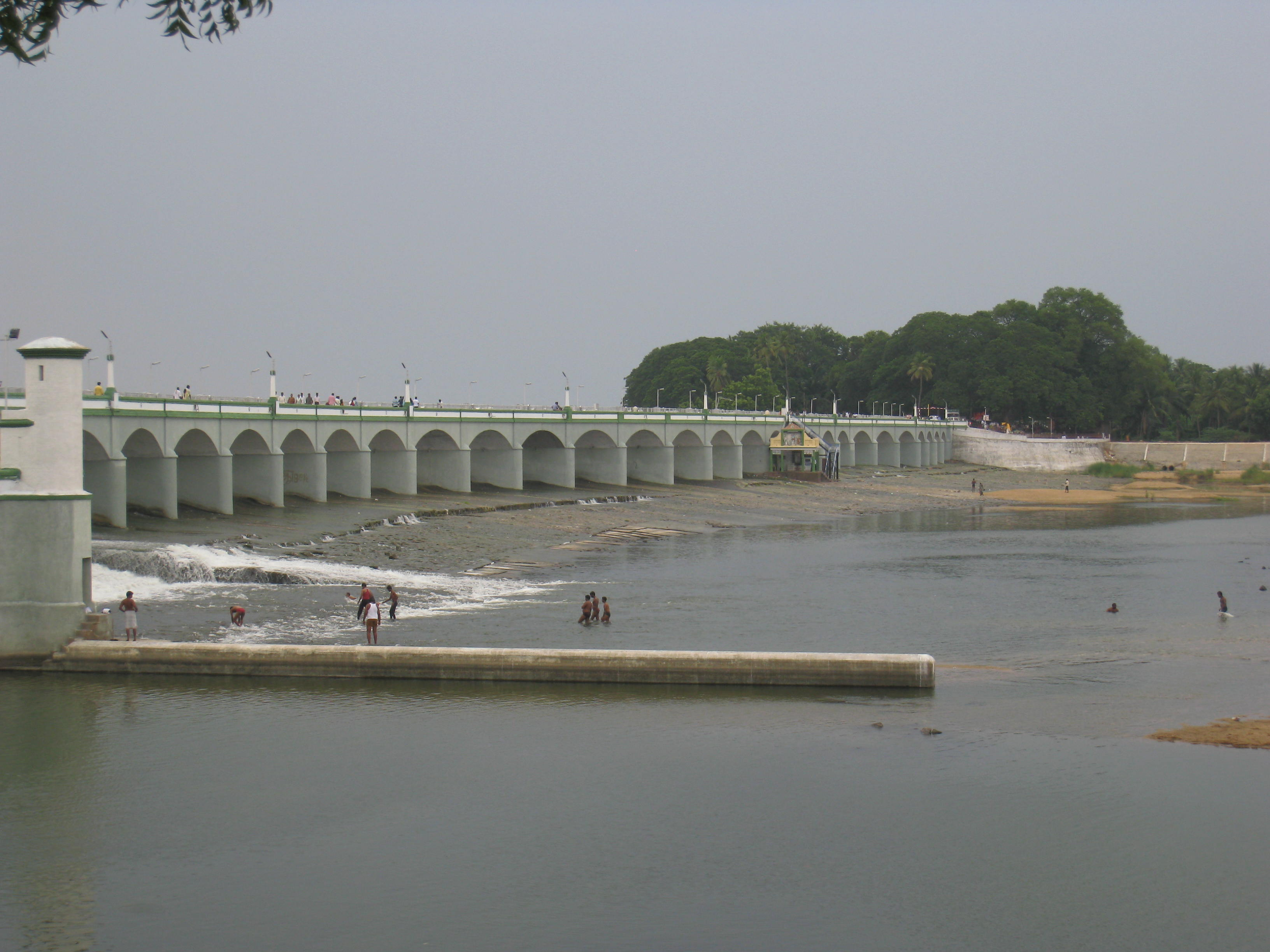
Another view, Kallanai dam

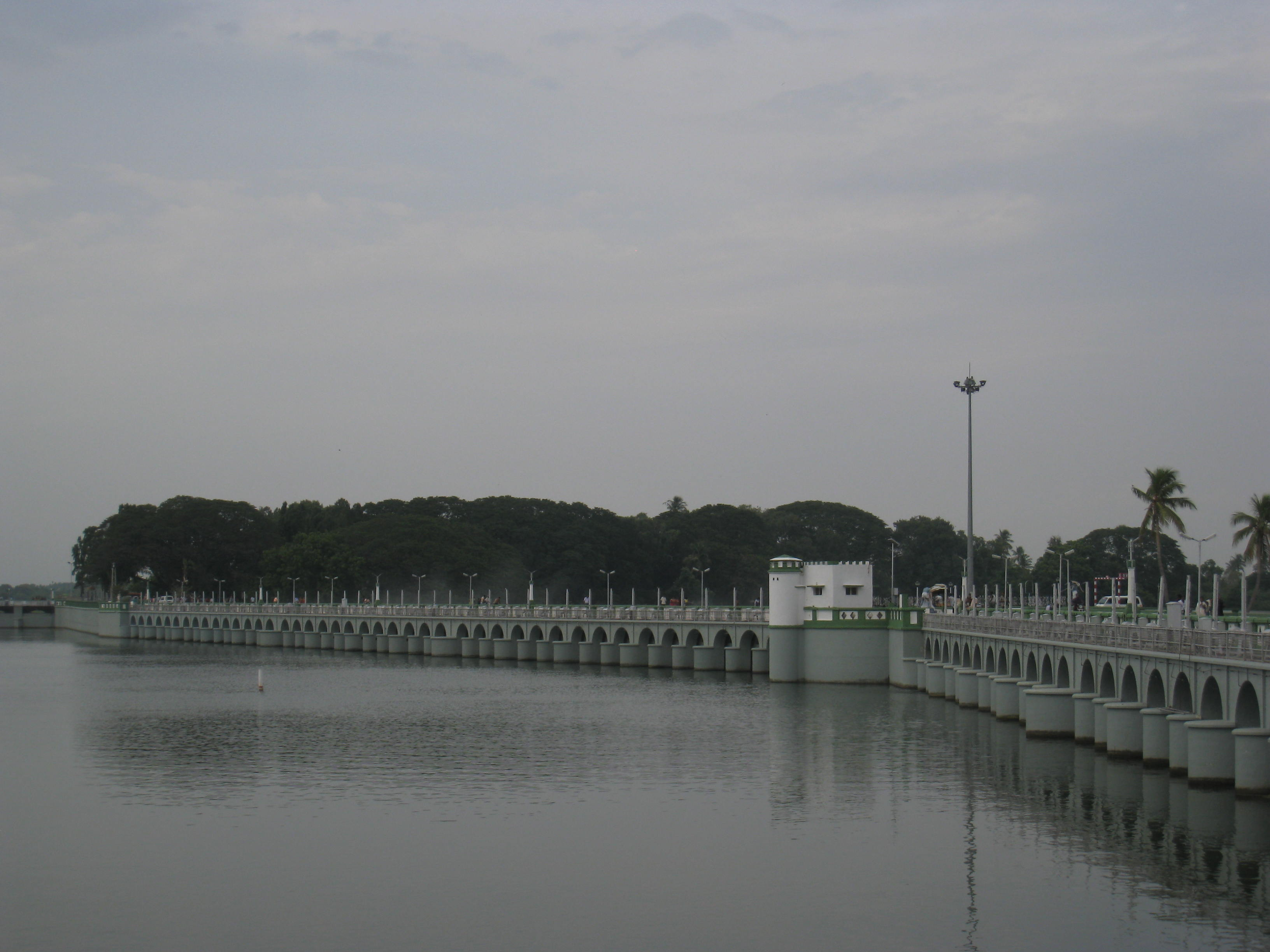
Kallanai dam

Water being discharged from Kallanai in August 2018 witnessing beauty of kallanai in river Kauvery

== See also ==
- Tamil language
- Tamil literature
- Sangam period

== Bibliography ==
- Skempton, A. W. (2002). A Biographical Dictionary of Civil Engineers in Great Britain and Ireland: 1500-1830. Thomas Telford. ISBN 978-0-7277-2939-2.
- Rita (2011). Inventive Indians. Westland. ISBN 978-93-80658-03-2.
