= Thanjavur Palace Devasthanam =

Temples in Tamil Nadu, India

Thanjavur Palace Devastanam is the name of a group of temples attached to the Palace Devastanams, Thanjavur, Tamil Nadu, India.

== Temples ==
There are 88 temples and are found in, around and near Thanjavur. They are maintained and administered by the Hindu Religious and Charitable Endowments Department of the Government of Tamil Nadu. Shiva, Vishnu, Muruga, Kali, Amman, Hanuman and others are the temple deities.

=== Shiva Temples ===
1. Thanjavur Fort Sri Brihadisvarasvami Temple
2. Thanjavur Fort Sri Sankaranarayanasvami Temple
3. Thanjavur Fort Sri Sivalingasvami Temple
4. Thanjavur Fort Sri Konkanesvarasvami Temple
5. Thanjavur Fort Sri Ayyankulam Visvanathar Temple
6. Thanjavur Fort Sri Kasi Visvanathasvami Temple, Located at South Main Street, the presiding deity is known as Kasi Visvanathar. This temple has two entrances one at South Main Street and another at Ellayammankoil Street. It has gopura, mandapa, vimana. Among others, Vinayaka, Muruga with Valli and Deivanai, Bairava, Sani, Dakshinamurti, Durga and Chandikesvara are found.
7. Thanjavur Fort Sri Gurunathasvami Temple
8. Thanjavur Fort Sri Naduvalnathar Temple
9. Thanjavur Fort Sri Mannarsvami Temple
10. Thanjavur Fort Sri Sivendrasvami Temple
11. Thanjavur Fort Sri Manikarnikesvarasvami Temple]] Located at East Street, the presiding deity of the temple is Manikarnikesvarar. His consort is known as Mangalanayaki Amman. This temple has front mandapa, vimana and prakara. Shrines of Vinayaka, Muruga, Chandikesvara, Navagraha, Chandikesvari and Durga are found.

12. Thanjavur Fort Sri South Main Street Visvanathasvami Temple
13. Thanjavur Fort Sri Veerabadrasvami Temple]] Of the two temples located at the East Gate of Thanjavur Fort, this temple is found in the south side. The sculpture of Virabhadra found in Kumbakonam Virabhadra Temple resembles the presiding deity of this temple. It is in standing position. The goddess is known as Nishtambikai. This temple has vimana and front mandapa.
14. Karanthattankudi Sri Vasisteswarasvami Temple
15. Karanthattankudi Sri Meenakshi Sundaresvarar Temple Located at Karunthattankudi, the presiding deity is known as Sundaresvarar and the goddess Meenakshi. This temple has shrines of goddess, Chandikesvara. In the kosta, Dakshinamurti, Lingodbava and Durga are found. In the prakara among others, Vinayaka, Mahalingam, Muruga with Valli and Deivanai, Navagraha, Bairava and Surya are found. The Kumbabishegam was held on 30 April 1990 and 31 August 2007.
16. Karanthattankudi Sri Naganathasvami Temple Located at Kumbakonatthan Street, the presiding deity is known as Naganathasvami and the goddess Akilandesvari. In the kosta, Dakshinamurti and Durga are found. In the mandapa, among others, Vinayaka, Gajalakshmi, Muruga with Valli and Deivanai, Navagraha, Bairava and Surya are found.
17. Karanthattankudi Sri Poomalai Vaithinathar Temple The presiding deity is known as Vaithianathesvarar and the goddess as Balambikai. It has mandapas and two entrances, one leads to the shrine of the presiding deity and the other to the goddess. In the inner mandapa Surya, Sanisvara, Bhairava and found. In the kosta, Dakshinamurti and Lingodbhava are found. Shiva with yogapatta is found in this temple. Gowmari sculpture is found nearby.
18. Vennar Bank Sri Chokkanadasvami Temple
19. Vennar Bank Sri Sundaresvarasvami Temple
20. Vennar Bank Sri Kalatheesvarasvami Temple
21. Vennar Bank Sri Thalikesvarasvami Temple
22. Sri Vijaya Mandapam Thiagarasvami Temple Located at Manambuchavadi, it has sculptures of Thiagaraja and Kamalambal in the sanctum sanctorum. In front of the temple a small chariot like mandapa pulled by two elephants is found. In front of sanctum sanctorum Vinayaka and Muruga are found.
23. Arasur Sri Agastheesvarasvami Temple
24. Punnainallur Sri Kailasanathasvami Temple
25. Aduthurai Sri Dayanidheesvarasvami Temple
26. Darasuram Sri Iravadheeswarasvami Temple
27. Sakwarambalpuram Sri Saptharishisvarasvami Temple
28. Thiruvisanallur Sri Sivayoganadhasvami Temple

=== Vishnu Temples ===
1. Thanjavur Fort Sri Navaneetha Krishnasvami Temple
2. Thanjavur Fort Sri Vijaya Ramasvami Temple
3.Thanjavur Fort Sri Booloka Krishnan Temple
4.Thanjavur Fort Sri Prasanna Venkatesa Perumal Temple
5. Thanjavur Fort Sri Govindarajaperumal Temple
6. Thanjavur Fort Sri Bazaar Ramasvami Temple
7. Thanjavur Fort Sri Kaliyuga Venkatesa Perumal Temple
8. Thanjavur Fort Sri Varadarajaperumal Temple
9. Thanjavur Fort Sri Keelasinga Perumal Temple
10. Thanjavur Fort Sri Keela Kothandaramasvami Temple
11. Thanjavur Fort Sri Bajana Salai Vitoba Temple
12. Thanjavur Fort Sri Vallam Pattabiramar Temple
13. Thanjavur Fort Sri Adi Kesava Perumal Temple
14. Thanjavur Fort Sri Madana Gopalasvami Temple
15. Thanjavur Fort Sri 108 Thirupathi
16. Thanjavur Fort Sri Janarthana Perumal Temple
17. Thanjavur Fort Sri Kalanjiyam Lakshmi Temple
18. Thanjavur Fort Sri Amirtha Venkatesar Temple
19. Thanjavur Fort Sri Darpoora Varadarajar Temple
20. Karanthattankudi Sri Padithurai Venkatesa Perumal Temple
21. Vennar Bank Sri Melasinga Perumal Temple
22. Vennar Bank Sri Manikunna Perumal Temple
23. Vennar Bank Sri Neelamega Perumal Temple
24. Vennar Bank Sri Kalyana Venkatesa Perumal Temple
25. Vennar Bank Sri Velur Varadarajar Temple
26. Trivadi Sri Venugopalasvami Temple
27. Thanjavur Fort Sri Triambakeswarasvami Temple
28. Thanjavur Fort Sri Melavasal Ranganathasvami Temple
29. PunnainallurSri Kothandaramaswami Temple

=== Vinayaka Temples ===
1.Thanjavur Fort Sri Balaganapati Temple
2.Thanjavur Fort Sri Thopparankatti Pillayar Temple]] Located on the way to Ellaiamman Temple from South Rampart, this temple is also known as Thanjavur Pillayar Alakeswaram and Thoppul Pillayar. This is the first temple built during the period of Vijayanagar rulers. To reach the sanctum sanctorum, facing west, one has to go on so many steps before the presiding deity, balipeetam is found. Very near to this temple another Thoppul Pillayar Temple is found, which does not fall in this category.
3.Thanjavur Fort Sri Arkasalai Pillayar Temple]] This temple is located in the Kaliamman Temple complex at South Street, on the right side of the Kaliamman Temple, which has a separate entrance. It has a mandapa and sanctum sanctorum. This temple is also known as Thanjavur Pillayar Alakeswaram and Thoppul Pillayar.
4.Thanjavur Fort Sri Sivagangai Pillayar Temple
5.Thanjavur Fort Sri Sannathi Pillayar Temple
6. Thanjavur Fort Sri Melavasal Subramaniasvami Temple : Located at West street, the temple has Muruga with his consorts Valli and Deivanai in the sanctum sanctorum. It has front mandapa, vimana and prakara. To reach the sanctum Sanctorum one has to go through 18 steps. Shrines of Kasi Visvanatha and Visalakshi are found. In front of the sanctum sanctorum in the right Vinayaka and left Idumban are found. In the prakara Vinayaka and Nagas are found.
7. Thanjavur Fort Sri Omali Pillayar Temple Located near Konganesvarar Temple at West Street this temple has mandapa and sanctum sanctorum. To the left is the Urchavakodi Amman Temple. The two temples have two separate entrances.
8. Thanjavur Fort Sri Naganatha Pillayar Temple Located at West street, this temple has front mandapa, sanctum sanctorum, vimana, and outer prakara.
9. Thanjavur Fort Sri Vellai Pillayar Temple Located in East Gate, Vellai Pillayar is also known as Vallabai Vinayakar as he is found with Vallabai. This temple might have been built during the period of Thanjavur Nayaks. During the period of Vijaya Raghava Nayak, the last Nayak king, a book on this deity known as Vellai Pillayar Kuravanji was written. In 1948 by efforts of Padakatchery Swamy the Mahasamprokshanam also known as Kumbhabhishekham was held. Later during 1982 and 1999 Kumbhabhishekham was held. The latest Kumbhabhishekham was held on 15 September 2014
10. Thanjavur Fort Sri Anada Pillayar Temple
11. Thanjavur Fort Sri Chathurbuja Pillayar Temple
12. Karanthattankudi Sri Sitthi Vinayakarsami Temple Located at Karanthattankudi this temple has rajagopura, front mandapa, vimana, and sanctum sanctorum. After rajagopura, balipeeta is found. In the inner mandapa paintings of Vinayaka are found on either side.
13. Thiruvidaimarudur Sri Narthana Vinayagasvami Temple

Mahasamprokshanam of Vellai Vinayakar Temple

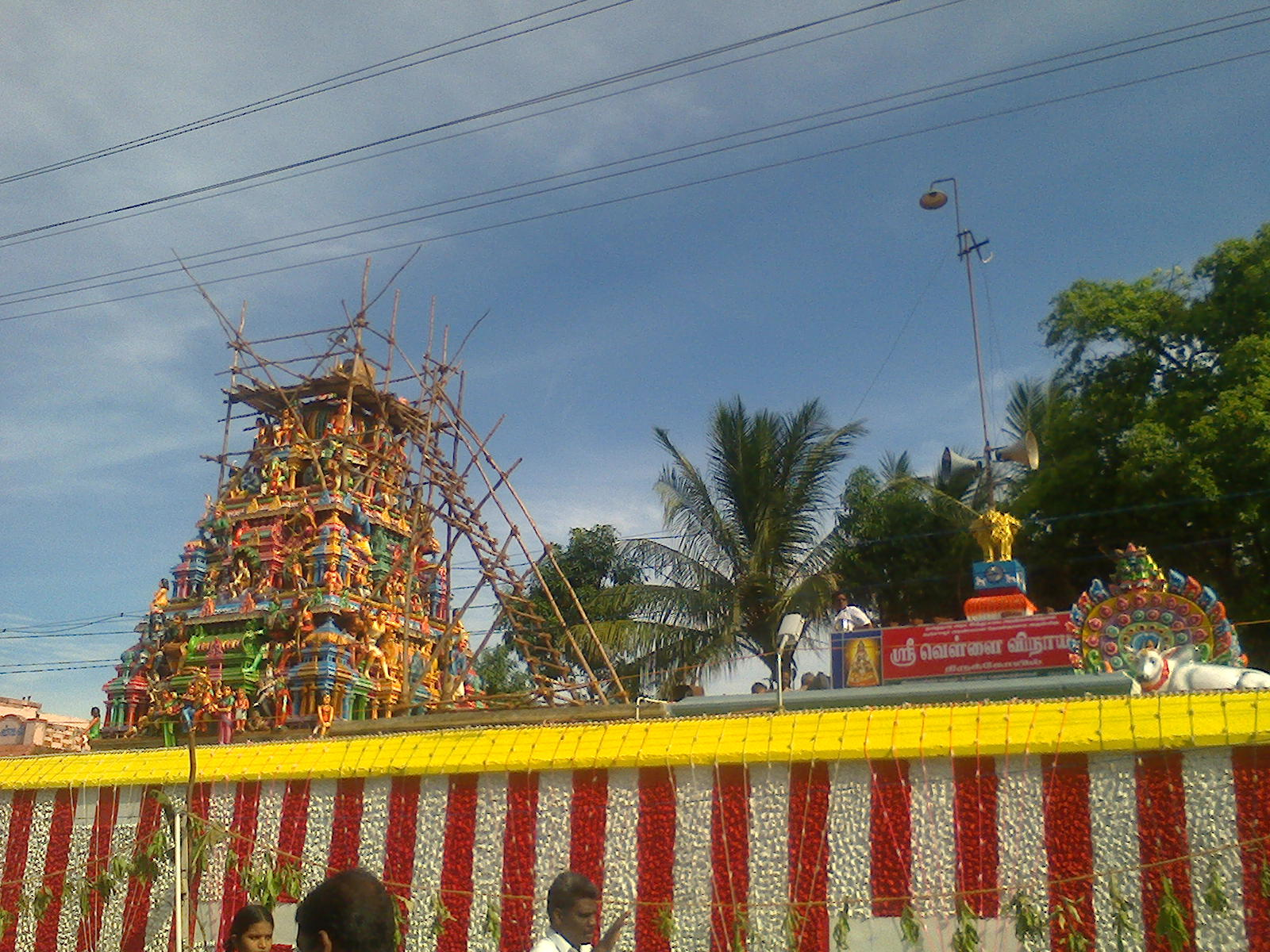

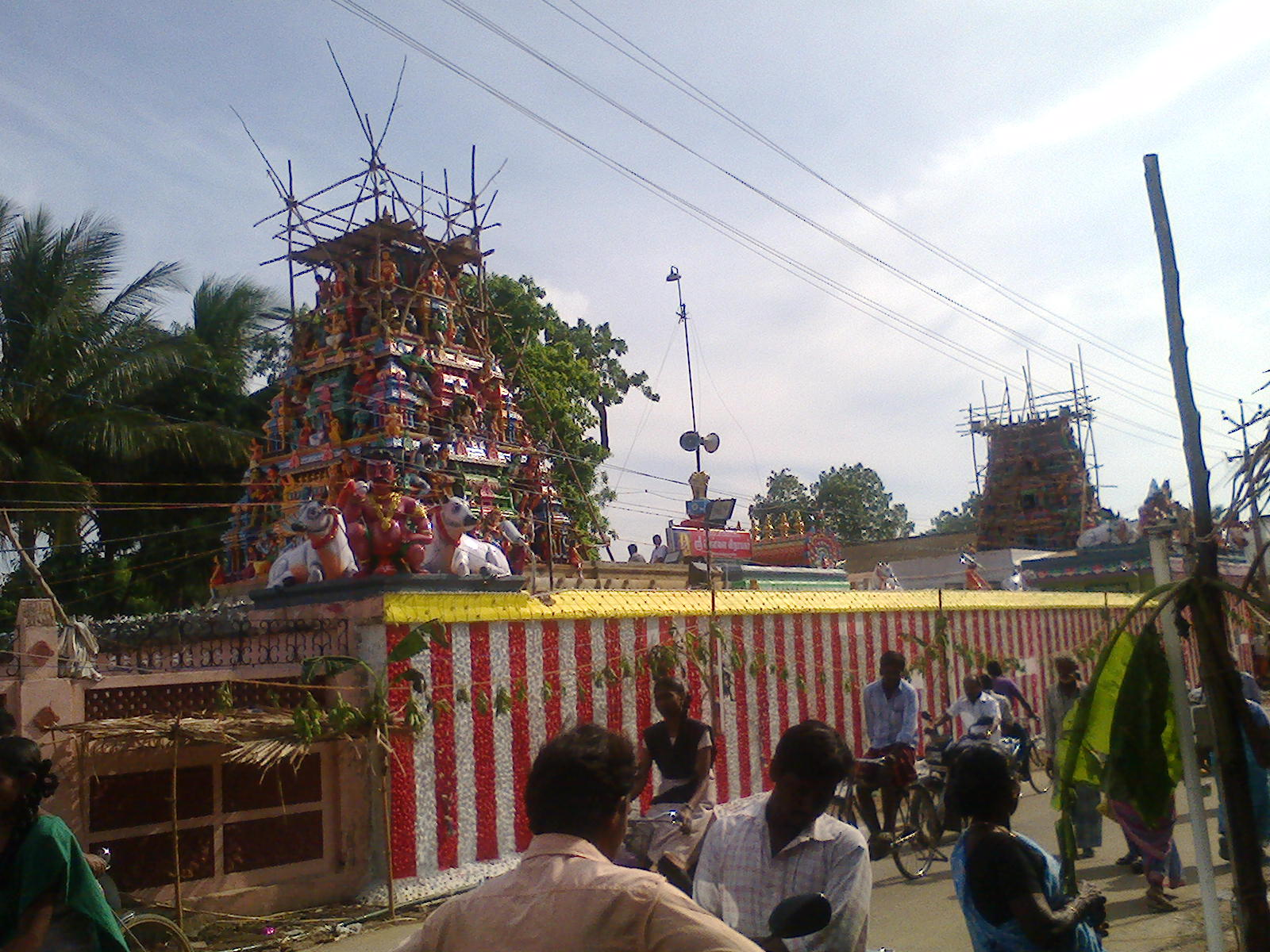

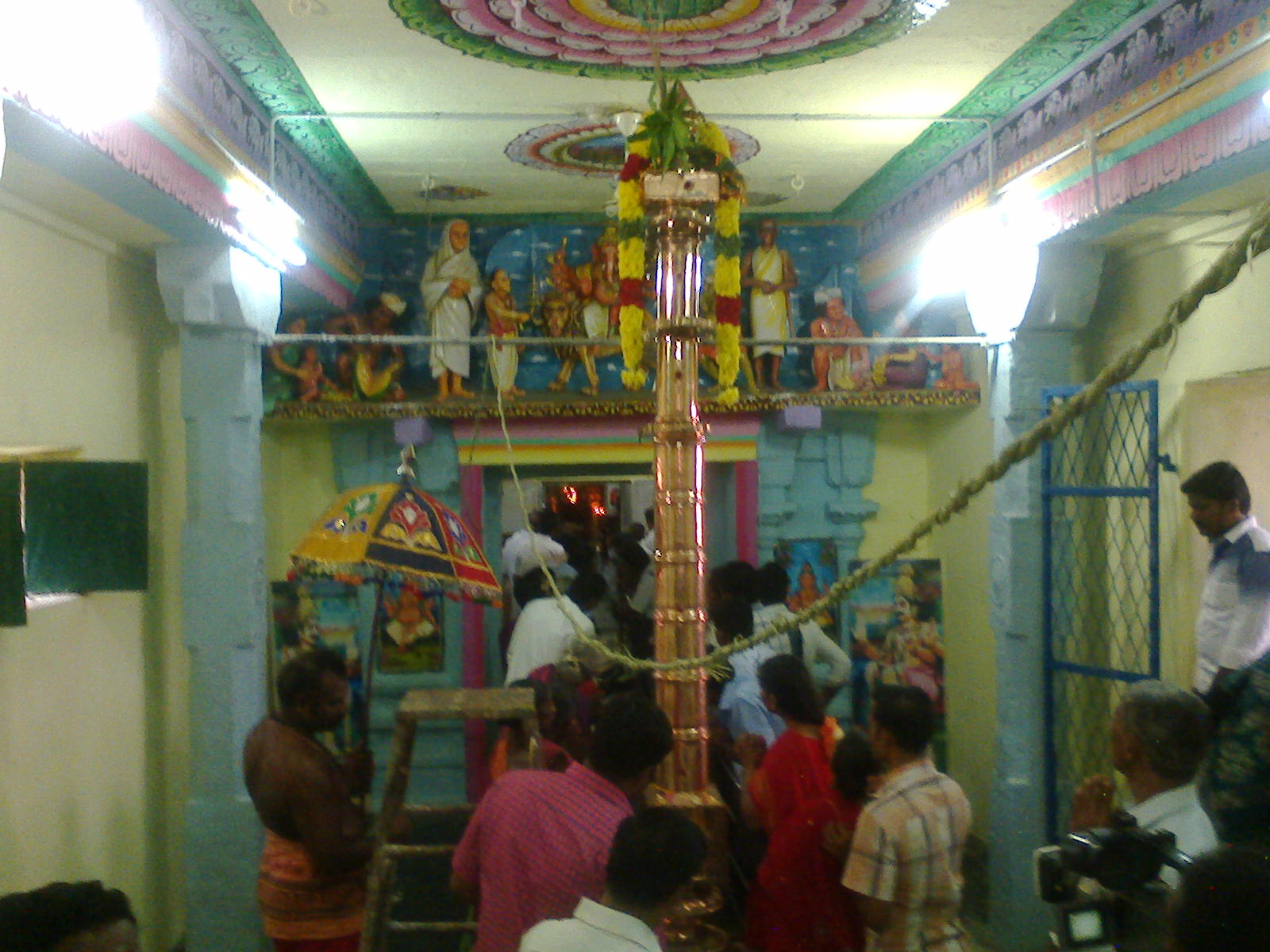

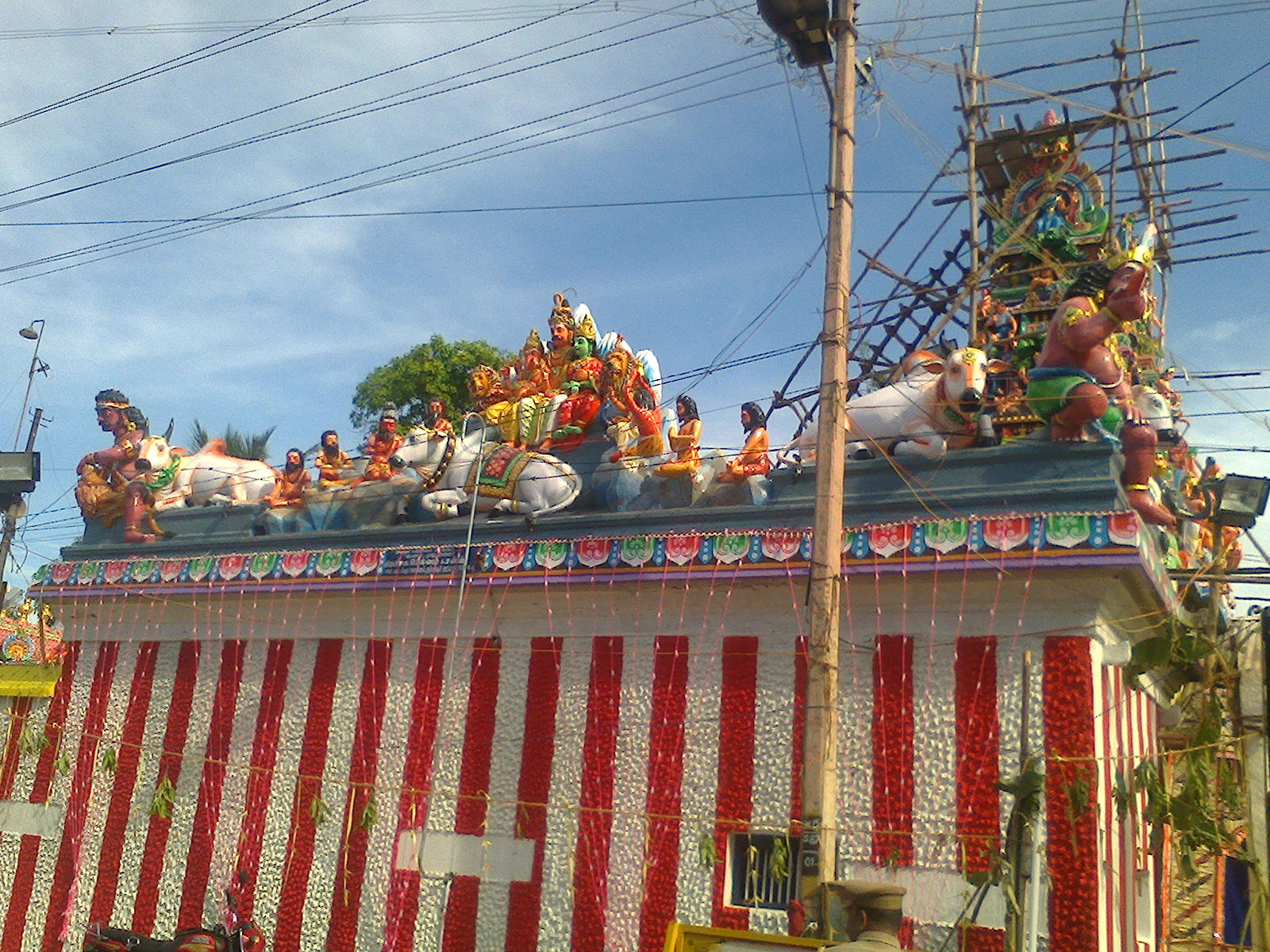

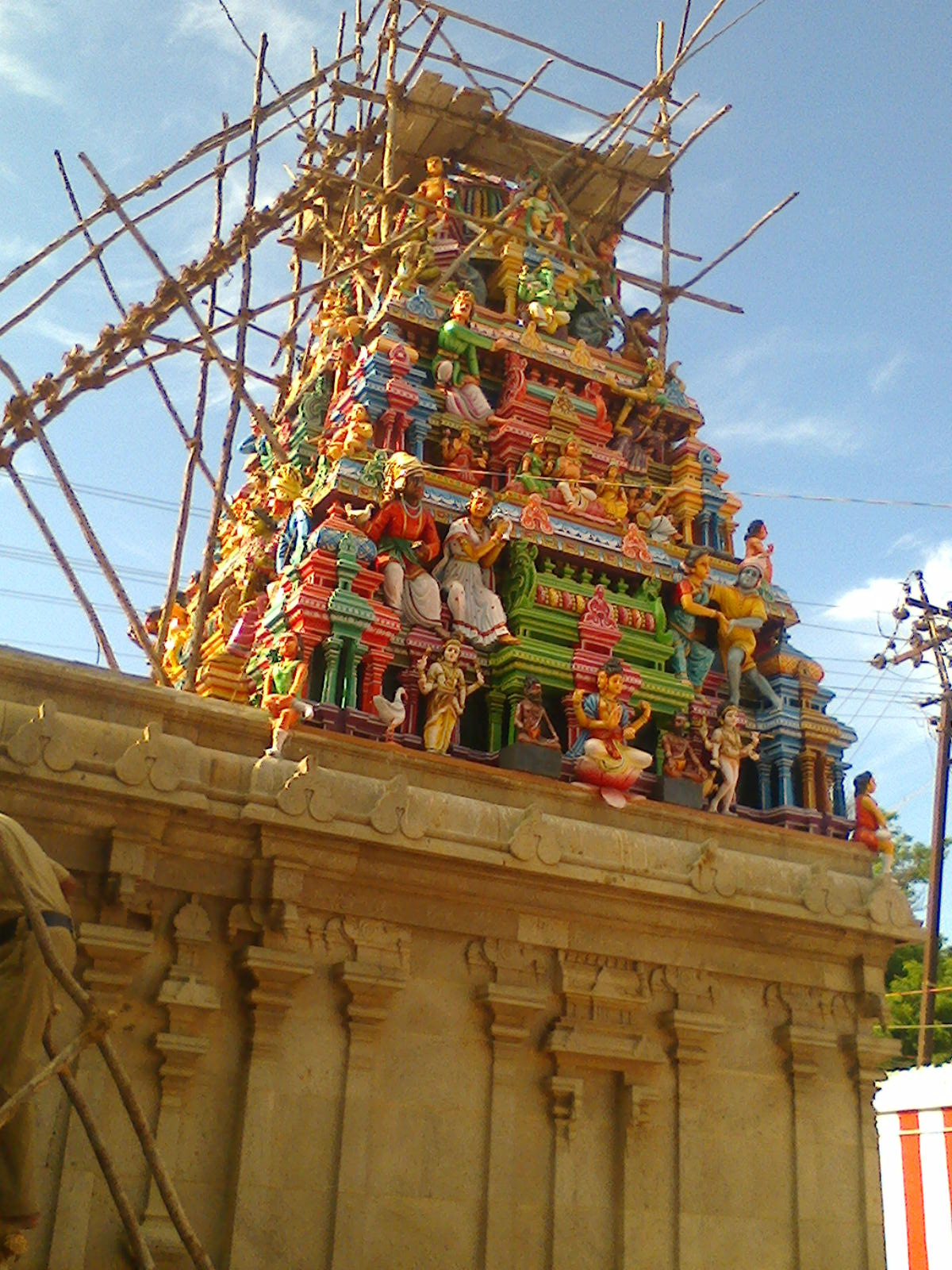

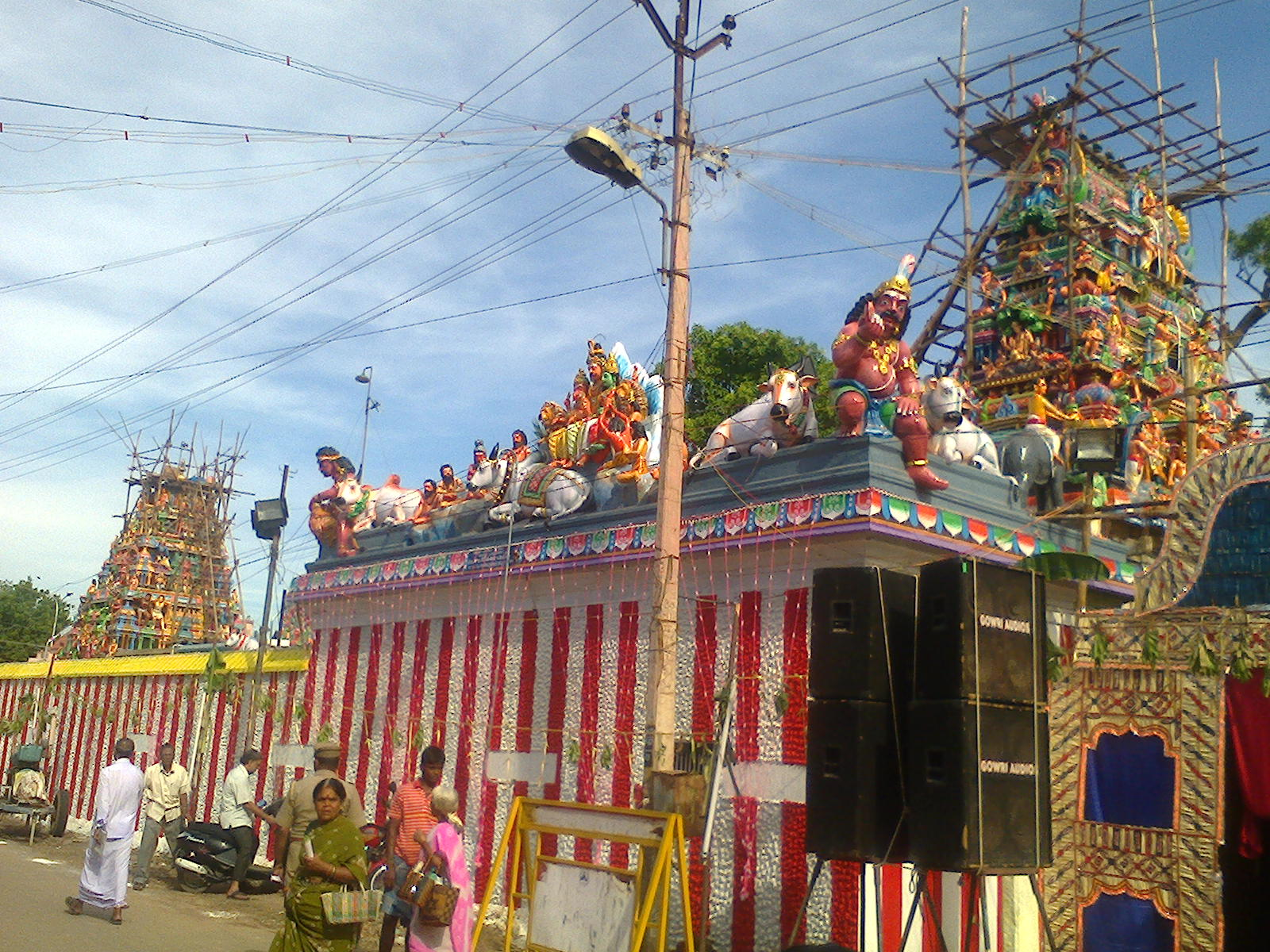

Vinayaka/Muruga Temples

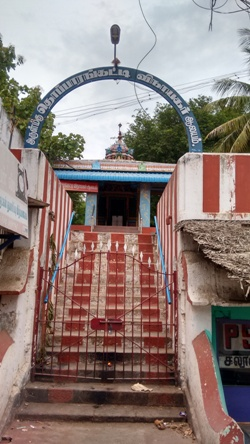
Thopparankatti Pillayar Temple

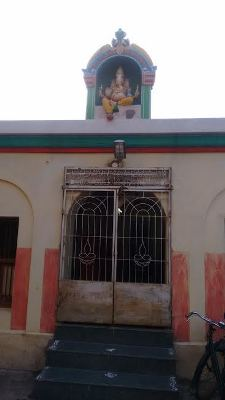
Archakasalai Pillayar Temple

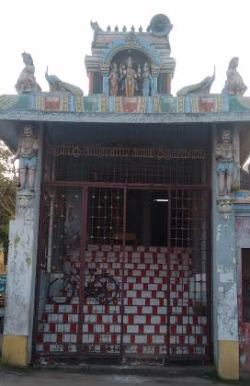
Melavasal Subramaniasvami Temple

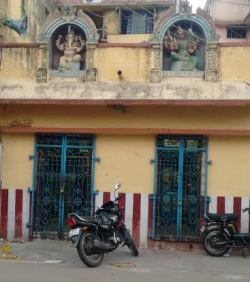
Omali Pillayar Temple (left)

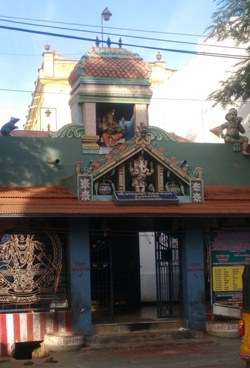
Naganatha Pillayar Temple

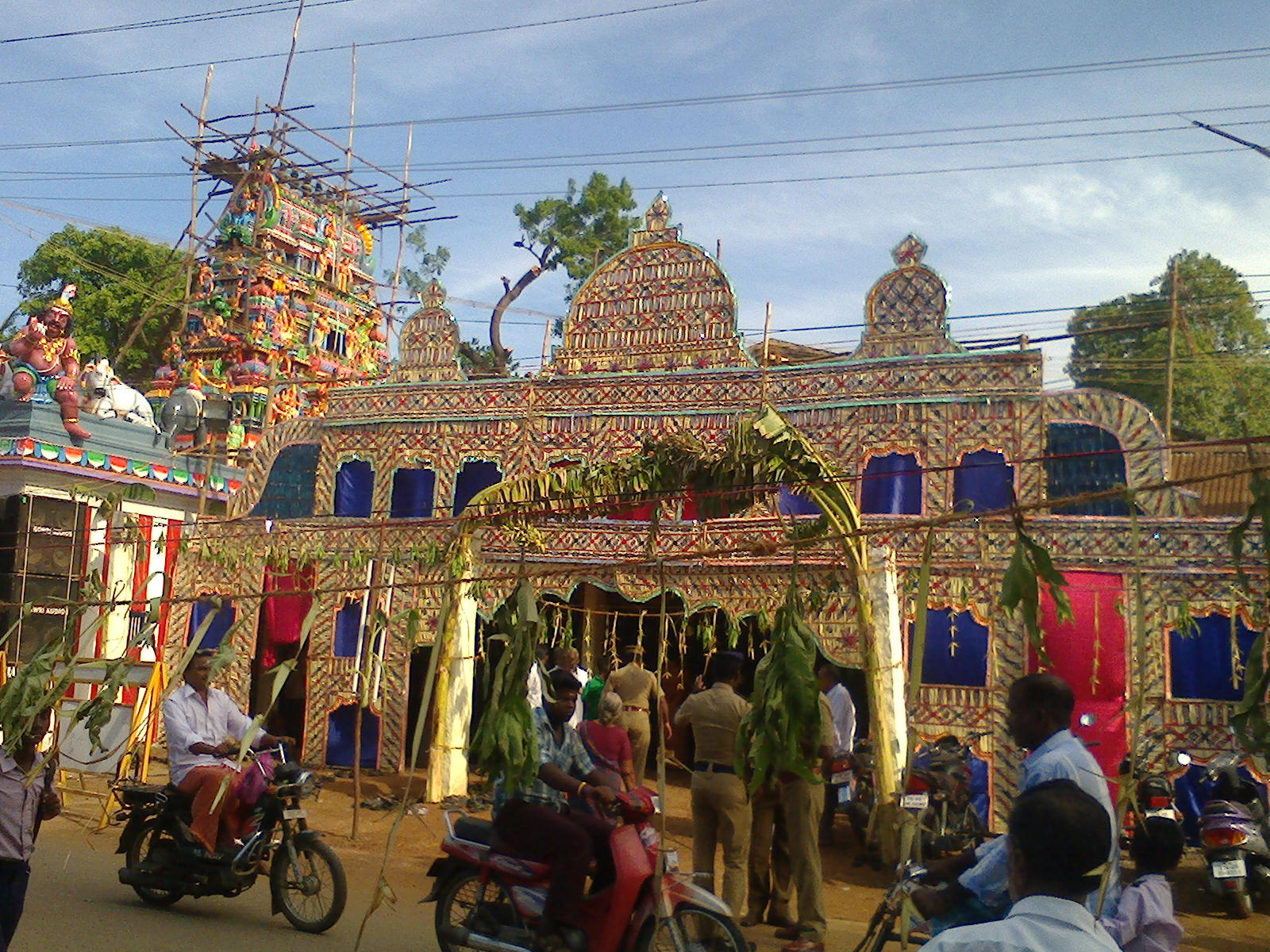
Vellai Vinayakar Temple

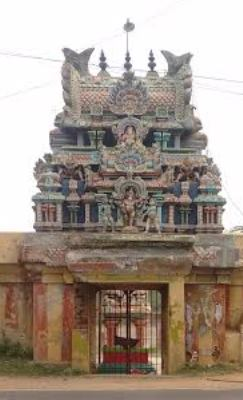
Sitthi Vinayakar Temple

=== Amman Temples ===
1. Thanjavur Fort Sri Kali Amman Temple
2. Thanjavur Fort Sri Badra Kali Temple Located near West Street, this temple is found at the rear side of Konganesvarar Temple and on the left side of Melavasal Subramaniasvami Temple and Melavasal Ranganathar Temple. The temple having Badrakaliamman as presiding deity has two entrances and prakara. The deity is facing west.
3. Thanjavur Fort Sri Utsava Kodiamman Temple]]
4. Sri Ellai Amman Temple The presiding deity Ellai Amman is also known as Renukadei. In the right Vinayaka and in the prakara shrines of Thanjan, Mathangi and Sritharangam are found followed by Nagas. There are also shrines of Chandikesvari and Gnana Bhairava. The Kumbhabhishekham was held on 10 August 2000.
5. Karanthattankudi Sri Vadabatra Kali Amman Temple or Thanjavur Nisumbasuthani Temple is located at Poomal Ravuthan Kovil Street in East Gate (10°47′48.8″N 79°08′37″E), the presiding deity Nisumbasuthani, Vada Badrakali also known as Rakukala Kaliamman is facing north. According to Thiruvalangadu copper plates during the Chola period this temple was set up. The deity is of 6' height.
She is in sitting posture, facing north, holding sula on her hand; her left leg is found on the head of asura. Her long hair is looked like fire, right ear wearing corpse, left ear with kuzhai, just hanging breasts, snake around the body etc. are found. The Mahasamprokshanam also known as Kumbhabhishekham of the temple was held after 55 years. It was held on 23 June 2016. Worshipping of the temple is from 6.00 a.m. to 12.000 noon and from 4.00 to 8.30 p.m. 6. Vennar Bank Sri Ananda Valli Amman Temple
7. Vennar Bank Sri Kodiamman Temple Located at West street next to Omali Pillayar Temple, it has a mandapa. The presiding deity is Utsava Kodiamman.
8. Sri Mariamman Temple, Punnainallur
9. Punnainallur Sri Ukkra Kali Amman Temple The presiding deity Ukkra Kali is looked like the Kalapidari of Early Chola period. This temple is located at Kuyavar street in East Gate. The temple has front mandapa and vimana. On either side of the sanctum, dwaralapalakis are found. In the left side of the mandapa Mayasakthi, Vinayaka, Muruga, Vishnu Durga, Sanisvaran and Raghu are found. Karuppannasamy, Madurai Veeran, bali peetam are also found.

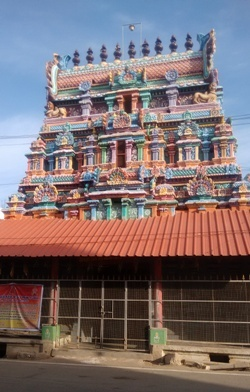
Kaliamman Temple

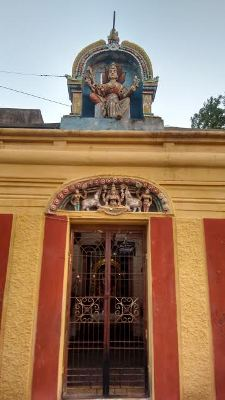
Badrakaliamman Temple

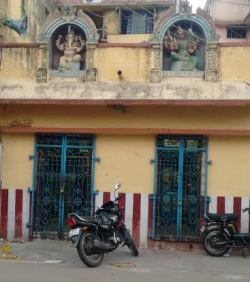
Utsava Kodiamman Temple (right)

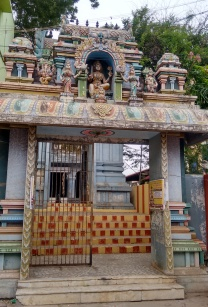
Ellai Amman Temple

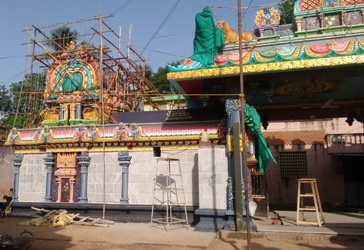
Vadabatra Kali Amman (Nisumbasuthani) Temple

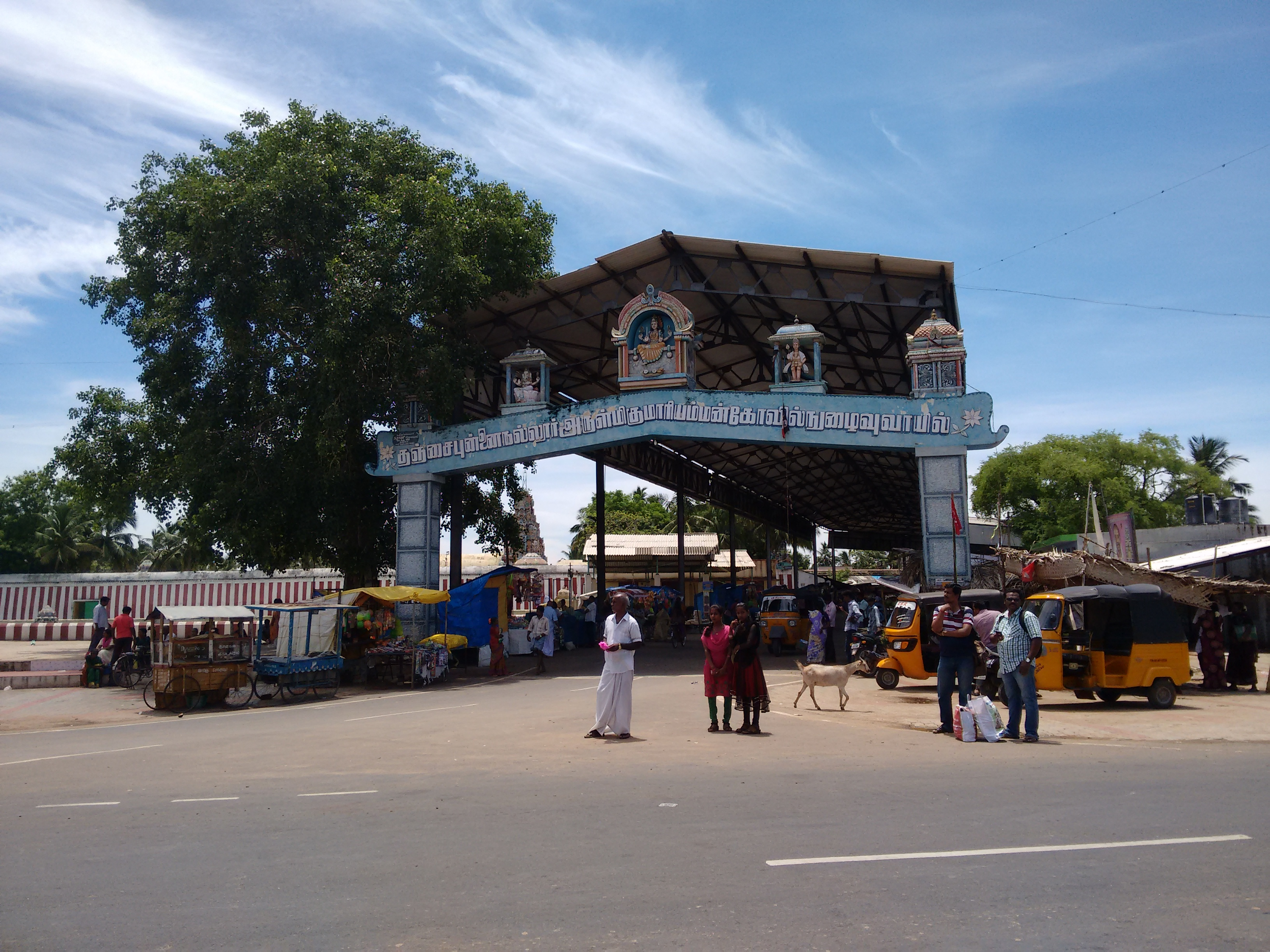
Punnainallur Mariamman Temple

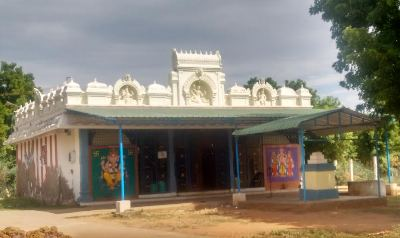
Ukkra Kali Amman Temple

Kumbhabhishekham of Vadabatra Kali Amman Temple on 23 June 2016

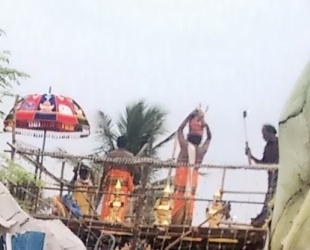

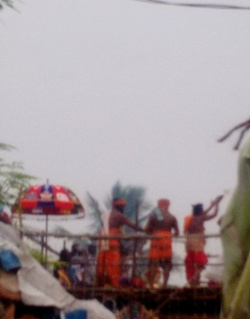

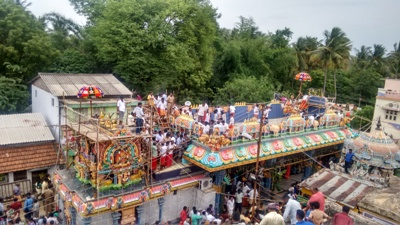

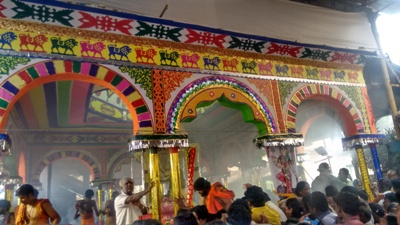

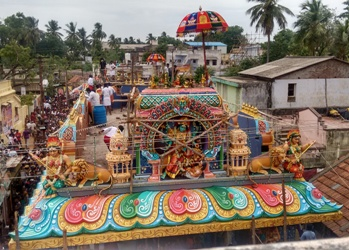

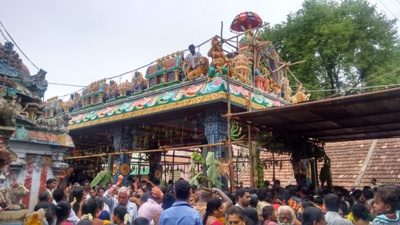

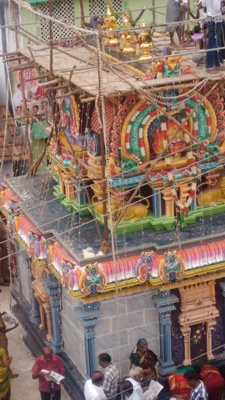

=== Hanuman Temples ===
1. Thanjavur Fort Sri Chetty Street Hanumar Temple
2. Thanjavur Fort Sri Prathapa Veera Hanumar Temple
3. Thanjavur Fort Sri Lakshatope Hanumar Temple
4. Thanjavur Fort Sri Theertha Sanjivi Temple
5. Thanjavur Fort Sri Veera Hanumar Temple
6. Thanjavur Fort Sri Gurukula Sanjivi Temple
7. Thanjavur Fort Sri Poorva Sanjivi Temple
8. Thanjavur Fort Sri Dakshihna Sanjivi Temple
9. Thanjavur Fort Sri Vettai Marga Sanjivi Temple
