= Karanthattankudi =

Township in Tamil Nadu

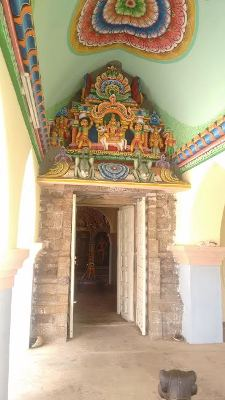
Vasistesvarar temple

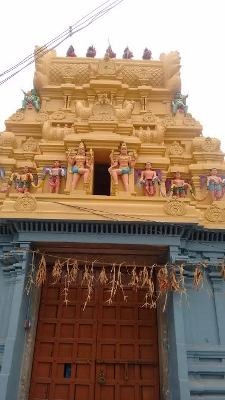
Jain temple

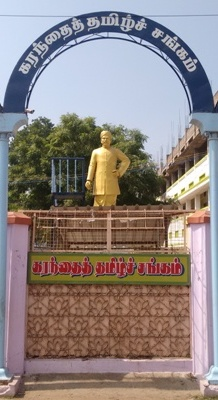
Tamil Sangam

Karunthattankudi, also known as Karunthittaikkudi and Karanthai, is a small town near Thanjavur in Tamil Nadu, India.

== Karanthattankudi Sapthas Stana Temples ==
Karanthattankudi Saptha Stana Temples comprises the temples found in Karanthattankudi, Vennattrankarai,Thittai, Kudalur, Thanjavur, Kadakadappai, Punnainallur and Poomalai. The palanquin which starts from Karanthattankudi temple would go around these temples and return to this temple. Now this festival is not held.

== Jain Temple ==
A famous Jain temple is found in this place. Jains are living here. The presiding deity of Adisvaraswamy Jain Temple, Thanjavur is 600 years old. In the Chola Nadu Jain temples are found in Thanjavur, Mannargudi, Deepankudi and Kumbakonam.

== Education ==
The Presiding deity of this place established the Karanthai Tamil Sangam. The library of the college has thousands of books.
