= Thanjavur Muthu Pallakku Festival =

Religious festival in Tamil Nadu

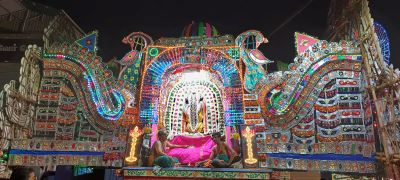
Muthu Pallakku (Pearl Palanquin)

Thanjavur Muthu Pallakku Festival is a festival celebrated every year in Thanjavur, Tamil Nadu, India. The festival is celebrated in commemoration of the Gurupuja of Gnanasambandar, in the Tamil month of Vaikasi.

During this festival Muruga and Vinayaka will come in the Muthu Pallakku also known as Pearl Palanquin. They would go around the four main streets of Thanjavur such as East Street, North Street, West Street and South Street, to the accompaniment of melas and nadasvarams. The palanquins which start the journey the previous day night would continue their journey till the morning of next day.

The palanquins, anointed on chariots from many temples in Thanjavur including Vellai Vinayakar Temple of East Gate, Muruga Temple of West Rampart, Muruga Temple of Chinna Arisikkara Street, Jothivinayaka Temple of Manambuchavadi Vijayamandapa Street, Kamalaratna Vinayaka Temple of South Street, Muruga Temple of Kurichi Street and Muruga Temple of Attumanthai Anjalkara Street having the processional deities of Muruga and Vinayaka would go around the main streets of Thanjavur. In some palanquins Gnanasambandar is also found. They would be decorated with electric lights and colour papers very aesthetically. During this year only comparatively fewer devotees participated in the festival.

== Gallery ==
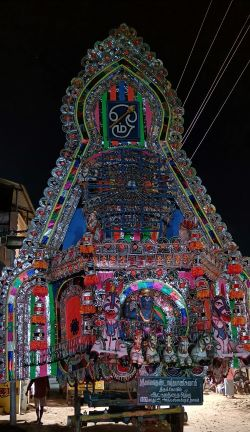

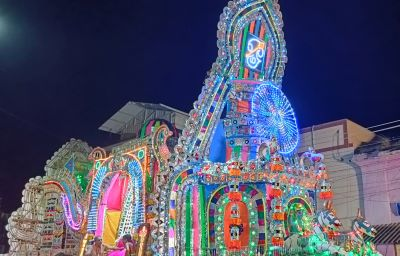

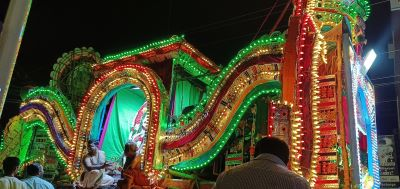

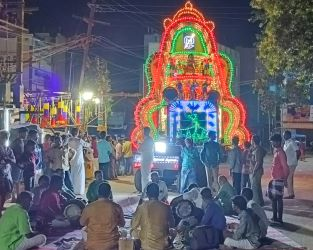
