= Kaliamman Temple, Thanjavur =

Hindu temple in Tamil Nadu

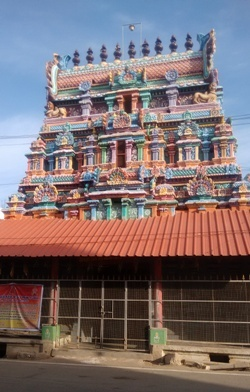
Gopura

The Kaliamman Temple, also known as the Kalikaparamesvari Temple, is a Hindu temple dedicated to Kali in Thanjavur in the Thanjavur district of Tamil Nadu, India.

== Location ==
This temple is located at South street in Thanjavur.

== Structure ==
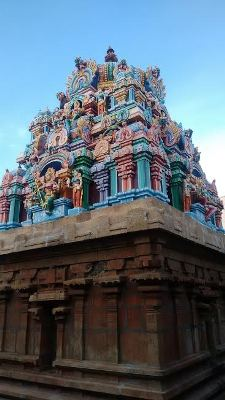
Vimana

The temple has a rajagopura. To the right side of the front mandapa, the Archakasalai Pillayar Temple is found as a shrine, and to its left side a shrine of Karthikeya. Just in front of the sanctum sanctorum is a Dhwaja Stambha and in the prakara a Tulsi (Holy Basil), as well as shrines of Vinayaka, Subramania with Valli and Deivanai, Sivalinga, Nagas and Hanuman.

== Palace Devasthanam ==
Thanjavur Palace Devasthanam comprises 88 temples, of which this temple is one. They are maintained and administered by the Hindu Religious and Charitable Endowments Department of the Government of Tamil Nadu.

== Kumbhabhishekham ==
The Mahasamprokshanam, also known as the Kumbhabhishekham, of the temple was held on 15 September 1978 and 29 August 1988. The inscriptions about these are found in the temple.
