= Yadhava Kannan Temple, Thanjavur =

Temple in Thanjavur, India

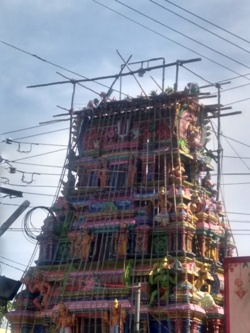
Raja gopura

Yaadava Kannan Temple, Thanjavur, is a Vishnu temple in (also known as Karanthai), a suburb of Thanjavur in Thanjavur district in Tamil Nadu (India).

== Structure ==
The temple was built during the period of Pratap Singh during 1755 (270 years ago), The temple has raja gopura, garbhagriha, inner prakara, vimana and front mandapa. .

== Presiding deity ==
The Presiding deity Shri Venugopalasamy is found with Bama and Rukmini. The processional deity, Yaadava Kannan, is in dancing posture. In the inner prakara, Tirupati Balaji is found in standing posture.

== Festivals ==
Shri Krishna Jayanti and Navaneeta Sevai ( offering of Milk cream known as Navaneeta in Samskrta language to God Krishna ) are important festivals of the temple. Shri Krishna Jayanti is celebrated 11 days. During the Navaneeta Sevai, the processional deity of this temple would go around the town along with other deities of God Vishnu temples and bless the people.

== Kumbhabhishekham ==
The Kumbhabhishekham of the temple was held on 2 July 2018.

== Other temples ==
Bhooloka Shri Krishnan Temple and Vitthoba Temple are other Kannan temples found in Thanjavur.

== Photogallery ==
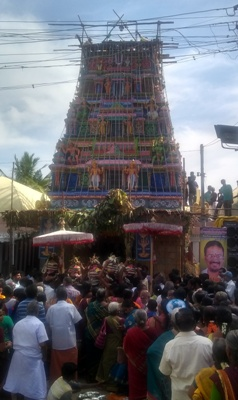

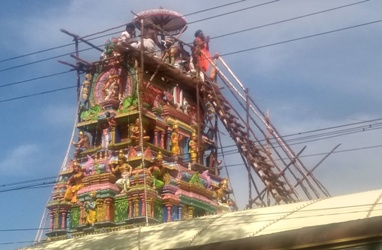

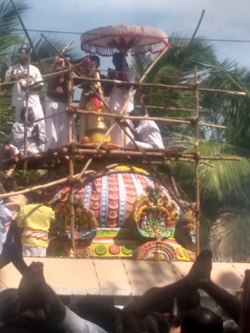

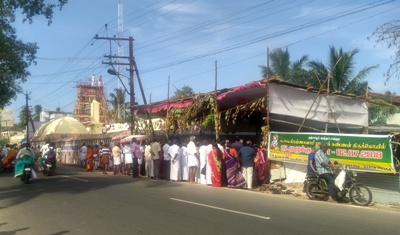

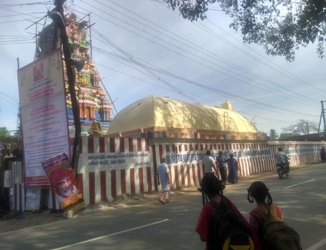

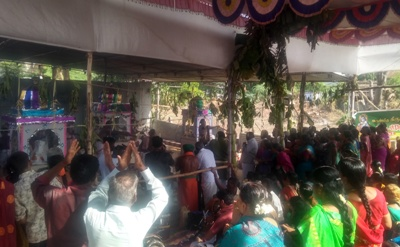
