= Vamsottharakar Temple, Perungalur =

Shiva temple in Tamil Nadu, India

Vamsottharakar Temple is a Hindu temple to the deity Shiva at Perungalur in Pudukkottai taluk of Pudukkottai district in Tamil Nadu, India.

== Structure ==
In the west is the temple tank. In between the tank and the temple is a vanni tree. In the prakara are shrines of Vinayaka, Subramania, Chandikesvarar, Dakshinamurthy, Durga and Bhairava.

== Presiding deity ==
The people of Perungalur worship the deity along with other two deities. After the fulfilment of their vows, for expressing their gratitude, they worship in the order of Urumanathar Temple, Malaiyamarungar Temple and lastly Vamsottharakar Temple. The presiding deity of this temple is known as Vamsottharakar and its goddess is known as Mangalanayaki. according to legend Kulothunga Chola III was without children. In order to beget children, he prayed to Shiva and was advised to set up two Lingas one facing east and another one facing west. He set up the Linga, facing west, in Perungalur and another Linga facing east in the west Cholalingapuram. He prayed Shiva in between these lingas and got two sons by the grace of the deity. So, the deity is known as Vamsottharakar and Kulotthunganagar.
