= Urumanathar Temple, Perungalur =

Hindu temple in Tamil Nadu, India

Urumanathar Temple is a Hindu temple dedicated to the deity Urumanatha swamy, located at Perungalur in Pudukkottai taluk of Pudukkottai district in Tamil Nadu, India.

== Location ==
This temple is located at a distance of 18 km from Pudukkottai in Pudukkottai-Thanjavur road.

== Presiding deity ==
The presiding deity is known as Urumanathar and the goddess is known as Urumanachiamman. One time Pujas are held. The temple is opened for worship from 6.00 to 12.00 noon and 4.30 to 8.00 p.m. Chittirai festival is held in a grand manner in this temple.

== Speciality ==
This is a village temple. The people of Perungalur worship the deity along with other deities. After the fulfilment of their vows, for expressing their gratitude, they worship in the order of Urumanathar Temple, Malaiyamarungar Temple and lastly Vamsottharakar Temple.

== Kumbhabhishekham ==
The Kumbhabhishekham of the temple was held during February 2018. People belonging to 18 villages in and around Perungalur participated in the function. Earlier the holy water was brought atop an elephant. They were poured on the temple kalasam in the auspicious time. Special pujas were also held.
