= Punnainallur =

Punnai Nallur
- village
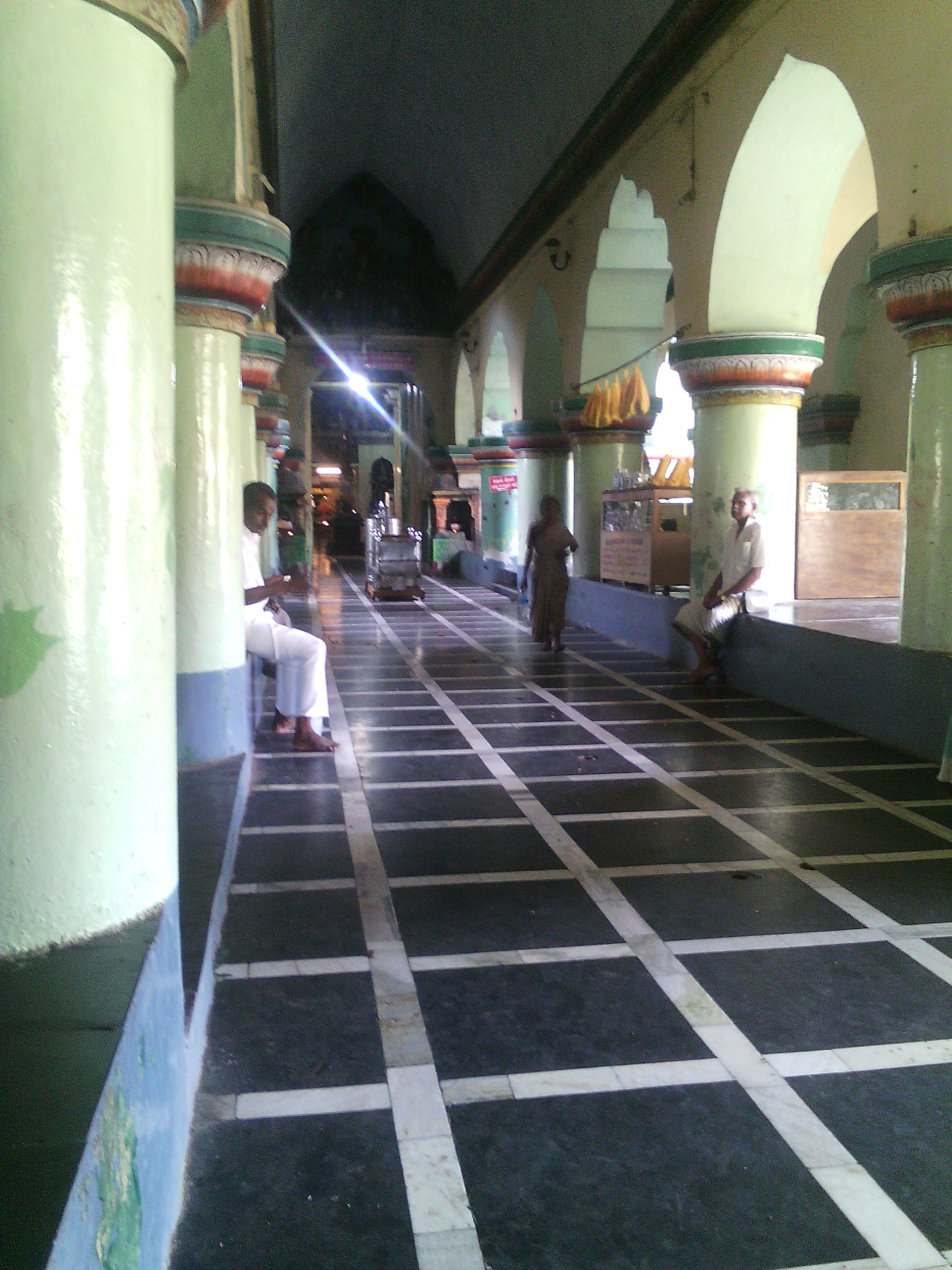
- Punnainallur Mariamman temple

- Location in Tamil Nadu, India
- Coordinates: 10.785°N 79.190°E
- Country: India
- State: Tamil Nadu
- District: Thanjavur
- Taluk: Thanjavur

Population (2001)
  - Total: 5,442

Languages
  - Official: Tamil
- Time zone: UTC+5:30 (IST)

Punnai Nallur is a village in the Thanjavur taluk of Thanjavur district, Tamil Nadu, India. The temple of goddess Punnainallur Mariamman is located in the outskirts of Thanjavur in the Thanjavur District.

== Demographics ==
As per the 2001 census, Pinnai Nallur had a total population of 5442 with 2700 males and 2742 females. The sex ratio was 1016. The literacy rate was 80.98.

== Landmark ==
- Punnainallur Mariamman Temple is located 5 km from Thanjavur Old Bus stand.
- Punnainallur Kothandaramar Temple
- Punnainallur Kailasanathar Temple
