= Punnainallur Kothandaramar Temple =

Hindu temple in Tamil Nadu, India

Coordinates: 10°47′11″N 79°11′15″E

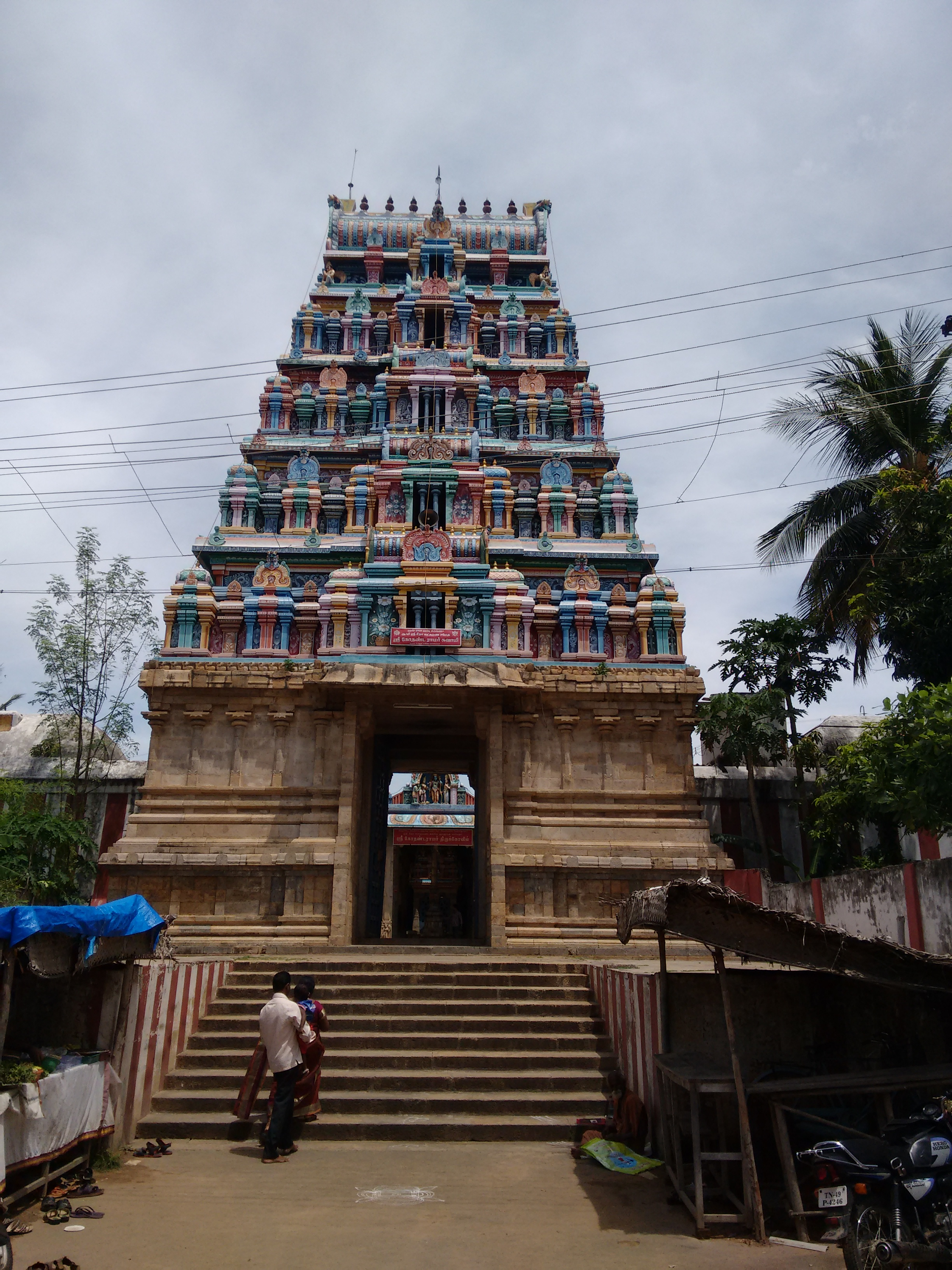
- Entrance of the temple

Religion
- Affiliation: Hinduism

Location
- State: Tamil Nadu
- Country: India
- Interactive map of Punnainallur Kothandaramar Temple

The Punnainallur Kothandaramar Temple is a Hindu temple located at Punnainallur near Thanjavur in the state of Tamil Nadu, India.

== Palace Devasthanam ==
Thanjavur Palace Devasthanam comprises 88 temples, of which this temple is one. They are maintained and administered by the Hindu Religious and Charitable Endowments Department of the Government of Tamil Nadu.

== History ==
This temple was built in 1739–1763 CE. Sculptures made of Shaligram, given by a Nepalese king to the king of Thanjavur, are found in the sanctum sanctorum; these include Kothandaramar, Sita and Lakshmana, all of them in standing posture. This temple is very near to Punnainallur Mariamman Temple.

== Structure ==
This temple has rajagopura, balipeetam, Dhwaja Stambha, prakara, front mandapa, sanctum sanctorum and vimana. In the prakara there are shrines of Sakkarattalvar, Alvar and Anjaneya. The temple tree is also located here. On the wall are paintings of episodes from the Ramayana.

== Gallery ==
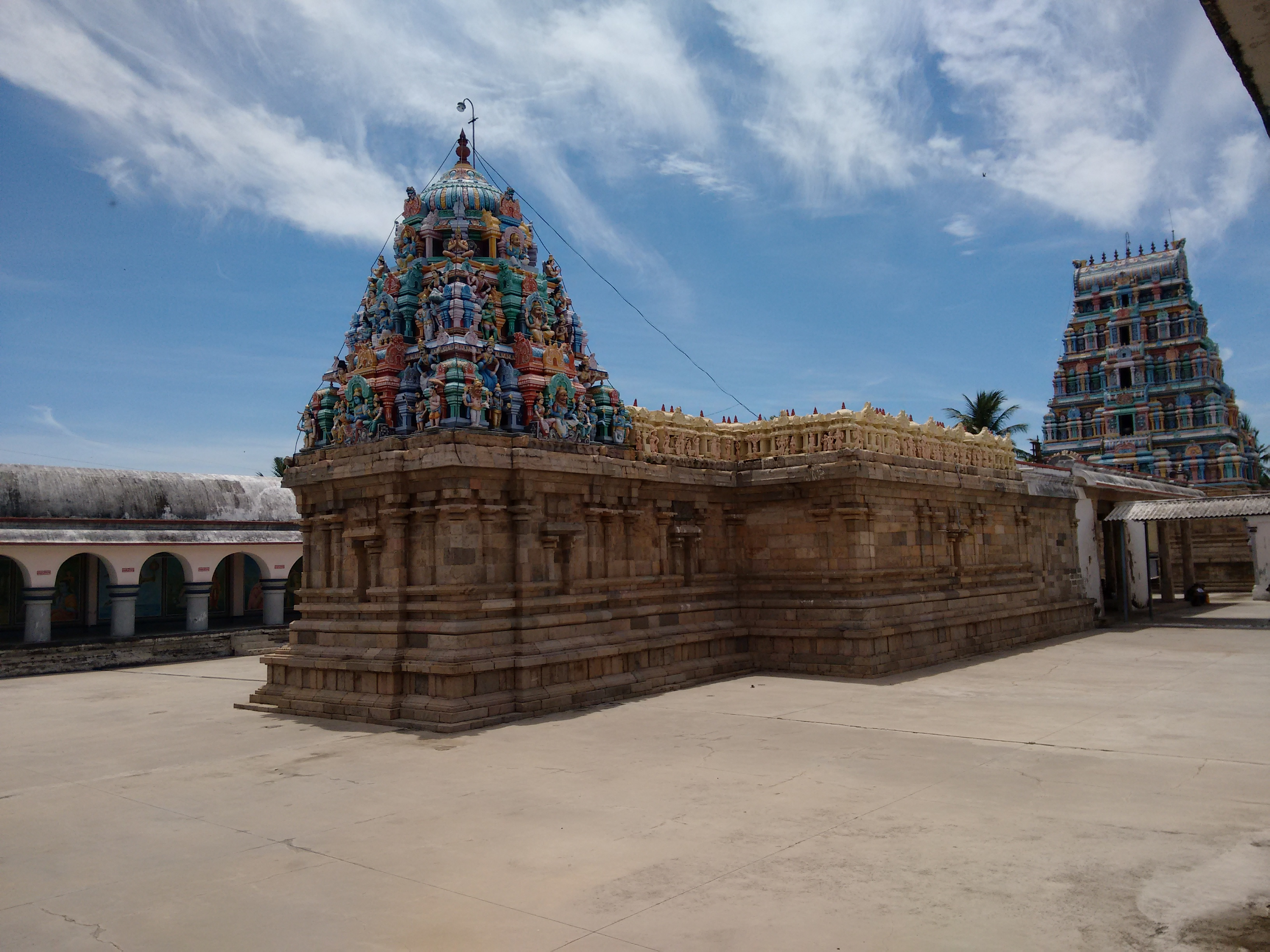

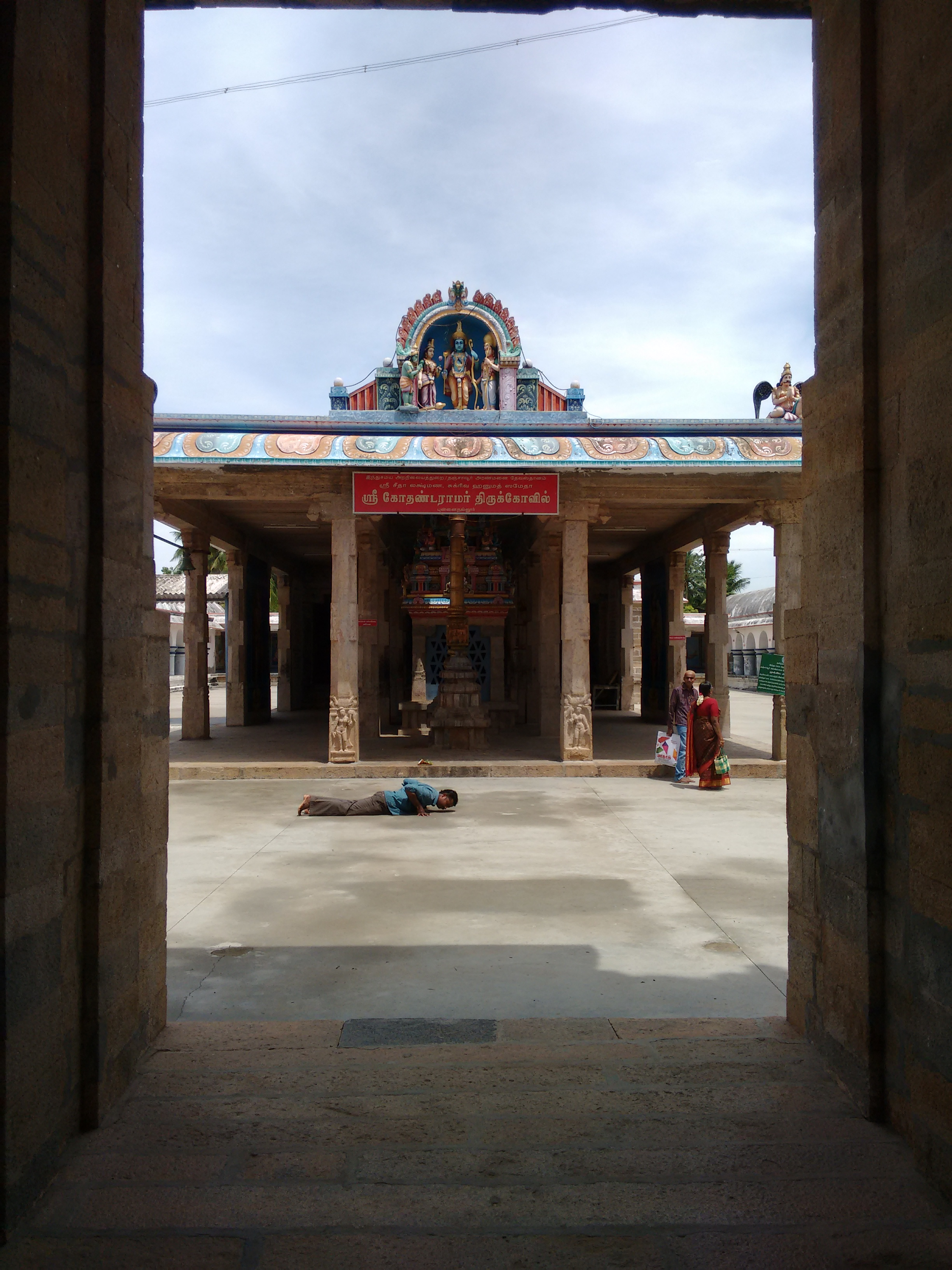

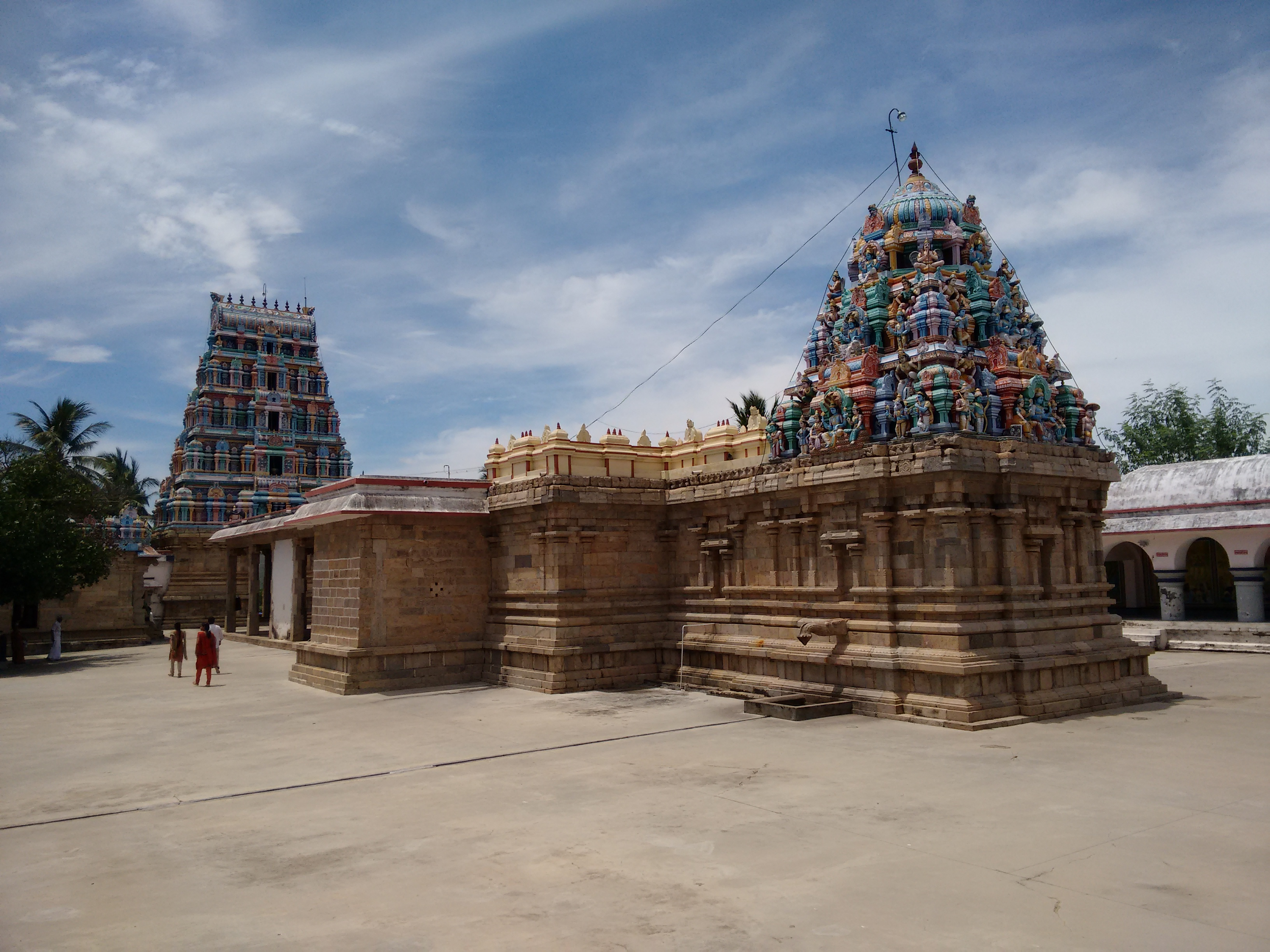
