= Manambuchavadi Venkatasubbayyar =

Akumadugula Manambuchavadi Venkatasubbaiyya (1803–1862) was a Carnatic music vocalist and composer. He composed the varnam Jalajakshi, in raga Hamsadhwani. He was the cousin and a direct student of the famous composer Tyagaraja. He was also an accomplished singer and a renowned teacher. He was a scholar in Telugu and Sanskrit. He composed in Telugu Language.

Venkatasubbaiyya was born in the village of Manambuchavadi in the Thanjavur district, Tamil Nadu. He spent most of his life in the company of the great Tyagarja and helped preserving many of his compositions.

Five of Venkatasubbaiyya's students, Maha Vaidyanatha Iyer, Patnam Subramania Iyer, Sarabha Sastri, Tyagaraja (the grandson of the great composer Tyagaraja) and Fiddle Venkoba Rao later went on to become famous composers/musicians of merit. Furthermore, he also taught Susarla Dakshinamurty Sastri who took Tyagaraja's compositions to Andhra. Venkatasubbaiyya's compositions had the mudra Venkatesa.

== See also ==
- List of Carnatic composers
