= Thanjavur Sankaranarayanar Temple =

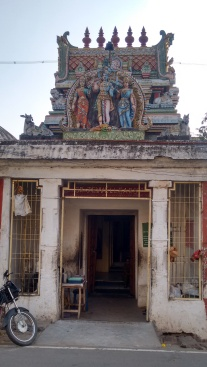
Temple entrance

Thanjavur Sankaranarayanar Temple is a Hindu temple located at Thanjavur in the Thanjavur taluk of Thanjavur district in Tamil Nadu, India. The temple is dedicated to Shiva.

The presiding deity of the temple is known as Sankaranayanar, and a sculpture of the deity is found in the temple. The right part of the sculpture represents Shiva, and the left part represents Vishnu. The Consort of the presiding deity, Balambikai, is found in a separate shrine. The history of the temple is found in Brahadisvara Mahatmiyam and Thanjapuri Mahatmiyam.

== Palace Devasthanam ==
Thanjavur Palace Devasthanam comprises 88 temples, of which this temple is the one. They are maintained and administered by the Hindu Religious and Charitable Endowments Department of the Government of Tamil Nadu.
