= Malaiyamarungar Temple, Perungalur =

Hindu temple in Tamil Nadu, India

Malaiyamarungar Temple is a Hindu temple dedicated to the deity Aiyanar, located at Perungalur in Pudukkottai taluk of Pudukkottai district in Tamil Nadu, India.

== Location ==
This temple is located at a distance of 18 km from Pudukkottai in Pudukkottai-Thanjavur road.

== Presiding deity ==
The presiding deity is known as Malayamarungar. He is found with his consorts Purna and Pushkala.

== Speciality ==
As the deity, once gave vision to a devotee, their inheritors are working in the temple and doing service. The devotees pray to the deity to fulfil their vows. On their fulfilment, they offer elephants made of clay to Malaiyamarungar. The people of Perungalur worship the deity along with other two deities. After the fulfilment of their vows, for expressing their gratitude, they worship in the order of Urumanathar Temple, Malaiyamarungar Temple and lastly Vamsottharakar Temple.

== Worshipping time ==
One time Pujas are held. The temple is opened for worship from 6.00 to 12.00 noon and 4.30 to 8.00 p.m. Chittirai festival is held in a grand manner in this temple.
