= Karanthai Tamil Sangam =

Tamil language society in Tamil Nadu, India, founded in 1911 to promote the language

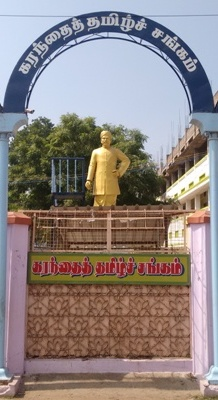
Entrance

Karanthai Tamil Sangam is a Tamil language society in Tamil Nadu, India. The society was founded in 1911 to promote the language. It is one of the modern Tamil Sangams.

== History ==
Karanthai Tamil Sangam was founded on 14 May 1911 in Karanthattankudi (also known as Karunthattaikudi and Karanthai), a suburb of Thanjavur, Tamil Nadu. The society was founded by Radhakrishna Pillai with his brother Umamaheswara Pillai as its first president. The Sangam passed a resolution in 1920 to declare Tamil as classical language. In a meeting on 27 August 1937, it condemned the imposition of Hindi in the educational institutions.

== Activities ==
The society started a literacy journal Tamil polil in 1925. It conducts monthly meetings and seminars on Tamil literature. It established educational institutions to provide Tamil education.

== See also ==
- Madurai Tamil Sangam
