= Punnainallur Mariamman Temple =

Hindu temple in Tamil Nadu, India

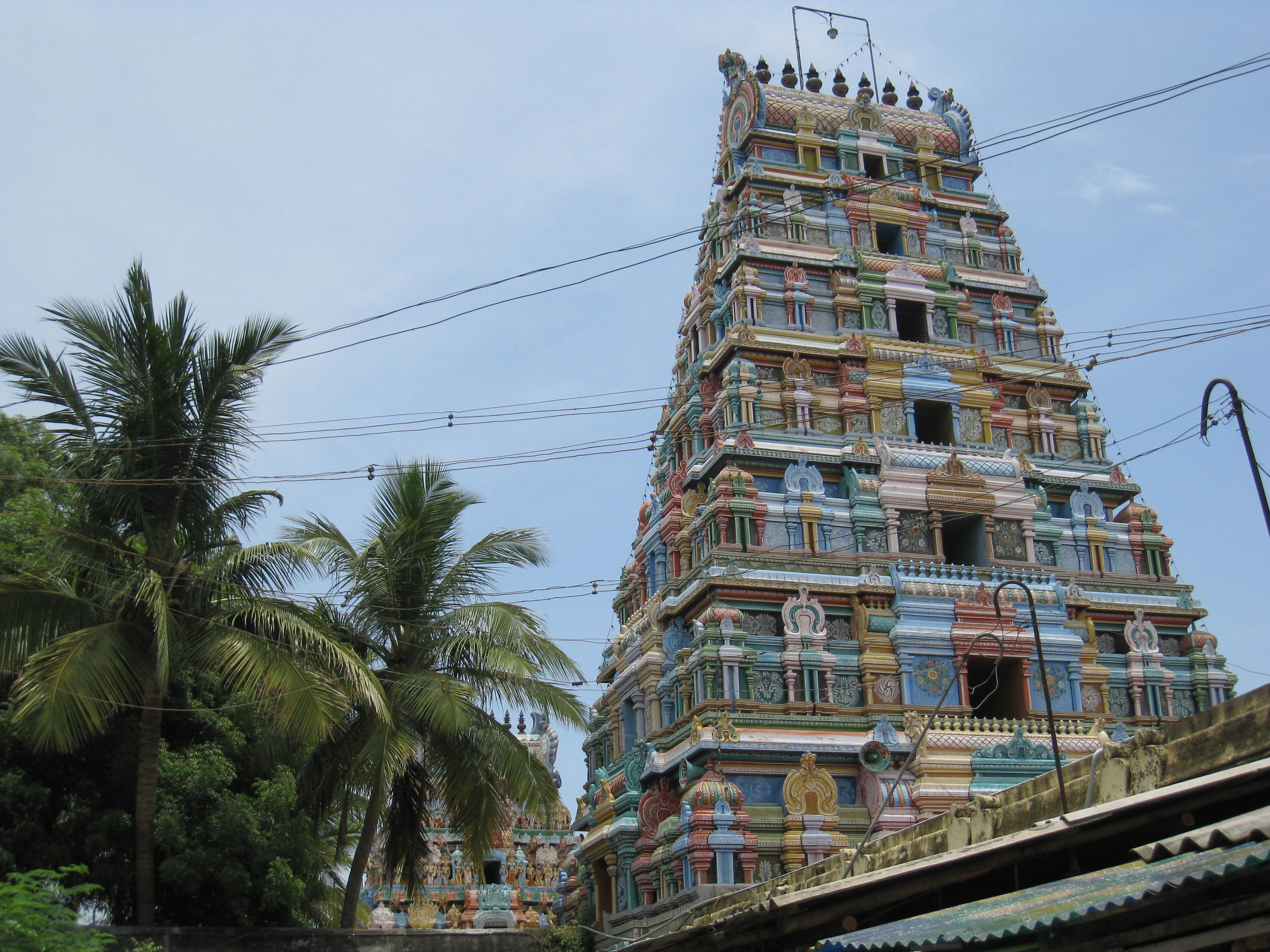
- Punnainallur Mariamman Temple

- Location in Tamil Nadu, India Punnainallur Mariamman Temple (India)

Religion
- Affiliation: Hinduism
- District: Thanjavur District
- Deity: Mariamman

Location
- Location: Punnainallur
- State: Tamil Nadu
- Country: India
- Interactive map of Punnainallur Mariamman Temple
- Coordinates: 10°47′07″N 79°11′22″E

The Punnai Nallur Mariamman Temple, temple of goddess Mariamman, is a Hindu temple located at Punnainallur near Thanjavur in the state of Tamil Nadu, India. Situated on the outskirts of Thanjavur, Punnainallur popularly known as Thanjavur Mariamman Kovil has derived considerable importance from time immemorial in both legend and history. The temple attracts thousands of devotees from all parts of the district throughout the year. Thanks to the munificence of its devotees, the temple has been given a facelift in the recent past.

== Legend ==
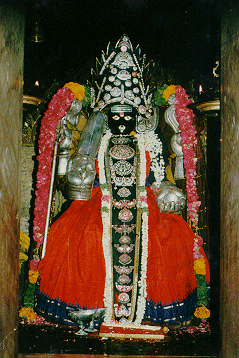
Punnainallur Mariamman, the main deity at the temple

The temple, facing east, has three prakarams. It occupies an area of about one acre, It has a 90 feet high Rajagopuram, which is comparatively of recent origin. There are several mandapams here viz., the Arthamandapam, Mahamandapam, Narthanamandapam, Dwajamandapam, Alankaramandapam and the Thirumalaipathimandapam. There are in the temple paintings of the different forms of Ashta Sakthi viz., Gajalakshmi, Veera Lakshmi, Sowbhagya Lakshmi, Santhana Lakshmi, Dhana Lakshmi, Dhanya Lakshmi, Vidhya Lakshmi and Karunya Lakshmi. The Sukravaramandapam in the Amman Sannadhi has beautifully carved pillars. The Sthala Viruksham of the temple is “Vembu” (i.e., Neem Tree) and the sacred Theertham is Mani Muktha Nadhi (Vadavar River). The presiding deity of this shrine, Goddess Mariamman, is represented by anidol made of sand over anani-hill and covered with a silver kavacham. Sundays are considered to be the most auspicious days for worshipping the Goddess, when a large number of devotees, mostly women and children pay their homage.

Poojas are performed four times daily. Once in five years anointment with Thailam (oil) is performed. Abhishegam is performed daily thrice to Durgai whose sanctum is located to the right of the presiding deity, facing north.

== History ==
Many are the stories that account for the existence of this Goddess Mariamman and the temple. It is however said that the great Sage Sadashiva Brahmendra played a major role. The Devi herself had asked Sadashiva Brahmendra to install her in the place. With his yogic powers, it is believed that Sadashiva Brahmendra created the image of Punnainallur Mariamman from a snake pit. He also enshrined a powerful yantram after which the Devi herself came into the idol and sat there to bless her devotees. After a few days/months, the story goes that a King by name Venkoji Maharaja Chatrapathi once went on a pilgrimage to the southern parts of the country. On his return journey from Rameswaram, the King had the opportunity to stay, with his retinue, at Samayapuram Mariamman Kovil near Tiruchirapalli. The King had a dream that night, when a young girl, styling herself as Mariamman, asked the King to construct a ‘‘pucca’’ temple for Her as she was in the vicinity of а forest full of **Punnai" Trees and disappeared. Next morning the King returned to his capital and made speedy arrangements for the installation of this Goddess. The deity of this temple later came to be known as Punnainallur Mariamman. The story goes that

Thuljaji Raja, Son of Venkoji Maharaja, had a daughter, with very poor eyesight. The king was very much worried over her ailment. It is said that he worshipped this Goddess Mariambal who appeared in his dream and asked him to go to PunnainaHur Mariamman Sannadhi with his daughter where she would regain her eyesight. As per the dream, King Thuljaji went to Mariamman Sannadhi with his daughter and prayed for the restoration of her eyesight. While receiving the Deepa Aratbanai she had a shock and a tendency of losing something from her eyes and immediately she was able to gain her eyesight.

Being overwhelmed by this incident, the King decided to renovate this temple. He deputed priest (gurukkal) for pooja. Usually in all Mariamman Temples, Poojaris are appointed for Pooja and other functions. The king was also fortunate enough to meet Sri Sadasiva Brahmendra Swamigal, who was passing through that village. The king immediately narrated this incident to him and requested the Swamiji to stay till Kumbabishegam. Accordingly the saint made a powerful ** yanthram °°, (pectam) to be placed under the idol of the Goddess, and celebrated the Kumbabishegam on a grand scale. Mariambalpuram now called Pandaravadai in Papanasam Taluk is a village gifted to the temple by Thuljaji Raja.

Thanjavur kings endowed enormous landed gifts for the maintenance of this temple. As the Thanjavur Maharajas and Queens have to go through hazardous routes for dharsan, an underground passage (* Surangam") was constructed from their Palace to this shrine. . The entrance of the surangam stands as a monument even now, behind the temple.

A Chola King named Keerthi Cholan, had no heir to succeed him. Being an ardent and regular devotee of this Goddess, he was gifted with a son, Theva Cholan, as an heir to the throne.

Another story is that ап European by name, Mr. Wilson had an ailing eye. Through his ardent devotion to this deity he was cured.

А saint, Sri Padahacheri Swamigal, was instrumental for the renovation of the temple and an image of the Swamigal could be seen in the Prakaram behind the sanctum sanctorum.

Devotees suffering from small-pox take vows such as « Thotti Kattuthal °° (storing water in the sanctum or in the Prakaram in a tube-like structure to signify cooling effect). Giving salt to the temple and mixing jaggery in the temple tank are some of the practices followed by the devotees. A nominal fee is collected for this purpose. Members of the public give cattle, fowl etc., as votive offerings. An elephant has been given to the temple by a devotee. A Ther (car) costing about Rs. 10,000 has been donated by another devotee.

There is a separate shrine for Pechi Amman, where flesh food is offered to the Goddess. Mariamman of Punnainallur is deeply venerated in the locality and the devotees see a divine grace in her. Many are those who consider themselves blessed. by this popular Goddess.

1800 AD in reference, The Mariamman festival is still more largely attended attracting, annually a crowd of some 20,000 Visitors. Even Brahmans do not scorn to propitiate the devils and village deities especially when they are ill. An intelligent Brahman expressed the situation by a curious analogy: ‘I attempt to win the favour of the Collector because he may promote me; but I pay black-mail to the Kallans too. Of what good is the Collector's friendship if the Kallans steal my bullocks ?

== Palace Devasthanam ==
Thanjavur Palace Devasthanam comprises 88 temples, of which this temple is the one. They are maintained and administered by the Hindu Religious and Charitable Endowments Department of the Government of Tamil Nadu.

== Location ==
This temple located in Punnai Nallur, which is popularly known as Mariamman Kovil, Thanjavur and it is 5 km from Thanjavur Old Bus stand. Punnainallur lies at a distance of about five kilometres east of Thanjavur and is easily accessible by bus. Town buses ply between Thanjavur and Punnainallur at regular intervals.

== Kumbhabhishekham ==
During the reign of Tulaja of Thanjavur (1727 CE–1735 CE) a small structure of the temple was built. Serfoji II (1798 CE–1832 CE) built mahamandapa, narthana mandapa, gopura, the second inner prakara and conducted the Kumbhabhishekham. Later Kumbhabhishekhams were held on 1950 CE and 6 June 1987.

== Gallery ==
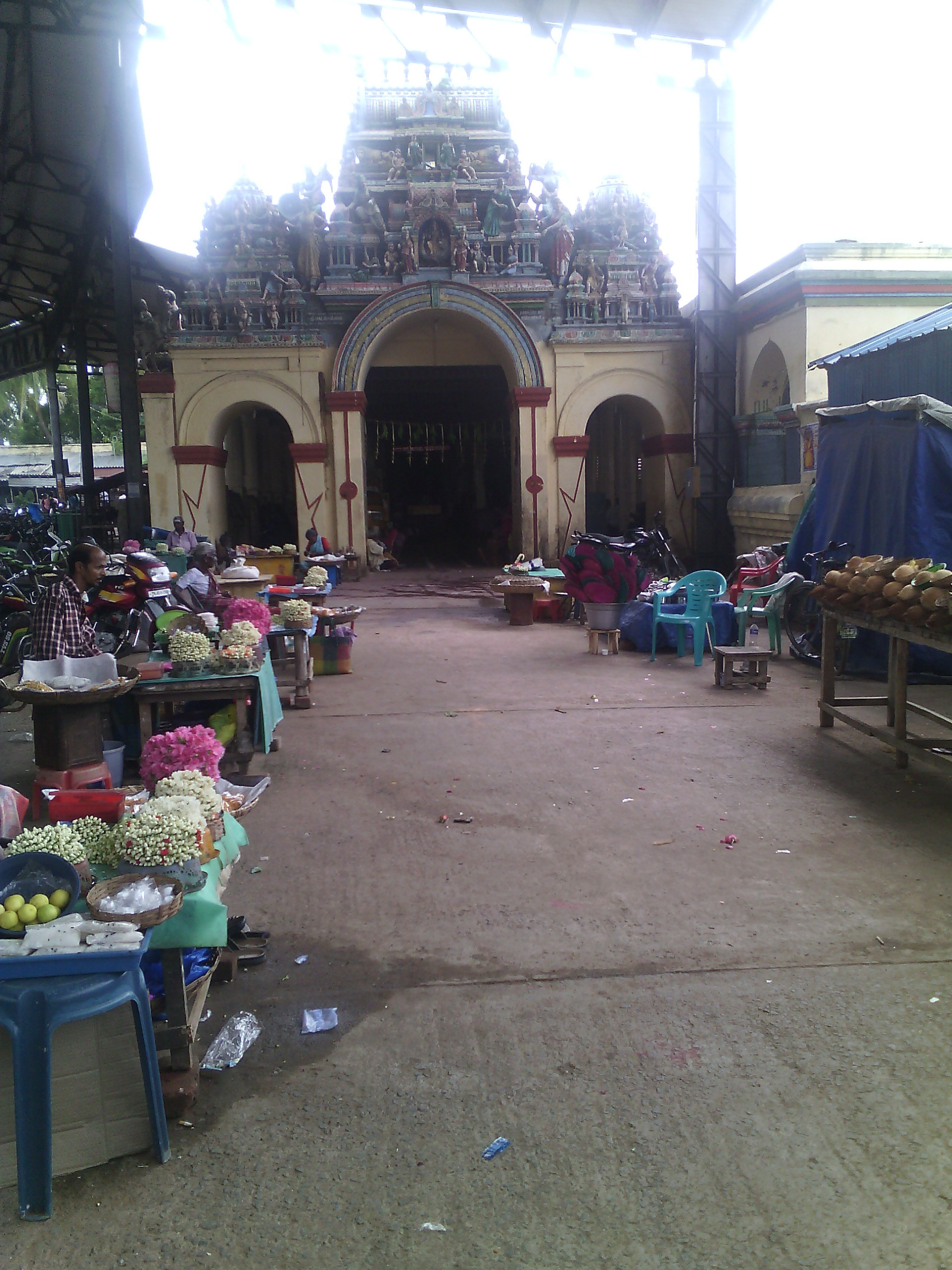
Entrance

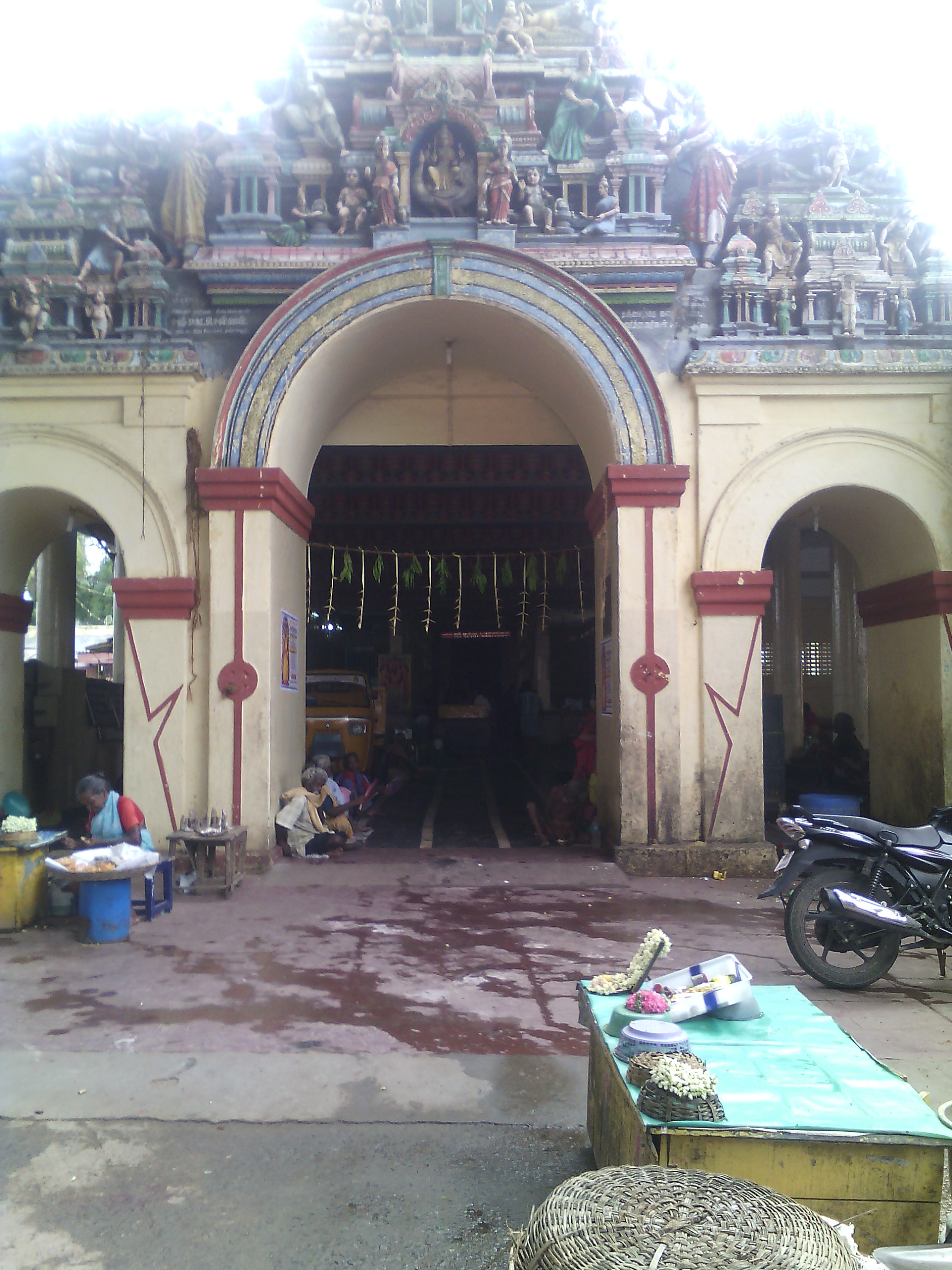
Entrance

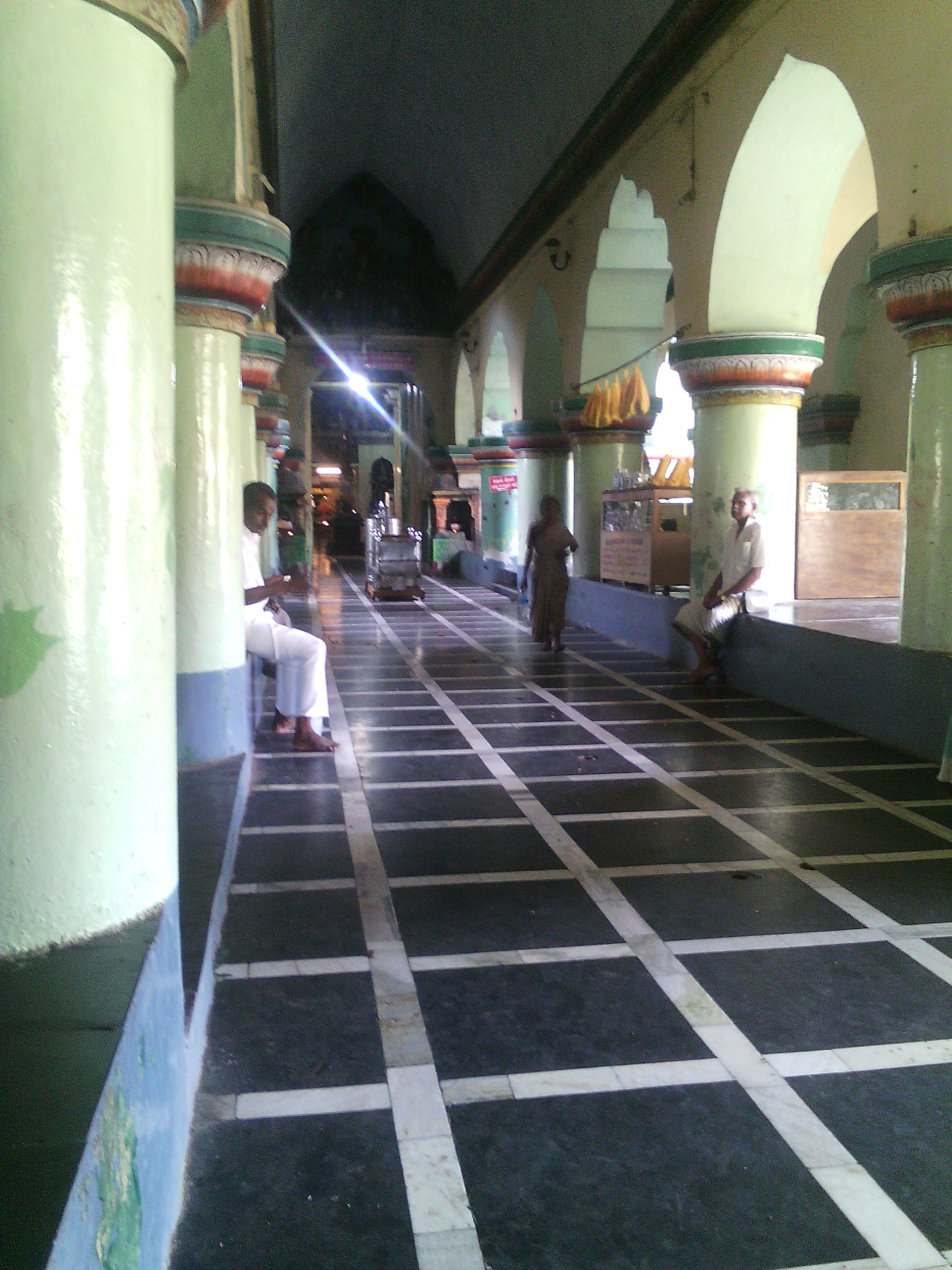
Inner mandapa

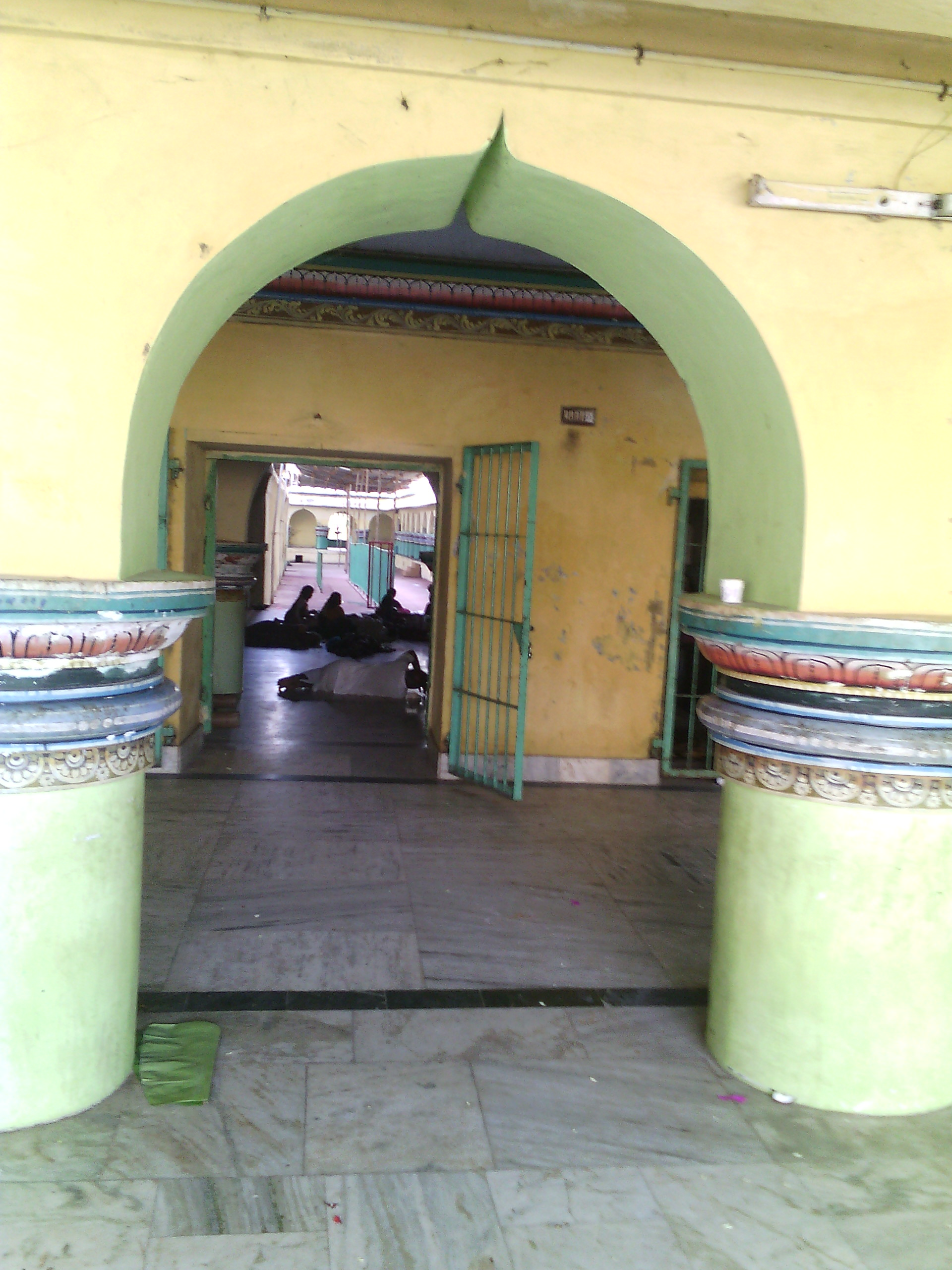
Prakara

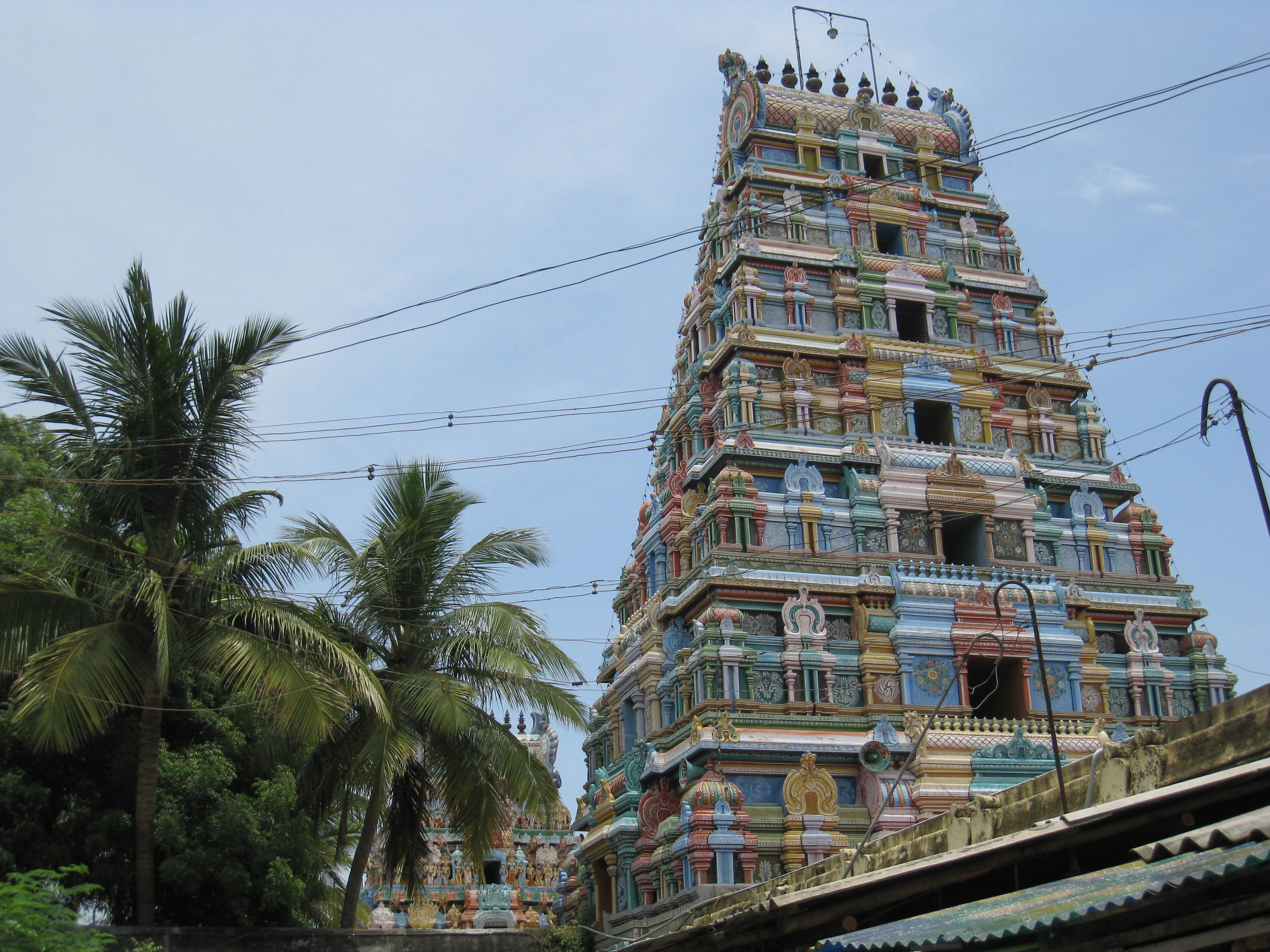
Gopuram

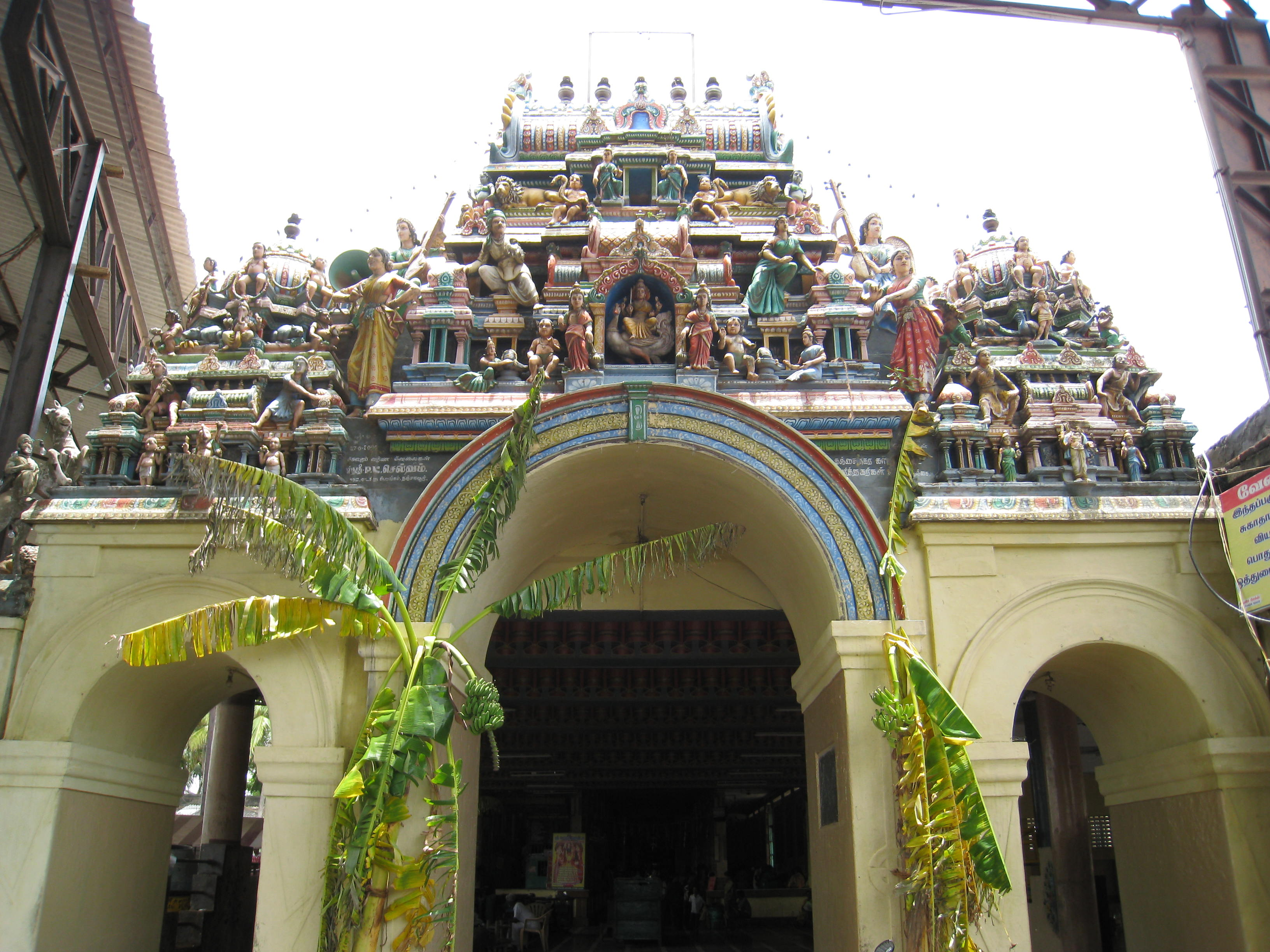
Entrance
