= Punnainallur Kailasanathar Temple =

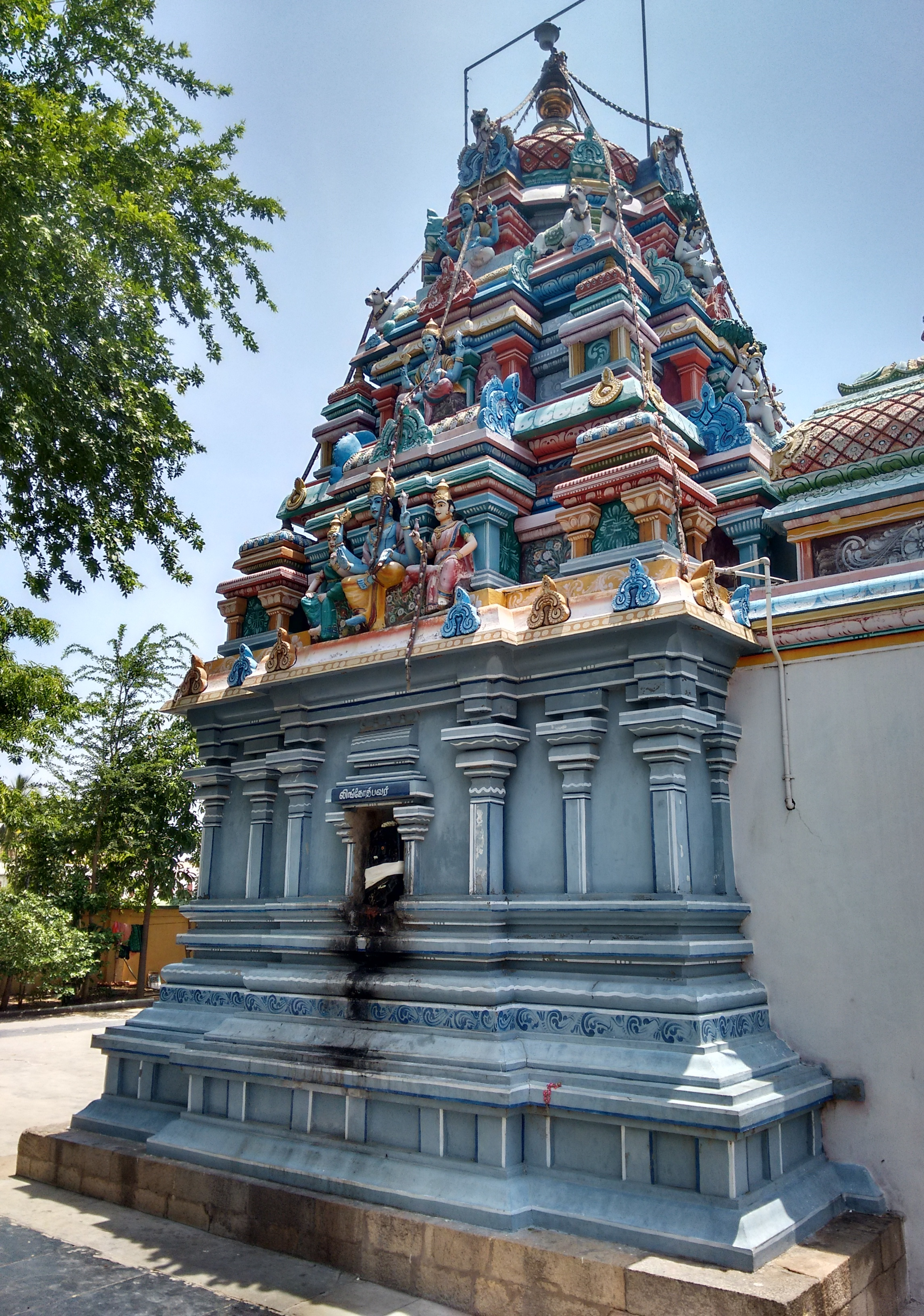
Vimana

The Punnainallur Kailasanathar Temple, is a Hindu temple dedicated to Shiva at Punnainallur near Thanjavur in the state of Tamil Nadu, India. It is one of the 88 Thanjavur Palace Devastanam Temples, which are maintained and administered by the Hindu Religious and Charitable Endowments Department of the Government of Tamil Nadu.

The temple's Nataraja idol was stolen in 1971. A volunteer-collective India Pride Project with the support of the Archaeological Survey of India traced the idol to the Asia Society Museum, New York in the United States and the idol was returned in 2021.
