= Vasishtesvarar Temple, Karunthittaikkudi =

Hindu temple in Tamil Nadu, India

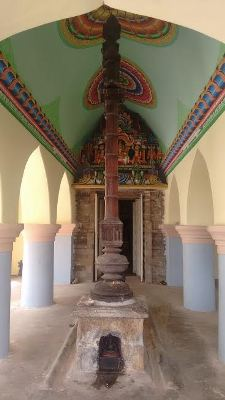
Temple entrance

Vasishtesvarar Temple is a Hindu temple at Karunthittaikkudi near Thanjavur in the Thanjavur district of Tamil Nadu, India.

It is one of the shrines of the Vaippu Sthalams mentioned by Tamil Saivite Nayanar Sundarar. The presiding deity is known as Vasishtesvarar, Karunasamy and Karuvelanathasamy. His consort is known as Periyanayaki and Tiripurasundari.

It is one of the 88 Thanjavur Palace Devasthanam. They are maintained and administered by the Hindu Religious and Charitable Endowments Department of the Government of Tamil Nadu.

== Gallery ==
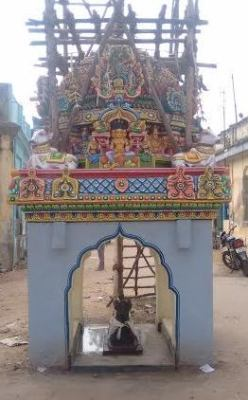
Nandhi mandapa

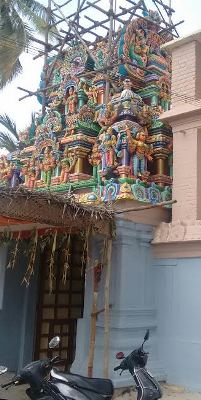
Gopura in the southern entrance

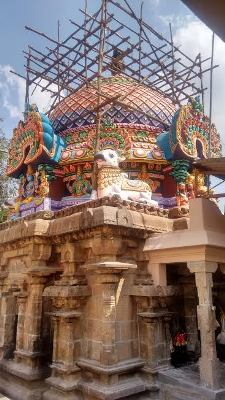
Vimana of the presiding deity

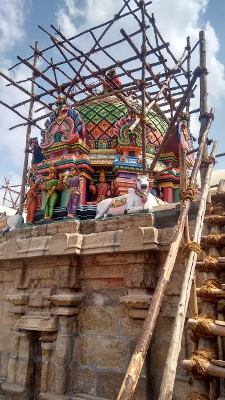
Vimana of Periyanayaki

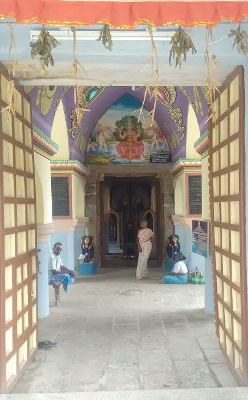
Entrance to the shrine of Periyanayaki

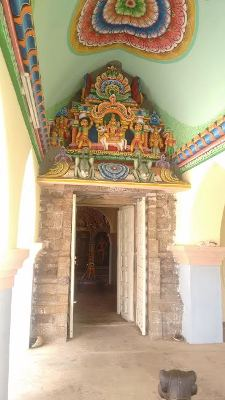
Entrance to the shrine of presiding deity

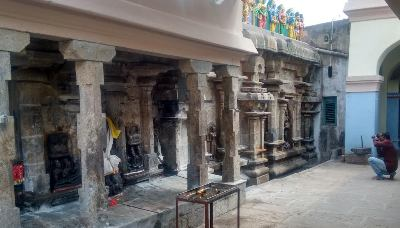
Kosta sculptures
