= Kadakadappai =

- village
- Location in Tamil Nadu, India
- Coordinates: 10.798652°N 79.18589°E
- Country: India
- State: Tamil Nadu
- District: Thanjavur

Population (2001)
  - Total: 373

Languages
  - Official: Tamil
- Time zone: UTC+5:30 (IST)

Kadakadappai is a village in Thanjavur taluk, Thanjavur district, Tamil Nadu, India.

== Demographics ==
As per the 2001 census, Kadakadappai had a total population of 373 with, 186 males and 187 females. The sex ratio was 1005, and the literacy rate was 70.25.
