= Manambuchavadi =

- town
- Country: India
- State: Tamil Nadu
- District: Thanjvaur

Languages
  - Official: Tamil
- Time zone: UTC+5:30 (IST)
- Vehicle registration: TN-
- Coastline: 0 kilometres (0 mi)

Manambuchavadi was an old suburb of Thanjavur town which formed the European quarter of the city in colonial times.

== Notable people ==
- Manambuchavadi Venkatasubbayyar (1803–1862) - Carnatic musician; disciple of Tyagaraja (1767–1847).
- Thanjai N. Ramaiah Dass (1914–1965) - Tamil poet and scriptwriter
