= Kumbhabhishekham =

Hindu temple consecration ritual

Kumbhabhishekam or Samprokshanam, is a Hindu ritual that is performed during the consecration of temples.

== Etymology ==
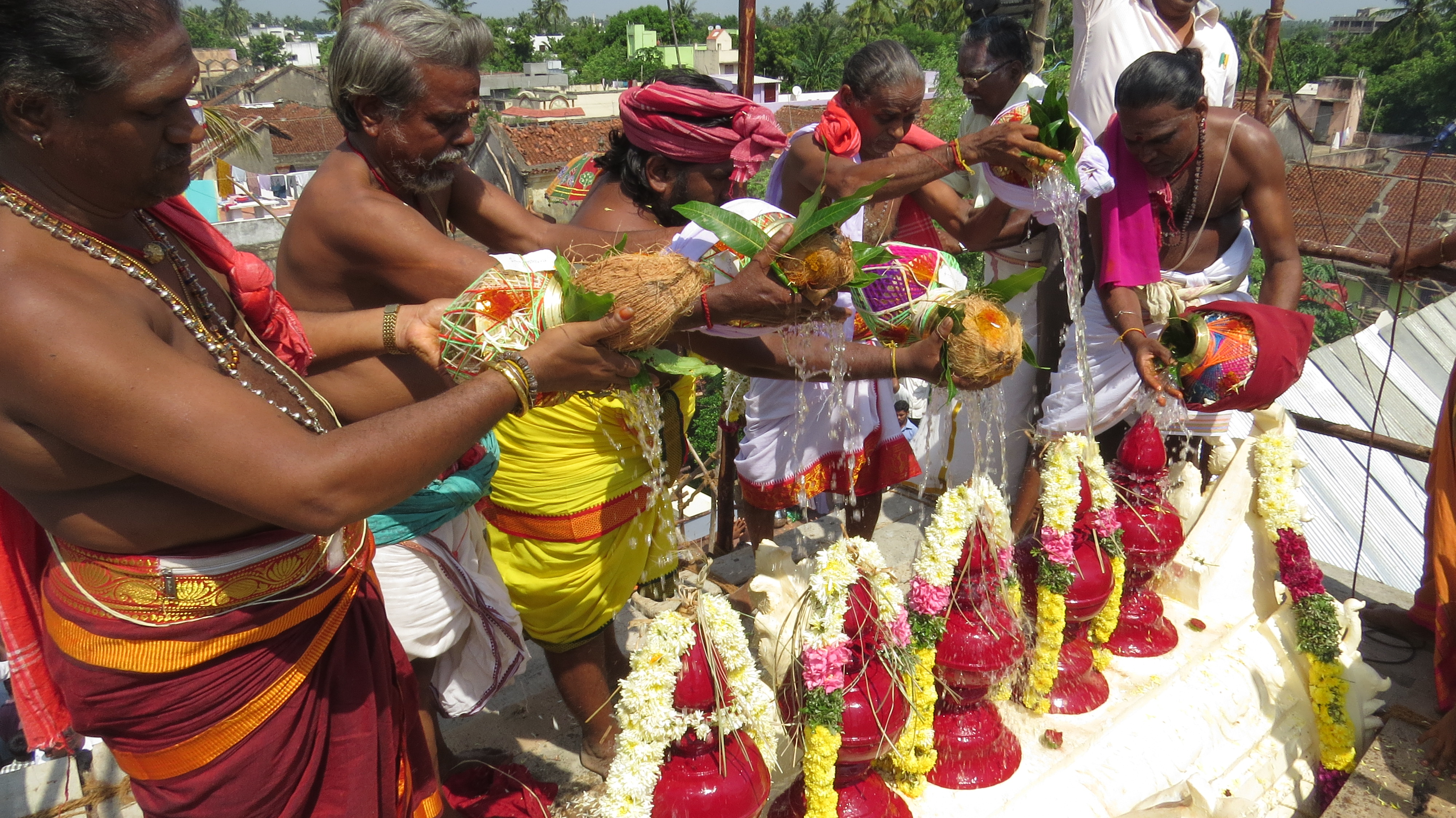
Kumbhabhishekham being performed

'Kumbhabhishekam' is derived from the combination of two Sanskrit words: '"kumbha," meaning "pot," and 'abhishekam' meaning "pouring" or "sprinkling." The terms refers to the pouring of sacred waters collected in the kumbha over the kalasha of the temple during the consecration ceremony. In Hinduism, this ritual confers divine powers to temples and murtis. 'Samprokshanam' is used synonymously with "consecration ceremony" and broadly means purification, and used in Vaishanva temples. Sometimes, the prefix 'maha' is added, which means 'great'.

'Astabandhana', a term usually used in association with the consecration of temples, is derived from the Sanskrit words 'asta' meaning eight and 'bandhana' meaning tying or fixing, and denotes the eight ingredients that form the paste that is used to fix an icon or idol of a Hindu god to the pedestal. These eight ingredients include shellac (jatu), hematite (gairika), beeswax (siktha), agarwood resin (guggulu), molasses (gula), sesame oil (taila), limestone powder (sarkaracurṇa), white dammar resin (sarja), and butter (navanita).

== Rituals ==
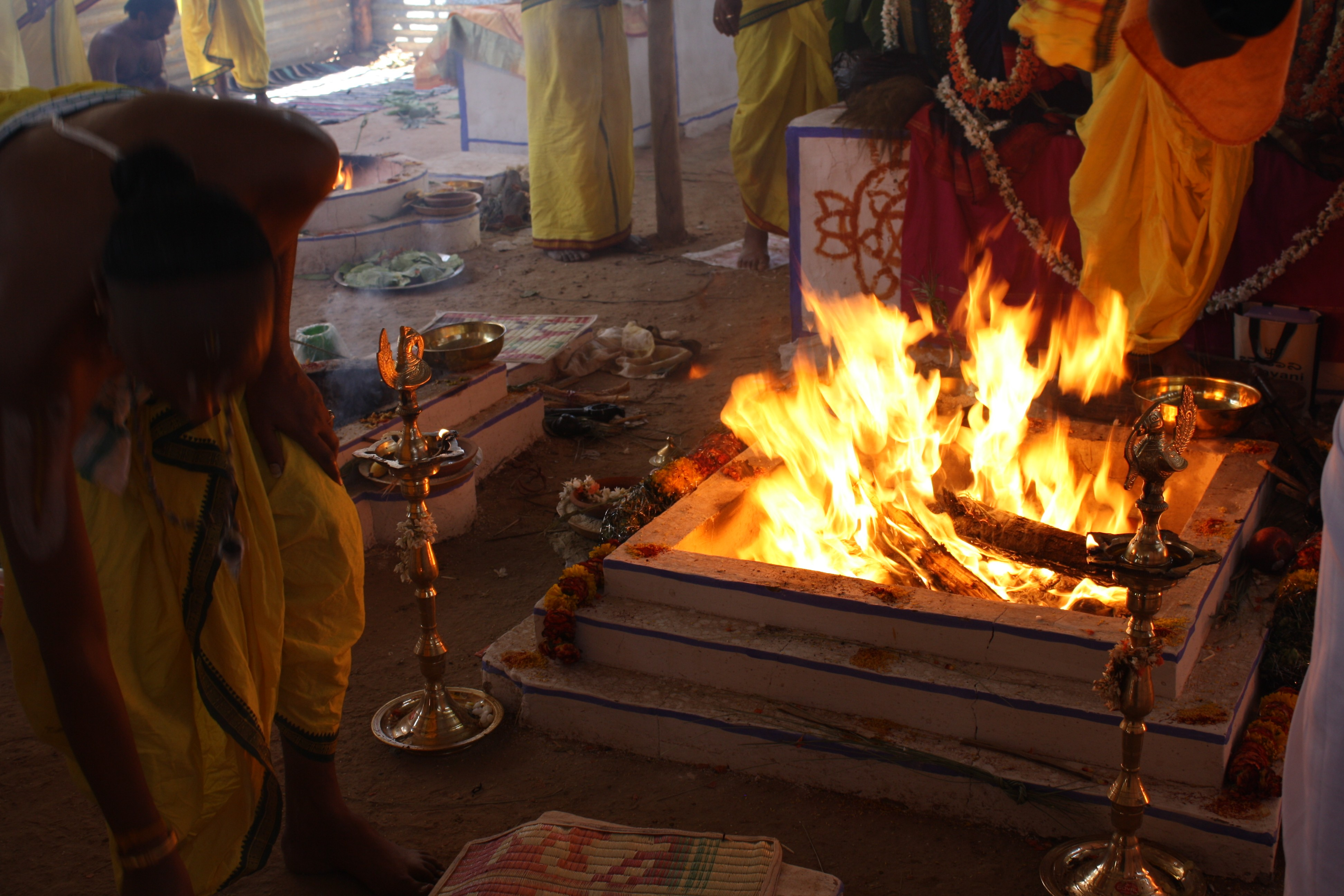
Yagna being performed at the yaga sala

Kumbhabhishekam is an important ritual in the consecration of a Hindu temple. It is usually part of a multi day event which culminates in the ceremony. The rituals are performed by a group of Hindu priests, who chant various mantras and perform yajnas. The yajna, which involves lighting the sacred fire, and offerings to the fire, is conducted in a temporary yaga sala, set up for the ceremony. The priests often tie a protective thread (raksha bandhana) around their wrists signifying their commitment to the rituals. The ceremony often begins with prayers to Ganesha to remove any obstacles to the event, and a bhumi puja, performed to invoke the blessings of Bhuma Devi (mother Earth).

In the yaga sala, kumbhas (pots), filled with sacred water and decorated with mango leaves and coconuts placed on top, are arranged near the fire pits, and pujas are performed. Various offerings such as food grains, flowers, ghee, and honey are offered to the sacred fire. The rituals at the yaga sala conclude with purnahuati, the final offering and prayer of completion. The priests then carry the sacred water pots in a procession around the temple. The water is then poured over the kalashas, mounted atop the shikhara or gopurams (towers). The idols of the gods are also bathed with the water, and special abhisheka and pujas are performed. The consecrated water is sprinkled over the temple premises and the gathered devotees.

As per Hindu literature, the ritual is believed to invoke and attract divine energy. The ritual usually attract large crowds as the participants are said to get positive benefits from the sprinkling of the holy water.
