= Prakaram =

Enclosure walls in Indian architecture

A prakaram (प्राकारः in Sanskrit ; also spelled pragaram or pragaaram in Indian English) in Indian architecture is an outer part around the Hindu temple sanctum. They may be enclosed or open and are typically enclosed for the innermost prakaram. As per Hindu religious practices, devotees start to come around the outer prakarams to the inner most before entering the sanctum.

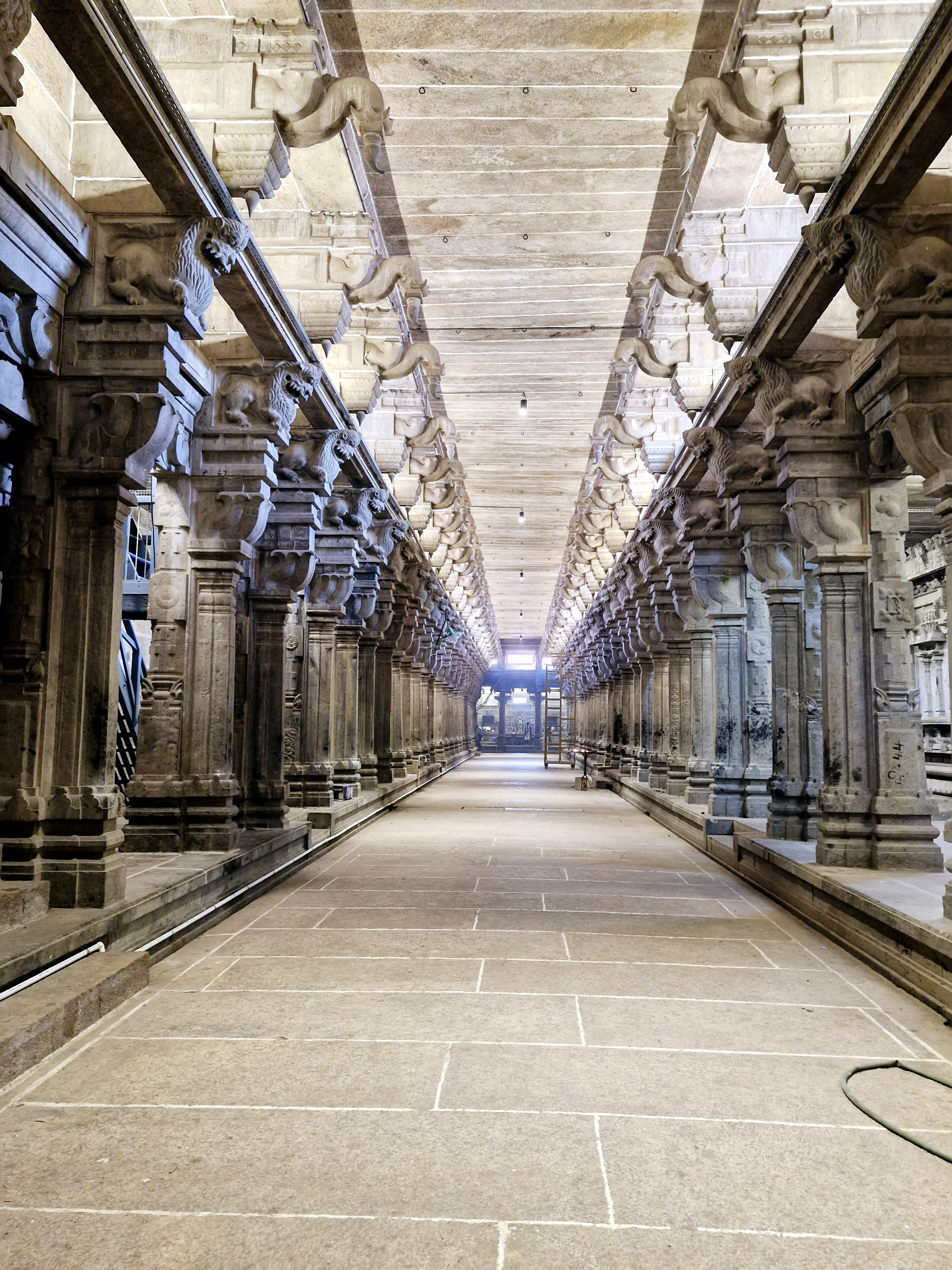
Image of Prakaram in Mayuranathaswami Temple, Mayiladuthurai

Most of the historic South Indian cities following the « Temple city » urban typology, as like Srirangam, Sirkali, Thiruvarur and Chidambaram, were built around large temples in the center of the city. The streets of the city act as extension of the prakarams of the temple.

== Temple architecture ==
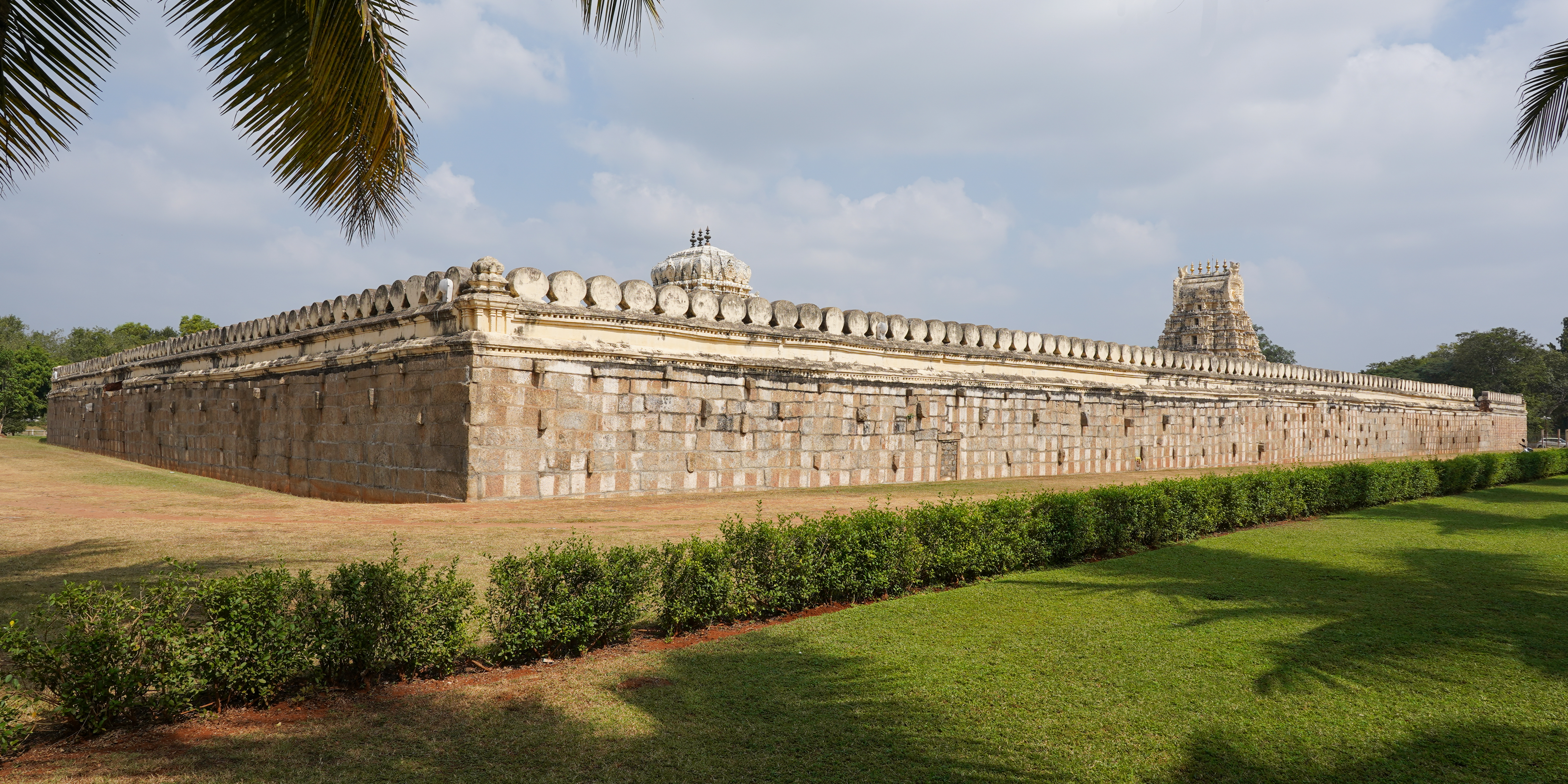
Image of Prakaram in Ranganathaswamy Temple, Srirangapatna

In the Hindu temple, the prakaram is the temple compound around the sanctum. Typically a Hindu temple prayer hall is generally built in front of the temple's sanctum sanctorum (garbhagriha). Usually large Hindu temples have one or more prakarams. The Prakaram acts as circumambulatory passage to the devotees to come around the sanctum. Based on the size of the temple, there can be more than one Prakaram with the smaller one enclosed within the larger. As per Hindu religious practices, devotees start to come around the outer prakarams to the inner most before entering the sanctum. This is indicative of the belief that the devotees have to lose the outermost bondage to the inner most one before attaining divinity. The method is also indicative of reduction of noises in the outer space to the inner most to increase communiion with god.

Ramanathaswamy Temple has outer set of corridors is reputed to be the longest in the world, measuring about 6.9 m in height, 400 feet each in the east and west and about 640 feet in the north and the south. The inner corridors are about 224 feet each in the east and the west and about 352 feet each in the north and the south.

== Religious significance ==
The Hindu temple structure resembles the human body with all its subtleties. The five walls encircling one another are the koshas (sheaths) of human existence. The outermost is the Annamaya kosha, symbolizing the material body. The second is Pranamaya kosha, symbolizing the sheath of vital force or prana (breath). The third is Manomaya kosha, symbolizing the sheath of the thoughts, the mana. The fourth is the Vijnanamaya kosha, symbolizing, the sheath of the intellect. The fifth and innermost is the Anandamaya kosha, symbolizing the sheath of bliss.

== Temple cities ==
Most of the historic South Indian cities like Madurai, Srirangam, Sirkali, Thiruvarur and Chidambaram were built around large temples in the center of the city. The streets of the city act as extension of the prakarams of the temple. These squares retain their traditional names of Aadi, Chittirai, Avani-moola and Masi streets, corresponding to the Tamil month names and also to the festivals associated. The temple prakarams and streets accommodate an elaborate festival calendar in which dramatic processions circumambulate the shrines at varying distances from the centre. The temple chariots used in processions are progressively larger in size based on the size of the concentric streets. Ancient Tamil classics record the temple as the centre of the city and the surrounding streets. The city's axes were aligned with the four-quarters of the compass, and the four gateways of the temple provided access to it. The wealthy and higher echelons of the society were placed in streets close to the temple, while the poorest were placed in the fringe streets.

== See also ==
- Samut Prakan province, Thai province
