= List of deemed universities =

Deemed university, or deemed-to-be-university, is an accreditation granted to higher educational institutions in India by the Department of Higher Education. As of 14 November 2023, the UGC lists 124 institutes which were granted the deemed to be university status. In 2017, a distinct category of deemed universities was established called Institutions of Eminence Deemed to be Universities, which are regulated differently from other deemed universities to develop into world-class institutions.

== List of universities ==
The following instituted were granted the deemed to be university status.

Deemed universities of India
State	Institute	Location	Established	Specialisation	Sources
Andaman and Nicobar Islands	Netaji Subhash Chandra Bose Institute of Higher Learning	Sri Vijaya Puram	2024	Multi-disciplinary	
Andhra Pradesh	Audisankara (Deemed to be University)	Gudur	2001 (2025)	Multidisciplinary	
Andhra Pradesh	Dr. RVR NRI Institute of Technology	Agiripalli	2007(2008)	Technology	
Andhra Pradesh	GMR Institute of Technology	Rajam	1997 (2026)	Technology	
Andhra Pradesh	Gandhi Institute of Technology and Management	Visakhapatnam	1980 (2007)	Multidisciplinary	
Andhra Pradesh	Koneru Lakshmaiah Education Foundation	Vaddeswaram	1980 (2009)	Multidisciplinary	
Andhra Pradesh	Madanapalle Institute of Technology and Science	Madanapalle	1998 (2025)	Technology	
Andhra Pradesh	Siddhartha Academy of Higher Education	Vijayawada	1977 (2024)	Multidisciplinary	
Andhra Pradesh	Sri Sathya Sai Institute of Higher Learning	Anantapur	1981 (1981)	Multidisciplinary	
Andhra Pradesh	Vignan's Foundation for Science, Technology & Research	Guntur	1997 (2008)	Technology	
Arunachal Pradesh	North Eastern Regional Institute of Science and Technology	Itanagar	1986 (2005)	Technology	
Assam	Central Institute of Technology, Kokrajhar	Kokrajhar	1959 (2006)	Technology	
Bihar	Nava Nalanda Mahavihara	Nalanda	1951 (2006)	Buddhist Studies	
Chandigarh	Punjab Engineering College	Chandigarh	1921 (2003)	Technology	
Chandigarh	National Institute of Technical Teachers Training & Research (NITTTR)	Chandigarh	1967 (2024)	Education	
Delhi	Indian Agricultural Research Institute	New Delhi	1905 (1958)	Agricultural Science	
Delhi	Indian Institute of Foreign Trade	South West Delhi	1963 (2002)	Management	
Delhi	Indian Law Institute	New Delhi	1956 (2004)	Law	
Delhi	Institute of Liver and Biliary Sciences	South West Delhi	2009	Medical Sciences	
Delhi	Jamia Hamdard	New Delhi	1948 (1989)	Multidisciplinary	
Delhi	Morarji Desai National Institute of Yoga	New Delhi	1998 (2021)	Yoga	
Delhi	National Museum Institute of the History of Art, Conservation and Museology	New Delhi	1983 (1989)	Museology	
Delhi	National Institute of Electronics & Information Technology	New Delhi	1994 (2020)	Technology	
Delhi	National Council of Educational Research and Training	South Delhi	1961 (2023)	Education	
Delhi	National Institute of Educational Planning and Administration	South West Delhi	1962 (2006)	Education	
Delhi	TERI School of Advanced Studies	South West Delhi	1998 (1999)	Applied Science	
Gujarat	Gujarat Vidyapith	Ahmedabad	1920 (1963)	Multidisciplinary	
Gujarat	Sumandeep Vidyapeeth	Waghodia	1999 (2007)	Medical Sciences	
Haryana	Lingaya's Vidyapeeth	Faridabad	1998 (2005)	Technology, Management	
Haryana	Maharishi Markandeshwar (Deemed to be University)	Ambala	1993 (2007)	Multidisciplinary	
Haryana	Manav Rachna International Institute of Research and Studies	Faridabad	1997 (2008)	Technology	
Haryana	National Brain Research Centre	Manesar	1997 (2002)	Neuroscience	
Haryana	National Dairy Research Institute	Karnal	1923 (1989)	Dairy Research	
Jharkhand	Birla Institute of Technology, Mesra	Ranchi	1955 (1986)	Technology	
Jharkhand	National Institute of Advanced Manufacturing Technology	Ranchi	1966 (2024)	Technology	
Karnataka	BLDE (Deemed to be University)	Bijapur	2008	Medical Sciences	
Karnataka	Christ (Deemed to be University)	Bengaluru	1969 (2008)	Multidisciplinary	
Karnataka	Indian Institute for Human Settlements (IIHS)	Bengaluru	2025	Interdisciplinary	
Karnataka	International Institute of Information Technology Bangalore	Bengaluru	1999 (2005)	Technology	
Karnataka	JSS Academy of Higher Education & Research	Mysore	2008	Medical Sciences	
Karnataka	Jain (Deemed to be University)	Bengaluru	1990 (2008)	Multidisciplinary	
Karnataka	Jawaharlal Nehru Centre for Advanced Scientific Research	Bengaluru	1989 (2002)	Science	
Karnataka	Kristu Jayanti (Deemed to be University)	Bengaluru	1999 (2025)	Multidisciplinary	
Karnataka	KLE Academy of Higher Education & Research	Belgaum	2006	Multidisciplinary	
Karnataka	Manipal Academy of Higher Education	Udupi	1953	Multidisciplinary	
Karnataka	Mount Carmel (Deemed to be University)	Bengaluru	1944 (2026)	Multidisciplinary	
Karnataka	NITTE (Deemed to be University)	Mangaluru	2008	Medical Sciences	
Karnataka	Sri Devaraj Urs Academy of Higher Education and Research	Kolar	1986 (2007)	Medical Sciences	
Karnataka	Sri Siddhartha Academy of Higher Education	Tumkur	2008	Medical Sciences	
Karnataka	Swami Vivekananda Yoga Anusandhana Samsthana	Bengaluru	2002	Yoga	
Karnataka	St. Aloysius (Deemed to be University)	Mangaluru	1880 (2024)	Multidisciplinary	
Karnataka	Yenepoya (Deemed to be University)	Mangaluru	1991 (2008)	Medical Sciences	
Kerala	Indian Institute of Space Science and Technology	Thiruvananthapuram	2007 (2008)	Space Science	
Kerala	Chinmaya Vishwavidyapeeth	Ernakulam	2016	Multidisciplinary	
Kerala	Kerala Kalamandalam	Thrissur	1930 (2006)	Performing Arts	
Ladakh	Central Institute of Buddhist Studies	Leh	2006 (2018)	Buddhist Studies	
Madhya Pradesh	Lakshmibai National Institute of Physical Education	Gwalior	1957 (1995)	Physical Education	
Madhya Pradesh	Indian Institute of Forest Management	Bhopal	1982	Forestry	
Madhya Pradesh	National Institute of Technical Teachers Training & Research (NITTTR)	Bhopal	1967 (2024)	Education	
Madhya Pradesh	Madhav Institute of Technology and Science	Gwalior	1957 (2024)	Technology	
Madhya Pradesh	Prestige Institute of Management and Research (PIMR)	Indore	1994	Management	
Maharashtra	Bharati Vidyapeeth	Pune	1964 (1996)	Multidisciplinary	
Maharashtra	Central Institute of Fisheries Education	Mumbai	1961 (1989)	Fisheries Science	
Maharashtra	D. Y. Patil	Navi Mumbai	1989 (2002)	Multidisciplinary	
Maharashtra	D. Y. Patil Education Society	Kolhapur	1987 (2005)	Multidisciplinary	
Maharashtra	Datta Meghe Institute of Medical Sciences	Wardha	1950 (2005)	Medical Sciences	
Maharashtra	Deccan College Post-Graduate and Research Institute	Pune	1821 (1990)	Archeology and Linguistics	
Maharashtra	Defence Institute of Advanced Technology	Pune	1952 (2000)	Technology	
Maharashtra	Dr. D. Y. Patil Vidyapeeth	Pune	1996 (2003)	Medical Sciences	
Maharashtra	Gokhale Institute of Politics and Economics	Pune	1930 (1993)	Economics	
Maharashtra	Homi Bhabha National Institute	Mumbai	2005	Science	
Maharashtra	Indira Gandhi Institute of Development Research	Mumbai	1987 (1995)	Economics	
Maharashtra	Institute of Chemical Technology	Mumbai	1933 (2008)	Technology	
Maharashtra	International Institute for Population Sciences	Mumbai	1956 (1985)	Population Science	
Maharashtra	Krishna Institute of Medical Sciences	Satara	1982 (2005)	Medical Sciences	
Maharashtra	MGM Institute of Health Sciences	Navi Mumbai	1982 (2006)	Medical Sciences	
Maharashtra	Narsee Monjee Institute of Management Studies	Mumbai	1981 (2003)	Multidisciplinary	
Maharashtra	Pravara Institute of Medical Sciences	Ahmednagar	1976 (2003)	Medical Sciences	
Maharashtra	Sir J.J.School of Art, Architecture & Design, Mumbai	Mumbai	1857 (2023)	Arts	
Maharashtra	Symbiosis International	Pune	1971 (2002)	Multidisciplinary	
Maharashtra	Tata Institute of Fundamental Research	Mumbai	1945 (2002)	Science	
Maharashtra	Tata Institute of Social Sciences	Mumbai	1936 (1964)	Social Science	
Maharashtra	Tilak Maharashtra Vidyapeeth	Pune	1921 (1987)	Multidisciplinary	
Odisha	Kalinga Institute of Industrial Technology	Bhubaneswar	2004	Multidisciplinary	
Odisha	Kalinga Institute of Social Sciences	Bhubaneswar	1993 (2017)	Social Science	
Odisha	Siksha 'O' Anusandhan	Bhubaneswar	2007	Multidisciplinary	
Puducherry	Sri Balaji Vidyapeeth	Pondicherry	2001 (2008)	Medical Sciences	
Punjab	National Institute of Electronics and Information Technology (NIELIT)	Ropar	2023	IT	
Punjab	Sant Longowal Institute of Engineering and Technology	Sangrur	1989 (2007)	Technology	
Punjab	Thapar Institute of Engineering and Technology	Patiala	1956 (1985)	Technology	
Rajasthan	Banasthali Vidyapith	Tonk	1935 (1983)	Multidisciplinary	
Rajasthan	IIS (Deemed to be University)	Jaipur	1995 (2009)	Multidisciplinary	
Rajasthan	Institute of Advanced Studies in Education	Churu	1950 (2002)	Education	
Rajasthan	Jain Vishva Bharati Institute	Ladnun	1991	Jain Studies	
Rajasthan	Janardan Rai Nagar Rajasthan Vidyapeeth	Udaipur	1937 (1987)	Multidisciplinary	
Rajasthan	LNM Institute of Information Technology	Jaipur	2003 (2006)	Technology	
Rajasthan	National Institute of Ayurveda	Jaipur	1976 (2020)	Ayurveda	
Tamil Nadu	Academy of Maritime Education and Training	Chennai	1993 (2007)	Marine Science	
Tamil Nadu	Amrita Vishwa Vidyapeetham	Coimbatore	1994 (2003)	Multidisciplinary	
Tamil Nadu	Avinashilingam Institute for Home Science and Higher Education for Women	Coimbatore	1957 (1988)	Home Science	
Tamil Nadu	B.S. Abdur Rahman Crescent Institute of Science and Technology	Chennai	1984 (2008)	Technology	
Tamil Nadu	Bharath Institute of Higher Education and Research	Chennai	1984 (2002)	Multidisciplinary	
Tamil Nadu	Chennai Mathematical Institute	Siruseri	1989 (2006)	Mathematics	
Tamil Nadu	Chettinad Academy of Research and Education	Chengalpattu	2005 (2008)	Medical Sciences	
Tamil Nadu	Dr. M.G.R. Educational and Research Institute	Chennai	1988 (2003)	Multidisciplinary	
Tamil Nadu	Gandhigram Rural Institute	Dindigul	1956 (1976)	Rural Education	
Tamil Nadu	Hindustan Institute of Technology and Science	Chennai	1985 (2008)	Technology	
Tamil Nadu	Kalasalingam Academy of Research and Education	Krishnankoil	1984 (2006)	Multidisciplinary	
Tamil Nadu	Karpagam Academy of Higher Education	Coimbatore	2008	Multidisciplinary	
Tamil Nadu	Karunya Institute of Technology and Sciences	Coimbatore	1986 (2004)	Technology	
Tamil Nadu	Meenakshi Academy of Higher Education and Research	Chennai	2001	Medical Sciences	
Tamil Nadu	Noorul Islam Centre for Higher Education	Kumarakovil	1989 (2008)	Multidisciplinary	
Tamil Nadu	National Institute of Technical Teachers' Training and Research, Chennai	Chennai	1964	Education	
Tamil Nadu	Periyar Maniammai Institute of Science & Technology	Vallam	1988 (2007)	Technology	
Tamil Nadu	Ponnaiyah Ramajayam Institute of Science and Technology	Thanjavur	1985 (2008)	Technology	
Tamil Nadu	Sathyabama Institute of Science and Technology	Chennai	1987 (2001)	Technology	
Tamil Nadu	Saveetha Institute of Medical And Technical Sciences	Chennai	1986 (2005)	Multidisciplinary	
Tamil Nadu	Shanmugha Arts, Science, Technology & Research Academy	Thanjavur	1984 (2001)	Multidisciplinary	
Tamil Nadu	Sri Chandrasekharendra Saraswathi Viswa Mahavidyalaya	Kanchipuram	1993	Multidisciplinary	
Tamil Nadu	Sri Ramachandra Medical College and Research Institute	Chennai	1985 (1994)	Medical Sciences	
Tamil Nadu	SRM Institute of Science and Technology	Kanchipuram	1985 (2002)	Technology	
Tamil Nadu	St. Peter's Institute of Higher Education and Research	Chennai	1992 (2008)	Technology	
Tamil Nadu	Vel Tech Rangarajan Dr. Sagunthala R&D Institute of Science and Technology	Chennai	2008	Technology	
Tamil Nadu	Vels Institute of Science, Technology & Advanced Studies	Chennai	1992 (2008)	Technology	
Tamil Nadu	Vinayaka Mission's Research Foundation	Salem	1981 (2001)	Multidisciplinary	
Tamil Nadu	Vellore Institute of Technology	Vellore	1984 (2001)	Technology	
Telangana	Aurora Higher Education and Research Academy	Hyderabad	1989 (2022)	Technology	
Telangana	Chaitanya University	Warangal	1991 (2010)	Multidiscipline	
Telangana	ICFAI Foundation for Higher Education	Hyderabad	1995 (2008)	Technology, Management	
Telangana	International Institute of Information Technology, Hyderabad	Hyderabad	1998 (2001)	Technology	
Uttar Pradesh	Central Institute of Higher Tibetan Studies	Varanasi	1967 (1988)	Tibetan Studies	
Uttar Pradesh	Dayalbagh Educational Institute	Agra	1917 (1981)	Multidisciplinary	
Uttar Pradesh	Indian Veterinary Research Institute	Bareilly	1889 (1983)	Veterinary Science	
Uttar Pradesh	Jaypee Institute of Information Technology	Noida	2001 (2004)	Technology	
Uttar Pradesh	Nehru Gram Bharati	Prayagraj	1962 (2008)	Multidisciplinary	
Uttar Pradesh	Santosh (Deemed to be University)	Ghaziabad	1999 (2025)	Medical	
Uttar Pradesh	KIET Deemed to be University	Ghaziabad	1999	Technology	
Uttar Pradesh	Shobhit Institute of Engineering & Technology	Meerut	2000 (2006)	Technology	
Uttar Pradesh	Uttarakhand	Forest Research Institute	Dehradun	1906 (1991)	Forestry
Graphic Era (Deemed to be University)	Uttarakhand	1993 (2008)	Dehradun	Technology, Management	
Gurukul Kangri (Deemed to be University)	Uttarakhand	Haridwar	1902 (1962)	Multidisciplinary	
West Bengal	Ramakrishna Mission Vivekananda Educational and Research Institute	Belur	2005	Multidisciplinary	
West Bengal	Satyajit Ray Film and Television Institute	Kolkata	1995 (2024)	Film school	
West Bengal	Indian Association for the Cultivation of Science	Kolkata	1876 (2018)	Basic & Applied Sciences	
West Bengal	TCG CREST	Kolkata	2020 (2024)	Science and Technology	
West Bengal	National Institute of Technical Teachers' Training and Research, Kolkata	Kolkata	1965 (2024)	Education	

== List of Institutions of Eminence Deemed to be Universities ==
IoE Deemed to be universities of India
Institute	State	Location	Established	Specialisation	Sources
BITS Pilani	Rajasthan	Pilani	1946 (1964)	Science and Technology	
Manipal Academy of Higher Education	Karnataka	Manipal	1953 (1993)	Multidisciplinary	
Indian Institute of Science	Karnataka	Bengaluru	1909 (1958)	Science and Technology	
Shiv Nadar University	Uttar Pradesh	Greater Noida	2011 (2022)	Multidisciplinary	
O. P. Jindal Global University	Haryana	Sonipat	2009 (2020)	Liberal Arts	

== Note ==
In many cases, the same listing by the UGC covers several institutes. For example, the listing for Homi Bhabha National Institute covers the Institute of Mathematical Sciences, the Indira Gandhi Centre for Atomic Research and other institutes. The list above includes only the major institute granted the status, and such additional institutes are not listed separately. The date of establishment listed is the date reported by the institute. The date in parentheses is the date in which the institute was granted deemed university status.

== See also ==
- List of autonomous higher education institutes in India
- List of universities in India
- List of central universities in India
- List of private universities in India
- List of state universities in India
