= Noorul Islam Centre for Higher Education =

University in India

- Former name: Noorul Islam College of Engineering
- Motto: Lightning to be Lighten
- Type: Deemed University
- Established: 1989
- Affiliations: UGC, AICTE
- Chancellor: A. P. Majeed Khan
- Vice-Chancellor: Tessy Thomas
- Students: 3500
- Undergraduates: 3000
- Postgraduates: 500
- Location: Kumarakovil, Tamil Nadu, 629180, India; 8.251178°N 77.351156°E
- Campus: 47 acres (19 ha)
- Website: www.niuniv.com
- Location within Tamil Nadu

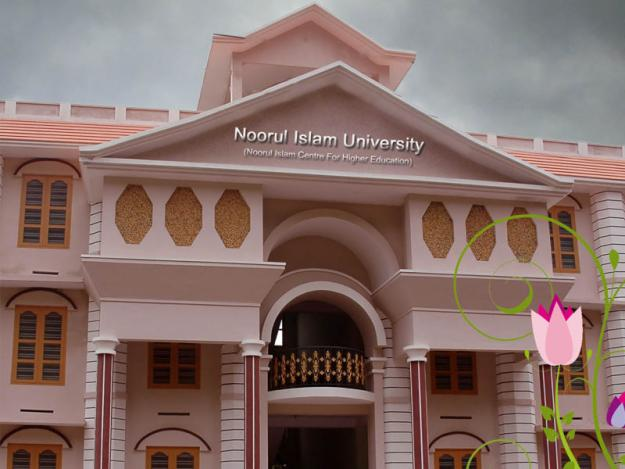
Noorul Islam University

Noorul Islam Centre for Higher Education (NICHE), formerly Noorul Islam College of Engineering, is a private co-educational Institution in Kumarakovil, Thuckalay, Kanyakumari District, Tamil Nadu, India. The institution was founded in 1989 by A.P. Majeed Khan and it was declared as a Deemed to be University by the Ministry of Human Resource Development, Govt. of India at 8 December 2008. It is now run by Noorul Islam Centre for Higher Education (NICHE) Society.

== Status ==
The university is approved by the University Grants Commission, All India Council for Technical Education and is accredited by the National Assessment and Accreditation Council (NAAC). It has been given an overall 'A' Grade by NAAC. According to National Institutional Ranking Framework Ranking, Noorul Islam Centre for Higher Education was in 544th place as of their 2017 ranking among 819 universities in India.

== Academics and research ==
=== Admissions ===
Noorul Islam Centre for Higher Education follows an entrance exam based system of admission and an interview based admission where academically challenged students can join. A yearly entrance exam, Noorul Islam Entrance Exam, is conducted. The admissions from this exam are decided based on merit. Additionally Merit based scholarships are provided to students having spectacular academic results.

=== Academic organisation and accreditation ===
This Institution is an ISO 9001:2000 Certified Institution.

Noorul Islam Centre for Higher Education has consolidated different disciplines into seven Schools of Excellence. Its programmes are recognised by a range of accreditation boards including International Accreditation Organization (IAO), USA, NBA, New Delhi and Institute of Engineers (India). The institution is recognised as SIRO of DST, Govt. of India in 2008. Accreditation of all eligible programs by NBA, AICTE. Popularization of science award to the institution by the Government of Tamil Nadu 2002. Award of Patent for the new innovation AVID (Artificial Visual Implant Device) patented in the name of NICE up to 2024. Listed under section 2(f) of UGC Act 1956 - (F. 8-123/2006 (CPP-I))

== Campus ==
The Noorul Islam Centre for Higher Education is on the rocky face of Velimalai. The exact place is Kumaracoil, a part of Western Ghat hills. Padmanabhapuram, the capital of erstwhile Travancore is only 4.9 km away. Not too far, at 4 km distance is the Thuckalay Town. Noorul Islam Centre for Higher Education is only a vocal-distance from the famous Lord Velmuruga Temple at Kumaracoil. It is only 15 km from Nagercoil, the district headquarters of Kanyakumari and 1.5 km from the NH-47.

The women's hostel is on the Institution campus whereas the men's hostel and the football ground are outside the compound but nearby

The Institution encourages sports by providing basketball courts, and a football ground.

The college has a networked campus in which all the departments are connected using optical fibre network to implement information sharing, communication, application access, and internet connection through VSAT. There is full Wifi on campus and in hostels.

A satellite station is provided and video conferencing facilities are available. There is an auditorium at the top of the campus premises named 'Hill-Top Auditorium.'

== Departments ==
Allied Health Science, Software Engineering, Aeronautical Engineering, Aerospace Engineering, Automobile Engineering, Civil Engineering, Computer Science Engineering, Electronics and Communication Engineering, Electrical and Electronics Engineering, Electronics and Instrumentation Engineering, Marine Engineering, Biomedical Science and Technology, Mechanical Engineering, Information Technology, Nano Technology, Management Studies, Computer Applications, Science and Humanities, Aircraft Maintenance Engineering, Avionics Engineering, Fire Technology and Safety Engineering.

== Institutions/organisations under Noorul Islam Educational Trust ==
- Noorul Islam Industrial Training Centre, Amaravila, Trivandrum, Kerala
- Noorul Islam Polytechnic College, Punkarai, Kanyakumari, Tamil Nadu
- Noorul Islam Centre for Higher Education, Kumaracoil, Thuckalay, Kanyakumari, Tamil Nadu
- Noorul Islam Community College, Kumaracoil, Thuckalay, Kanyakumari, Tamil Nadu
- Noorul Islam College of Arts and Science, Kumaracoil, Thuckalay, Kanyakumari, Tamil Nadu
- Noorul Islam College of Dental Science, Aralumoodu, Trivandrum, Kerala
- Noorul Islam Multi Speciality Hospital, Aralumoodu, Trivandrum, Kerala

== Activities ==
=== NICHE Aeroclub ===
NICHE Aeroclub was started in 2011, with the aim to enhance interest and practical knowledge in Aeronautical & Aerospace Engineering. It regularly organises aeromodeling workshops, guest lectures, and video conferencing with eminent scientists. It conducts technical events in Aviators - Annual Tech Symposium of Aeronautical Engineering.

=== Satellite ===
Noorul Islam Centre for Higher Education (NICHE) launched up its own satellite named "NIUSAT" on 23 June 2017 aboard PSLV-C38 with ISRO help. The Rs.5-crore satellite is being used for agricultural applications and facilitate higher education. The satellite fabrication was performed under the watchful guidance of 18 former Indian Space Research Organisation (ISRO) employees who now work at the Noorul Islam Centre for Higher Education.
