= Hermann F. Sailer =

German physician, dentist and surgeon

Hermann F. Sailer (born April 17, 1943) is a German maxillofacial surgeon. He leads the Klinik Professor Sailer in Zürich and is the founder of the Cleft-Children International Foundation.

== Life and scientific career ==
Sailer was born on April 17, 1943 in Erlangen. He studied medicine from 1962 to 1968, dentistry from 1968 to 1971 at the University of Erlangen... and received the degree of Doctor of Medicine (Dr. med.) and then Doctor of Dentistry (Dr. med. dent). He completed further studies in the fields of internal medicine, gynaecology, surgery and maxillofacial surgery (1970 under Gerhard Steinhardt) and then in surgery and emergency surgery (1971/72 at the University of Würzburg under Ernst Kern). He thereafter went to Zürich to work at the university hospital there (1972–76). Under the tutelage of Hugo Obwegeser Sailer completed his knowledge in the department of maxillofacial surgery. Sailer was working as a Research Fellow at the Royal College of Surgeons of England and later in Boston, USA he worked in the department of facial plastic surgery under the guidance of R. Webster. In 1980 Sailer obtained his postdoctoral qualification (habilitation).

From 1985 onwards, Sailer was an Associate professor for maxillofacial surgery at the University hospital in Zürich. In 1987, he was appointed as Chairman and Director of the Hospital and the Policlinic for Maxillofacial Surgery of the University Hospital Zürich, the Clinic for Oral Surgery and Oral Diagnosis and the Department for Maxillofacial Radiology at the Institute of Dentistry of the University of Zurich. From 1989 to 1994, he was the medical director of the institute for dentistry of the University of Zurich. From 1996 to 1998, he presided over the European Association for Cranio Maxillo Facial Surgery. Sailer has published upward of 300 scientific works in the field of oral and maxillofacial surgery.

In 2002, Sailer founded the Klinik Professor Sailer in Zürich. The clinic focuses on cosmetic maxillofacial and oral surgery and the surgical treatment of Obstructive Sleep Apnea.

== Research ==
In 1983 Sailer described a new operative procedure in which lyophilized cartilage of organ donors is used as a replacement for patients’ bones. In the following decades the material has been tried and tested for reconstructions of all types in the region of the skull, jaws and the face. This saves the patient from undergoing a second operation for removal of bones and cartilage. Even completely lyophilized human mandibles were used successfully in patients.

In 1989, Sailer was the first to describe the use of dental implants simultaneously with the reconstruction of the atrophic maxilla.

Between 1992 and 2001 Sailer published several works on the production and application of bone-regenerating proteins (bone morphogenetic proteins) in collaboration with his colleagues Edit Kolb und Franz Weber. These proteins were designed to save the patient from undergoing an operative removal of the bone during reconstruction surgery in the region of the jaws and the face

Since the 1990s, Sailer has been working on the treatment of the obstructive sleep apnea syndrome. The main cause for this condition are extremely narrow upper respiratory (oropharyngeal) tracts. This anatomical situation that leads to respiratory arrests, decrease of oxygen in the blood and other symptoms like high blood pressure can be eliminated by the bimaxillary Rotation Advancement Operation developed by Sailer, where the upper respiratory tracts are dilated permanently

Sailer and his team were among the first people to develop the resorbable osteosynthetic materials. The osteosynthetic material made from resorbable lactic acid-based substances is used for fixation of bone fractures as well as for fixation of bones after orthopaedic operations of the skull, the mandible and the maxilla. The material developed can be bent in the cold state as well as moulded in the hot state. As it disintegrates on its own after a programmable period, no second operation for removal of the material is necessary, whereas in case of osteosynthesis with metallic materials a second operation is required

In his studies on human physiognomy Sailer put forth the theory that a new ideal of beauty was established in the 1930s and 1940s and that this ideal is the face that protrudes forward, called "Anteface" and its extreme version "Hyperanteface". This special growth of the face is seen today with top models, actresses and actors and winners of beauty contests

== Cleft-Children International Foundation ==
Sailer founded the Cleft-Children International (CCI) Foundation in 2000. The foundation manages centres where children with cleft lip and palate are operated free of charge. The primary focus of this assistance is in India, where there are cleft-centres (so-called Partner Clinics) run in Mangalore, Hyderabad, Chennai (Madras), Mumbai (Bombay) and Chenganoor (Kerala). Besides, there is also a cleft-centre in Romania. The concept of these centres encompass not only the performance of surgeries, but also scientific studies, e.g. reports on symphyseal mandibular cleft, reconstruction of nasal clefts, the prevalence of CLP in India or the vascular anatomy in cleft lips. A school for cleft-children was founded in Hyderabad in the year 2009.

Two support organisations were founded in Germany in the years 2005 and 2008 to support the activities of the CCI: the Cleft-Children-Aid, Professor Hermann-Sailer Foundation in Hannover and the Cleft-Children-Assistance, Professor Hermann-Sailer Foundation in Bielefeld.

== Selected publications ==
- Hermann F. Sailer: Transplantation of Lyophilized Cartilage in Maxillofacial Surgery: Experimental Foundations and Clinical Success. Karger, Basel 1983.
- Hermann F. Sailer, G. Pajarola: Atlas der Oralen Chirurgie. Thieme, Stuttgart 1996 (Translations: Italian 1997; Spanish 1997; English 1998, Portuguese 1998, Greek 2000, Turkish 2004).

== Awards and honours ==
- 1979: Martin Wassmund Prize of the German Association of Oral and Maxillofacial Surgeons
- 1979: Scientific award of the German Dental Association for the best publication of the year
- 1994: Doctor honoris causa of the University of Athens
- 1995: Doctor honoris causa of the University of Naples
- 1996: Fellow of Dental Surgery of the Royal College of Surgeons of England (FDSRCS)
- 1996: Professorship at the Scuola Internazionale di Odontoiatria, University of Rome
- 1996: Member of the German Academy of Natural Sciences, Leopoldina
- 1998: Member of the Swiss Academy of Medical Sciences
- 1999: Member of the Armenian Academy of Surgical Sciences
- 2000: Fellow of the Royal College of Surgeons of Edinburgh
- 2003: Honorary Member of the Spanish Association of OMS (1983-2006 16 further honorary memberships)
- 2007: Doctor of Science honoris causa of the Meenakshi University of Chennai, India
- 2009: Doctor med. et pharm. honoris causa of the University of Timișoara, Romania
- 2012: Lifetime Achievement Award of the International Cleft Lip and Palate Foundation (ICPF)
- 2014: CEO AWARD 2014 for the best private health care provider in Europe
