= Padmanabhapuram Palace =

Travancore era palace in Kanyakumari district, Tamil Nadu, India

Coordinates: 8.250916°N 77.326702°E

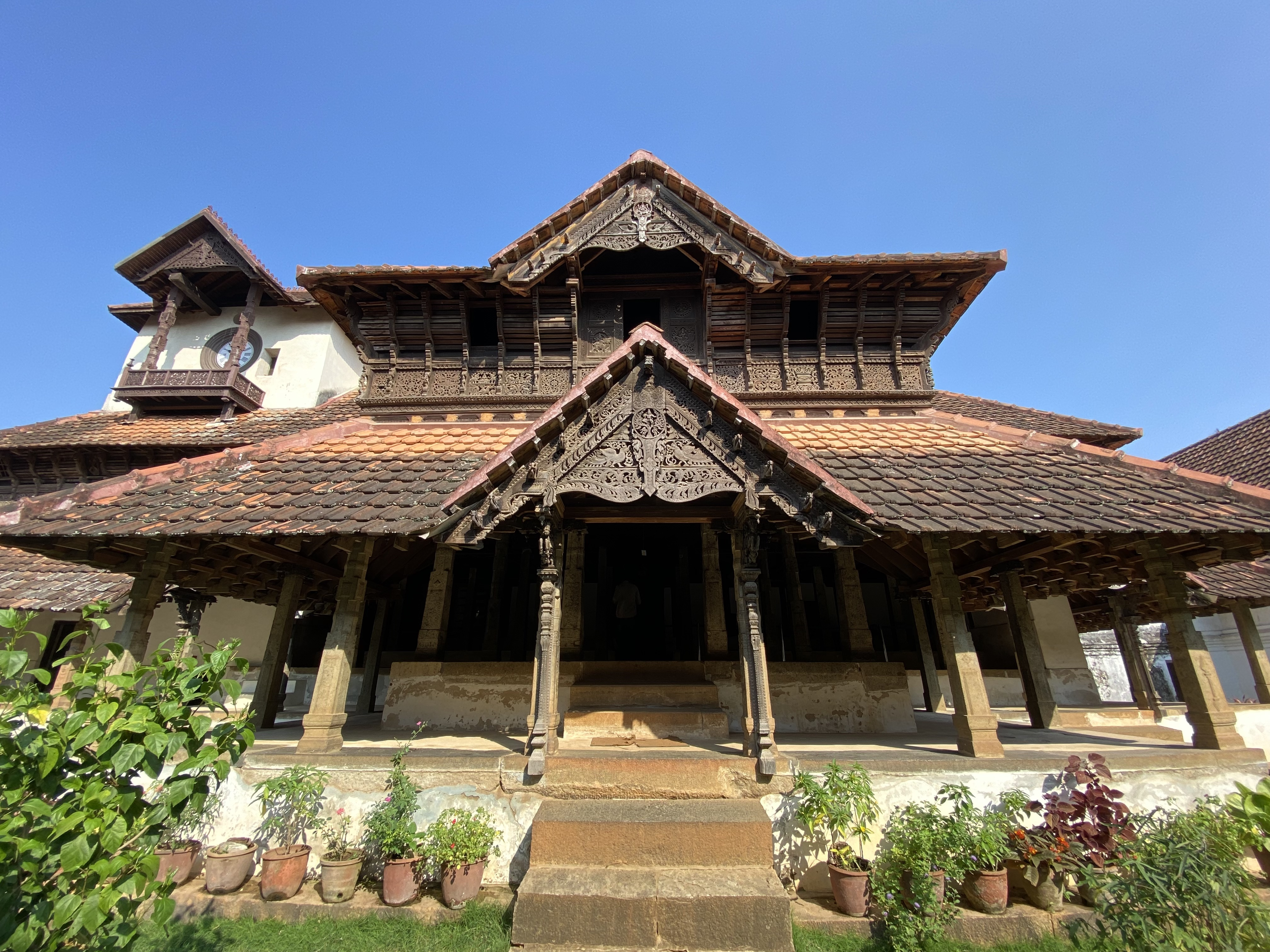
- Padmanabhapuram Palace, main entrance with the clock tower on the left corner

- Location within Tamil Nadu

General information
- Architectural style: Kerala architecture
- Location: Padmanabhapuram, India
- Construction started: 1601
- Client: Maharaja of Travancore, Iravi Varma Kulasekhara Perumal

Padmanabhapuram Palace, also known as Kalkulam Palace, is a Travancore-era palace located in Padmanabhapuram in the Kanyakumari district of the Indian state of Tamil Nadu. The palace is owned, controlled and maintained by the Kerala Government. Padmanabhapuram is the former capital city of the erstwhile kingdom of Travancore. It is around 20 km (12 mi) from Nagercoil, 39 km (24 mi) from Kanyakumari town and 52 km (32 mi) from Thiruvananthapuram in Kerala. The palace complex lies inside an old granite fortress around four kilometers long. The palace is located at the foot of the Veli Hills, part of the Western Ghats. The river Valli flows nearby.

== History ==
The palace was constructed around 1601 CE by Iravi Varma Kulasekhara Perumal who ruled Venad between 1592 and 1609. The founder of modern Travancore, King Anizham Thirunal Marthanda Varma (1706–1758) who ruled Travancore from 1729 to 1758, rebuilt the palace in around 1750. King Marthaanda Varma dedicated the kingdom to his family deity Sree Padmanabha, a form of Lord Vishnu and ruled the kingdom as Padmanabha dasa or servant of Lord Padmanabha. Hence the name Padmanabhapuram or City of Lord Padmanabha.

In 1795 the capital of Travancore was shifted from here to Thiruvananthapuram, and the place lost its former glory. From 1839, the Navrathri Festival was no longer held in the palace, which contributed to its further decline.

In 1935, with support from the Travancore royal family, the palace was converted into a museum. When the states of India were reorganised on linguistic lines, and Kanyakumari was transferred to Tamil Nadu, the Palace remained under the ownership and control of the Government of Kerala. The Palace is maintained by the Archaeology Department, Govt of Kerala.

== Construction ==
The palace complex continues to be one of the best examples of traditional Kerala architecture, and some portions of the sprawling complex are also the hallmark of traditional Kerala style architecture.

== Unique rooms ==
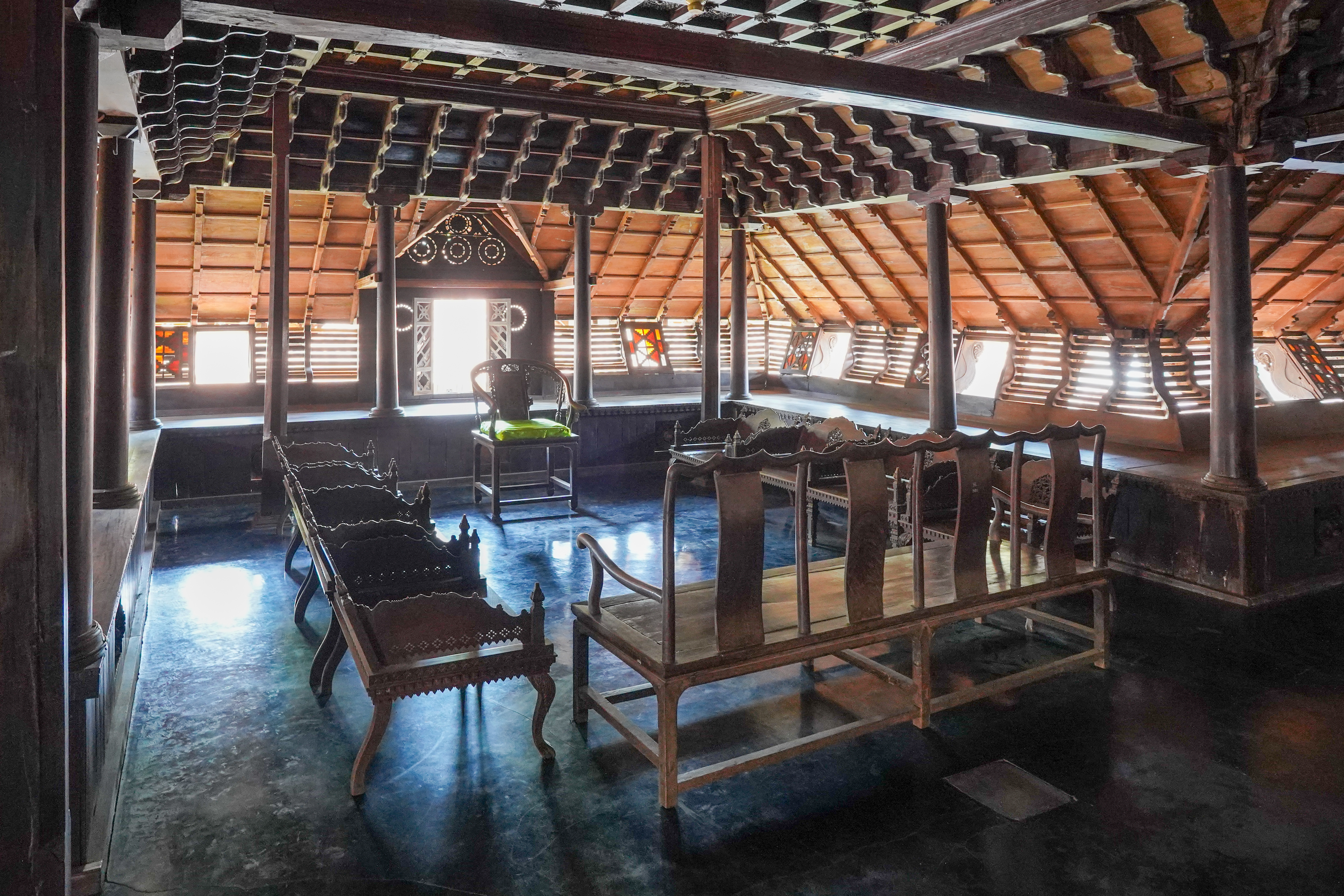
Mantrashala (King's Council Chamber)

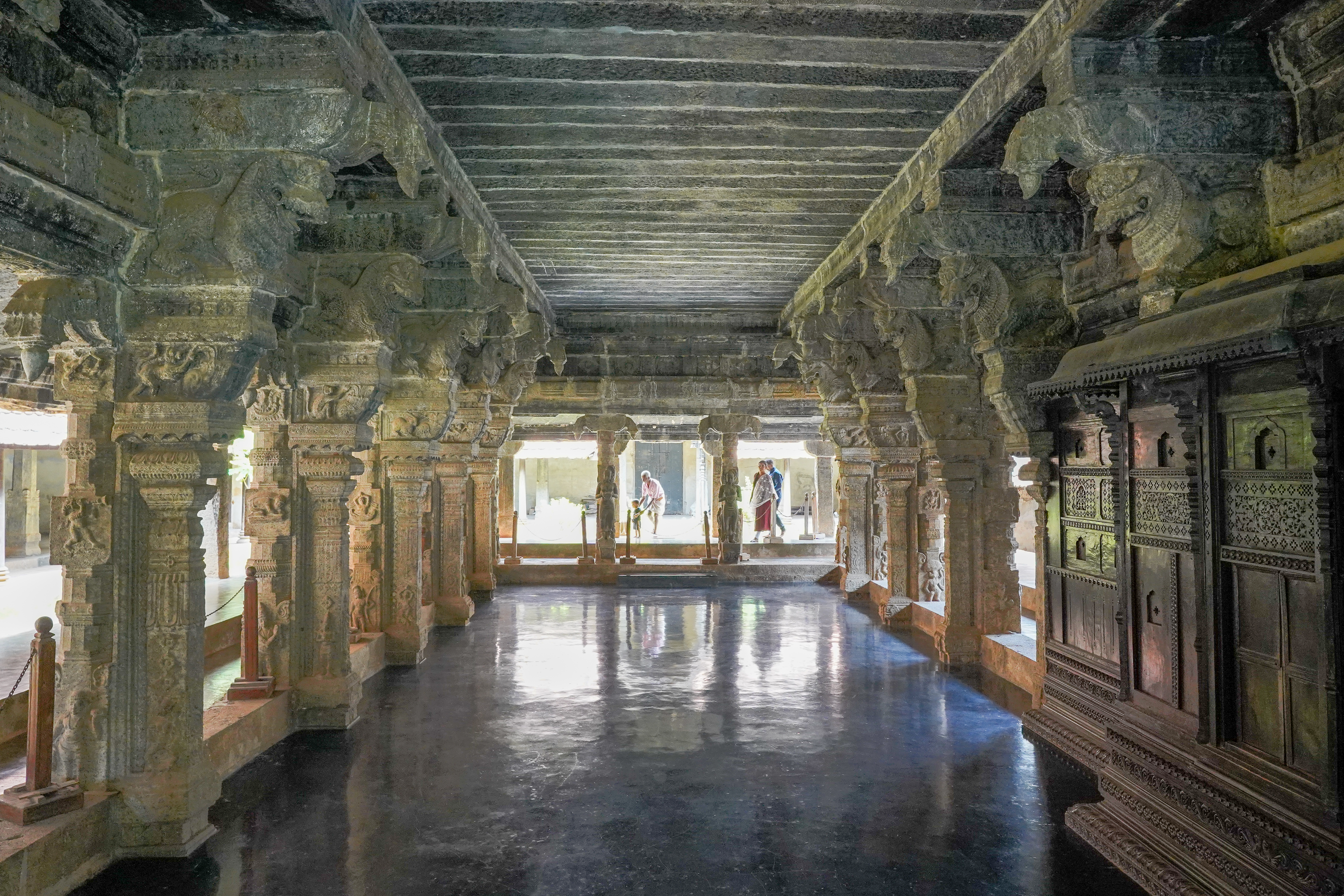
Dance hall, Nataksala

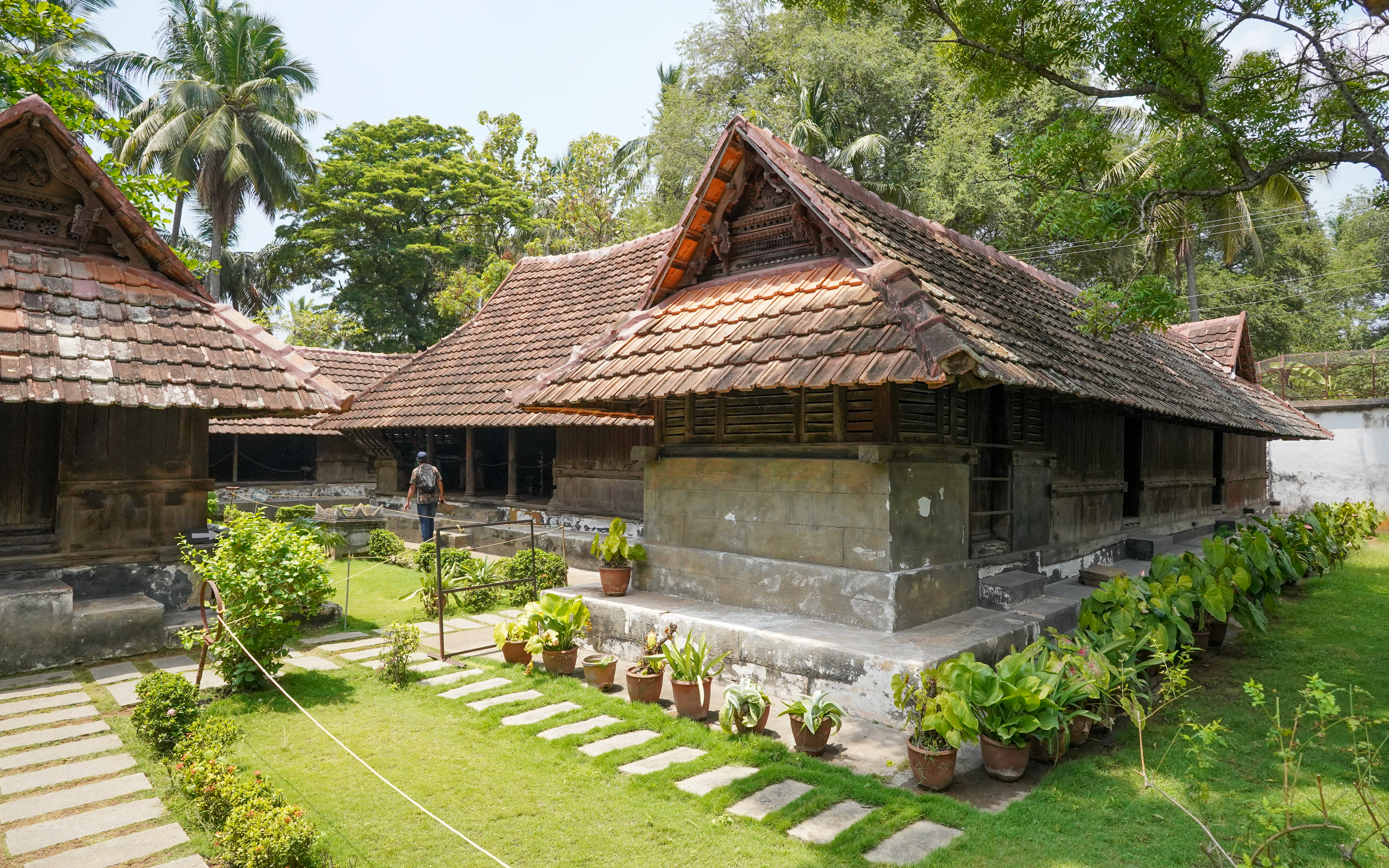
Tekke Kottaram Heritage Museum (formerly Summer Palace)

The Padmanabhapuram Palace complex consists of several structures:

- Mantrashala, the King's Council Chamber
- Thai Kottaram (Malayalam: തായ് കൊട്ടാരം, lit. 'mother's palace'), constructed before 1550
- Nataksala; the Performance Hall
- A four-storeyed mansion at the centre of the complex
- Thekke Kottaram; the Southern Palace
- Indira Vilasom, a guest house built to host guests and foreign dignitaries

=== Central mansion ===
The four-storeyed building is located at the centre of the palace complex. The ground floor houses the royal treasury. The first floor houses the King's bedrooms. The ornamental bedstead is made of 64 types of herbal and medicinal woods, and was a gift from the Dutch merchants. Most of the rooms here and in other parts of the palace complex have built-in recesses in walls for storing weapons like swords and daggers. The second floor houses the King's resting and study rooms. Here the King used to spend time during fasting days. The top floor (called upparikka malika) served as the worship chamber of the royal household. Its walls are covered with exquisite 18th century murals, depicting scenes from the puranas, and also few scenes from the social life of the Travancore of that time. The top floor was supposed to be Sree Padmanabha Swamy's room. This building was constructed during the reign of King Marthandavarma. He was also designated as Padmanabha Dasa and used to rule the Travancore kingdom as a servant of Sree Padmanabha Swamy.

=== Southern Palace ===
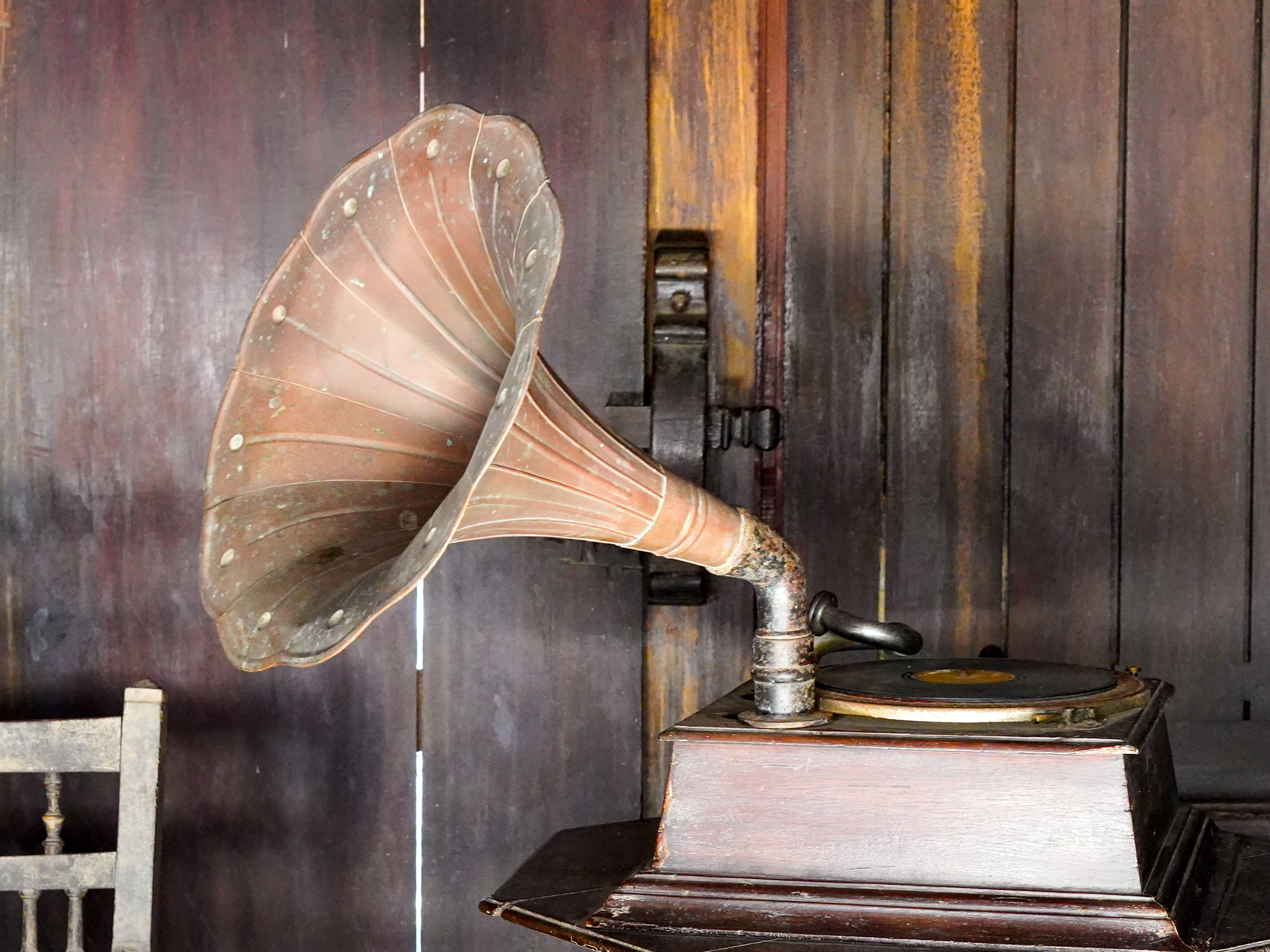
Antique gramophone turntable

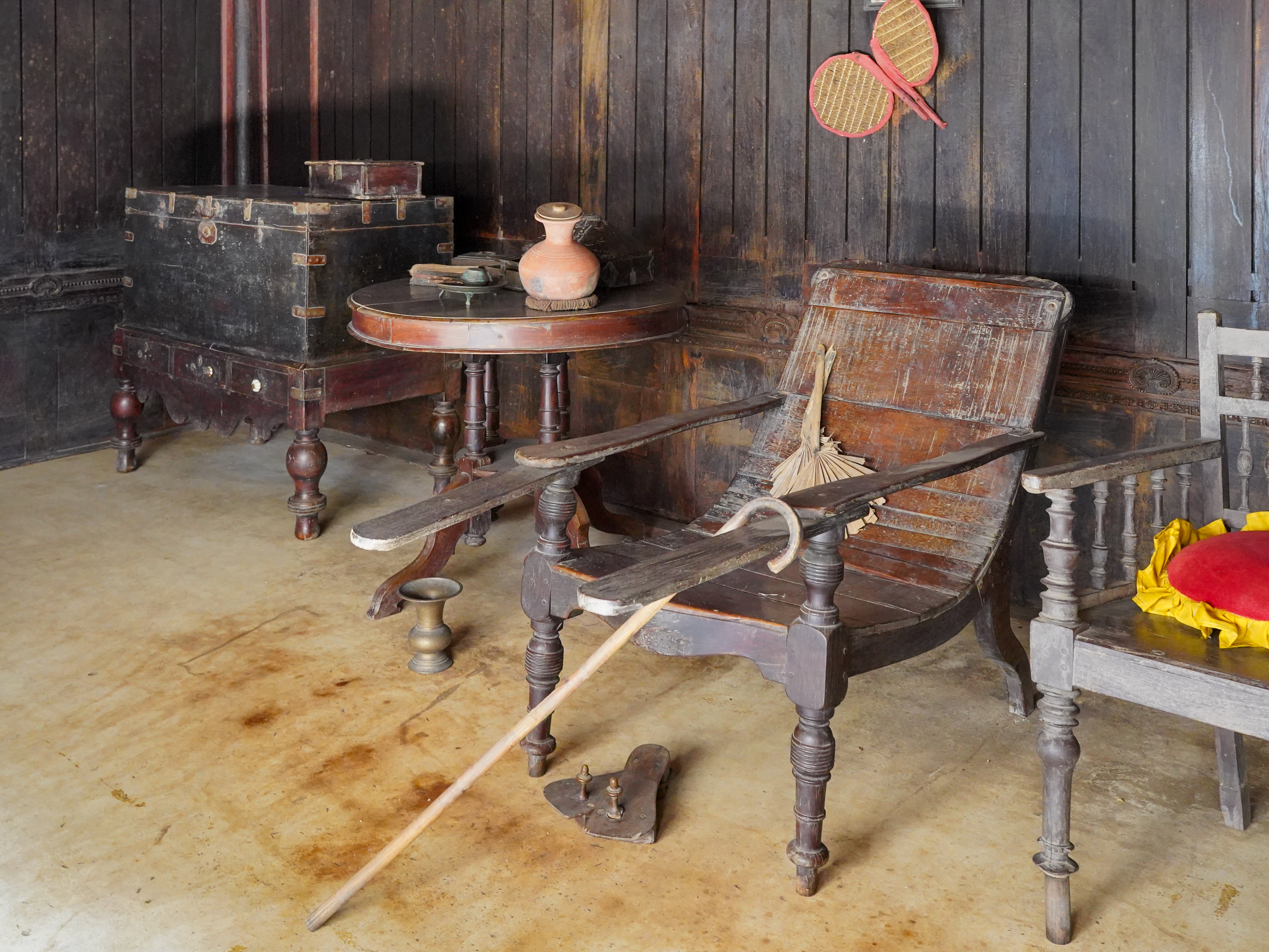
Old household items

The southern palace, known as Thekkae Kottaram or Nirappura, is separated from the palace complex by a public road. This residential complex consists of three buildings. The core residential building is called thai veedu. It faces east, unlike the main palace which faces west. Facing the entrance is thekkath (private worship place). The third building is kulappura (bathing ghat and shelter) near a pond.

In 1993, Thekkae Kottaram was converted into a heritage museum, exhibiting antique household articles and curios. The collection of items give an insight into the social and cultural ethos of the traditional Kerala household in earlier times.

=== Uppirikka Malika ===
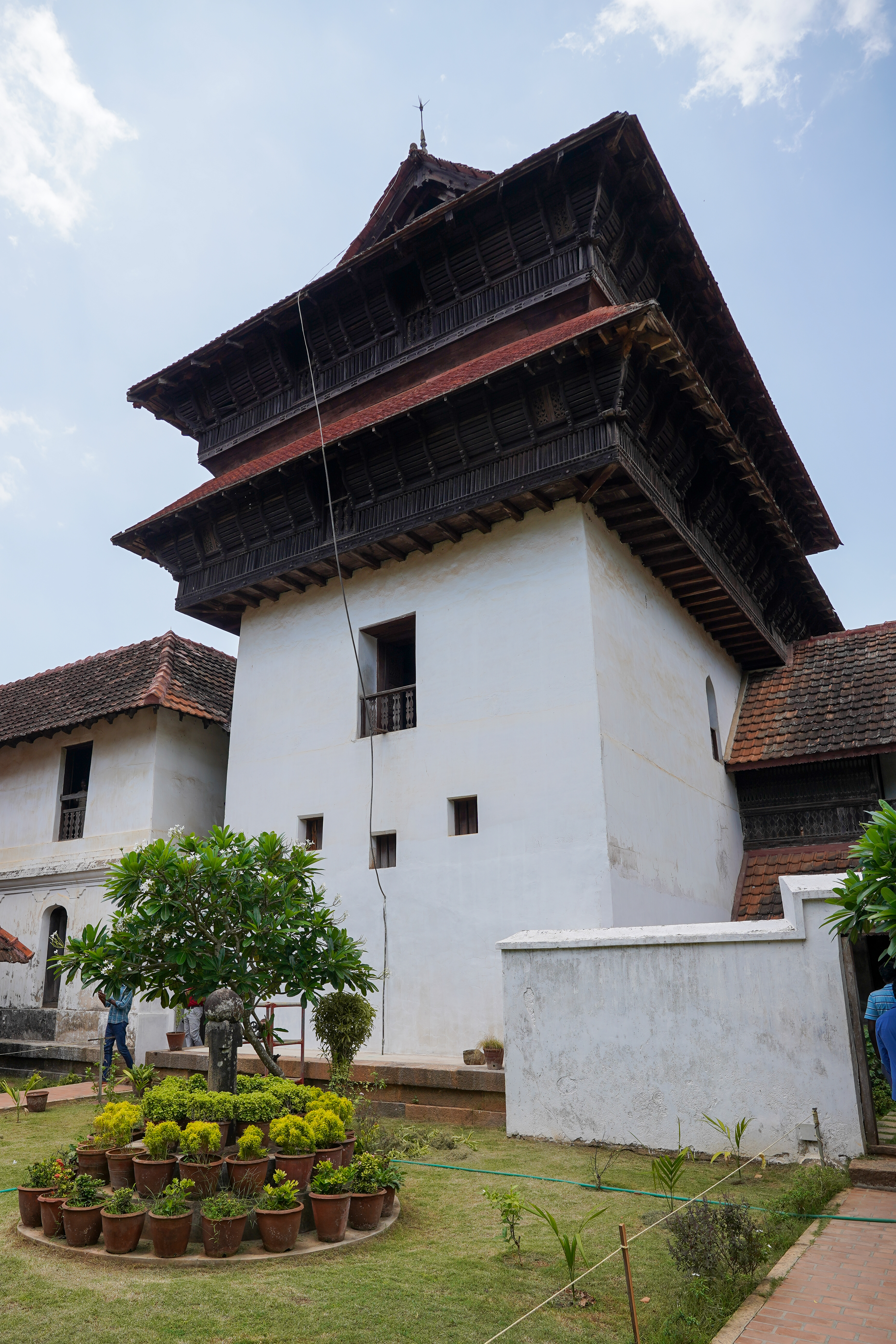
Uppirikka Malika

To the northwest of Thai Kottaram is one of the most notable parts of the royal complex, Uppirikka Malika (Malayalam: ഉപ്പിരിക്ക മാളിക. The complex was built in 1745 by King Anizham Thirunal Marthanda Varma. The ground floor of this building housed the coveted Tranvcore royal treasury. Above this treasury was the king's bedchamber. wherein lies the famous Sapramancha Kattil (Malayalam: സപ്രമഞ്ച കട്ടിൽ). Supposedly, 64 timbers with medicinal properties makes up this grand poster bed. A stair from the King's room leads us to his fasting chambers, where the King resided when he fasted in devotion.

== Other features ==
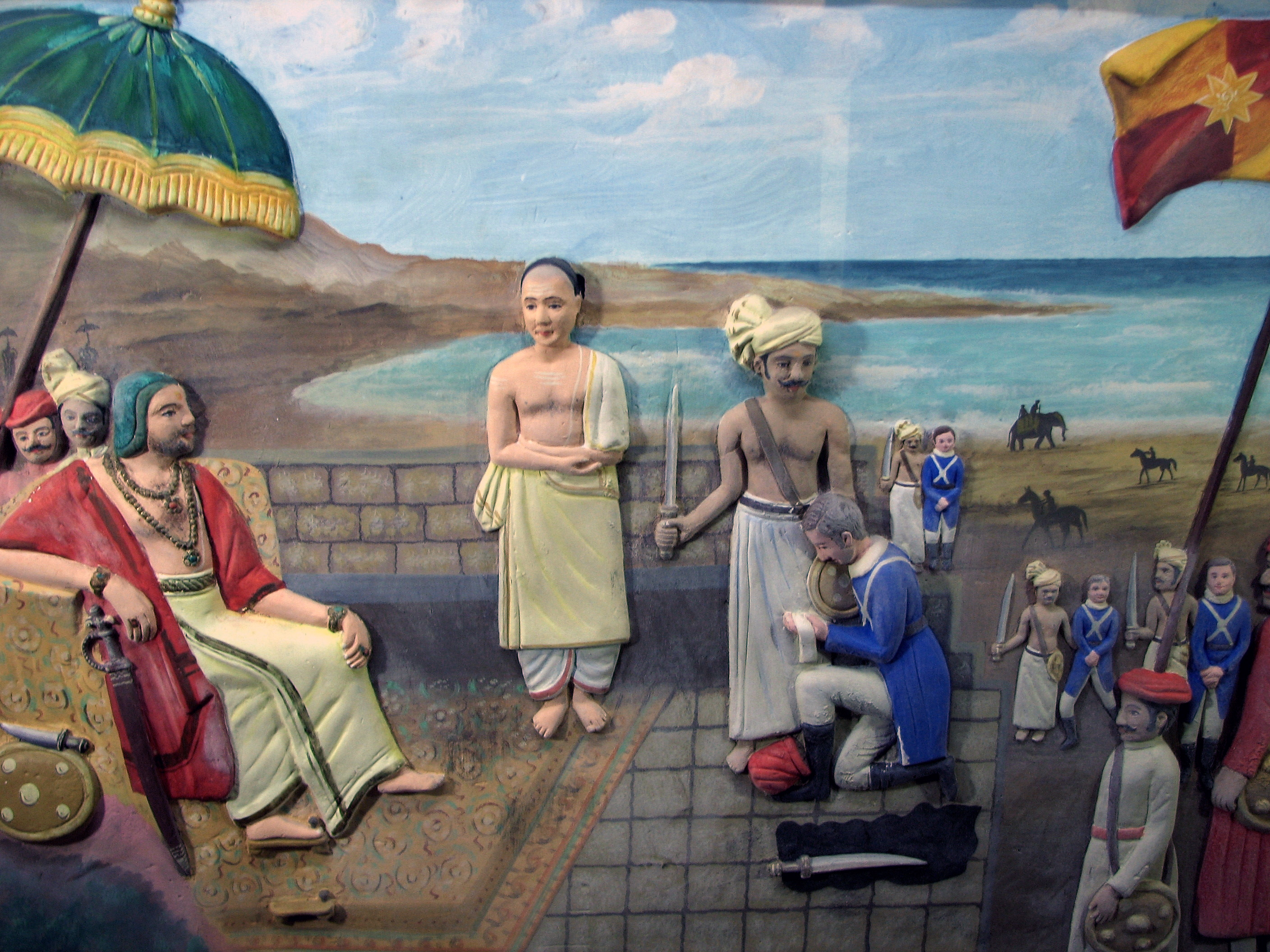
Eustachius De Lannoy, Dutch East India Company surrenders to Maharaja Marthanda Varma, Kingdom of Travancore after the Battle of Colachel

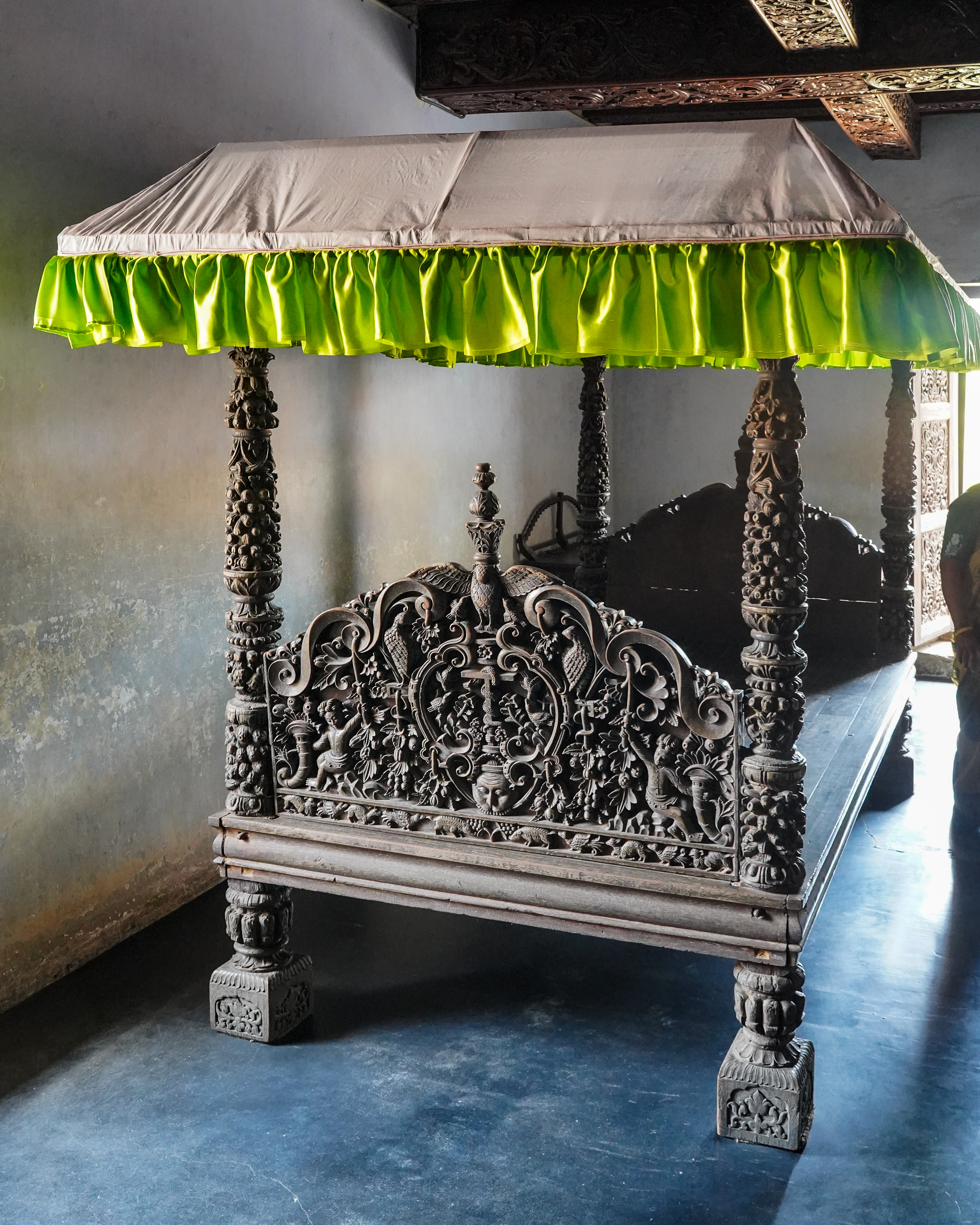
Bed made of 64 types of wood

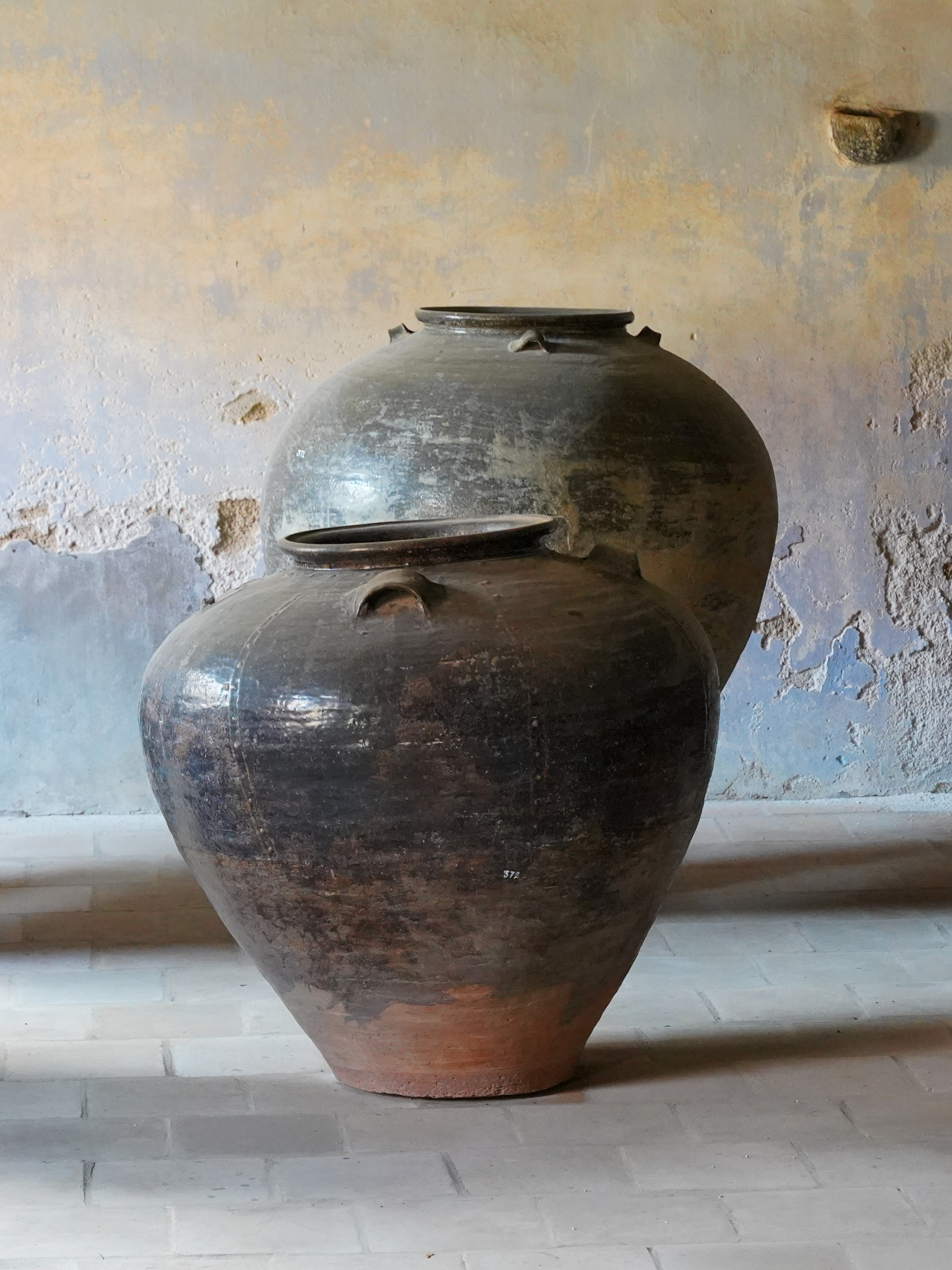
Chinese pickle jars

The Padamnabhapuram Palace complex has several other interesting features:

- The palace is located near Thuckalay, Kanyakumari district of Tamil Nadu state but administered by the Government of Kerala state.
- The clock tower in the palace complex has a 300-year-old clock, which still keeps time.
- A big hall now bare, which can accommodate around 1000 guests, and where ceremonial feasts were held, on auspicious occasions.
- A secret passage, now blocked, through which the king, his immediate family members, and their entourage could escape to another palace, located several kilometers away in the event of any emergency. Name of this palace is Charottu Kottaram.
- A flight of steps leads to a bathing pond, which has lost its freshness due to neglect and years of disuse.
- The palace complex also has a section of curios and several interesting objects:
  - An entire room filled with old Chinese jars, all gifts by Chinese merchants.
  - A variety of weapons (which were actually used in warfare), including swords and daggers.
  - Brass lamps, wood and stone sculpture, a variety of furniture and large mirrors made of polished metal.
  - A gallery of paintings depicting incidents from the history of Travancore.
  - A wooden cot made of up to 64 wooden pieces of a variety of medicinal tree trunks
  - Polished stone cot, meant for cool effect
  - Toilet and well

== Gallery ==
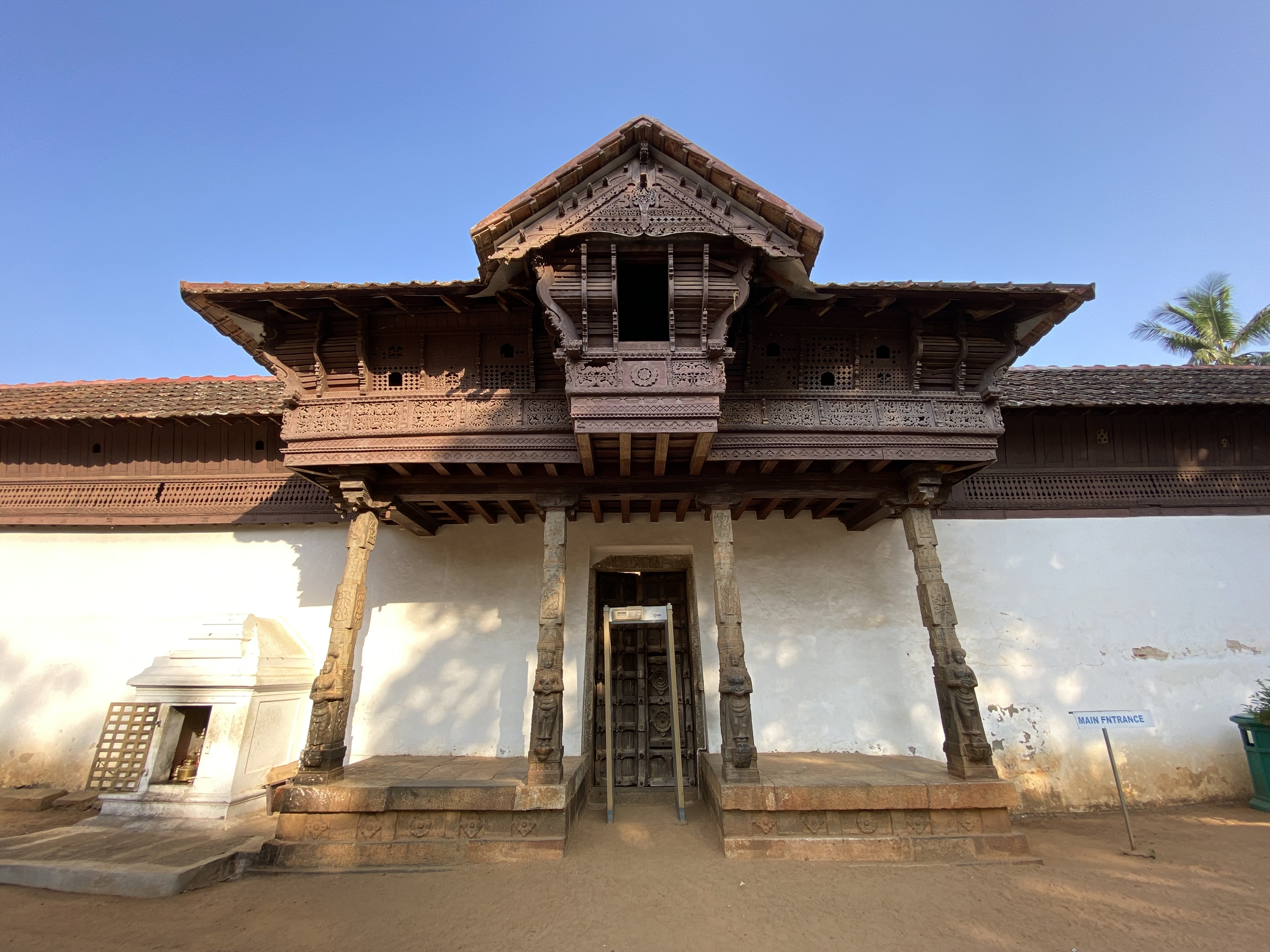
Padmanabhapuram Palace exterior facade

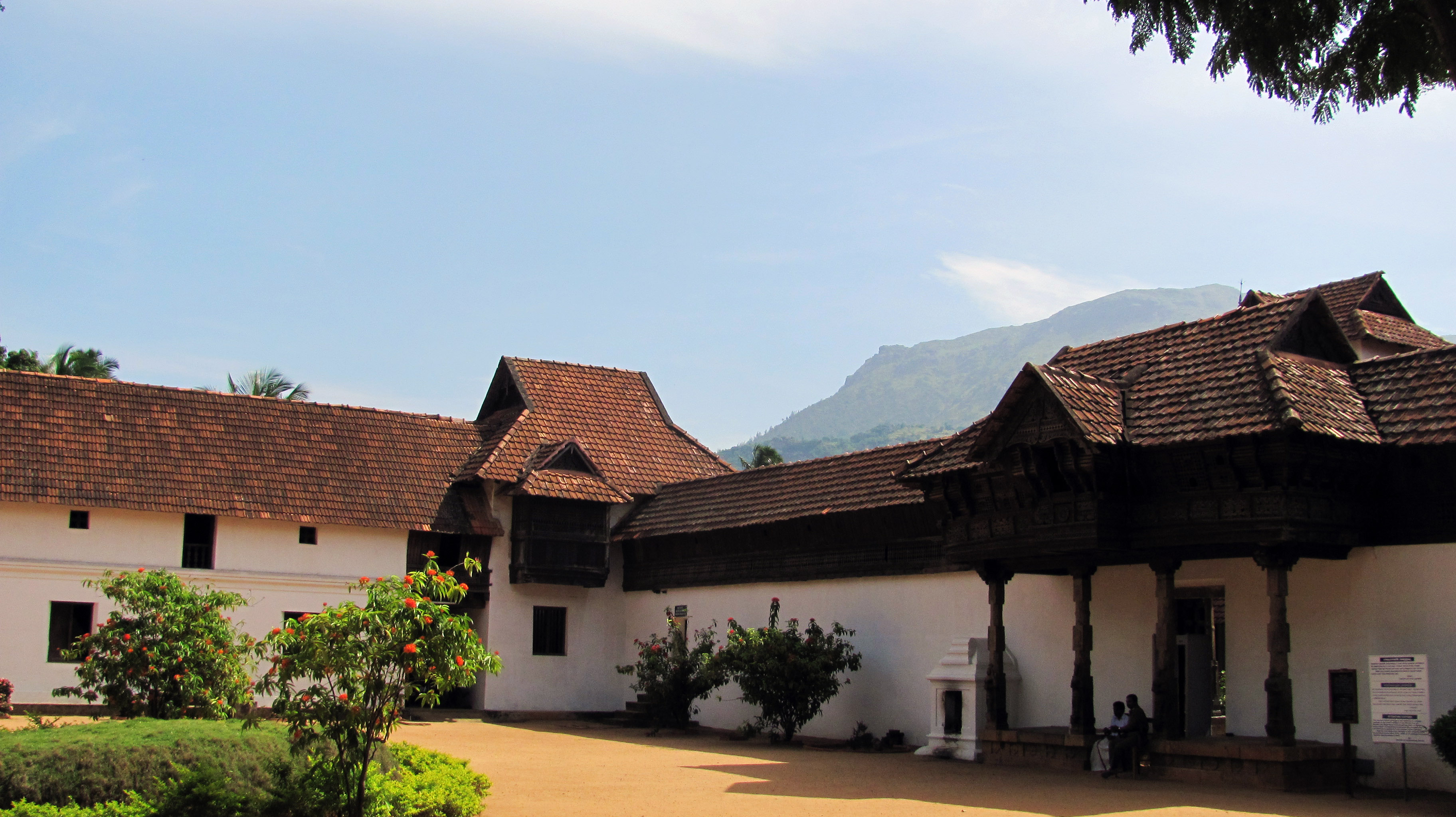
Padmanabhapuram Palace (Side View)

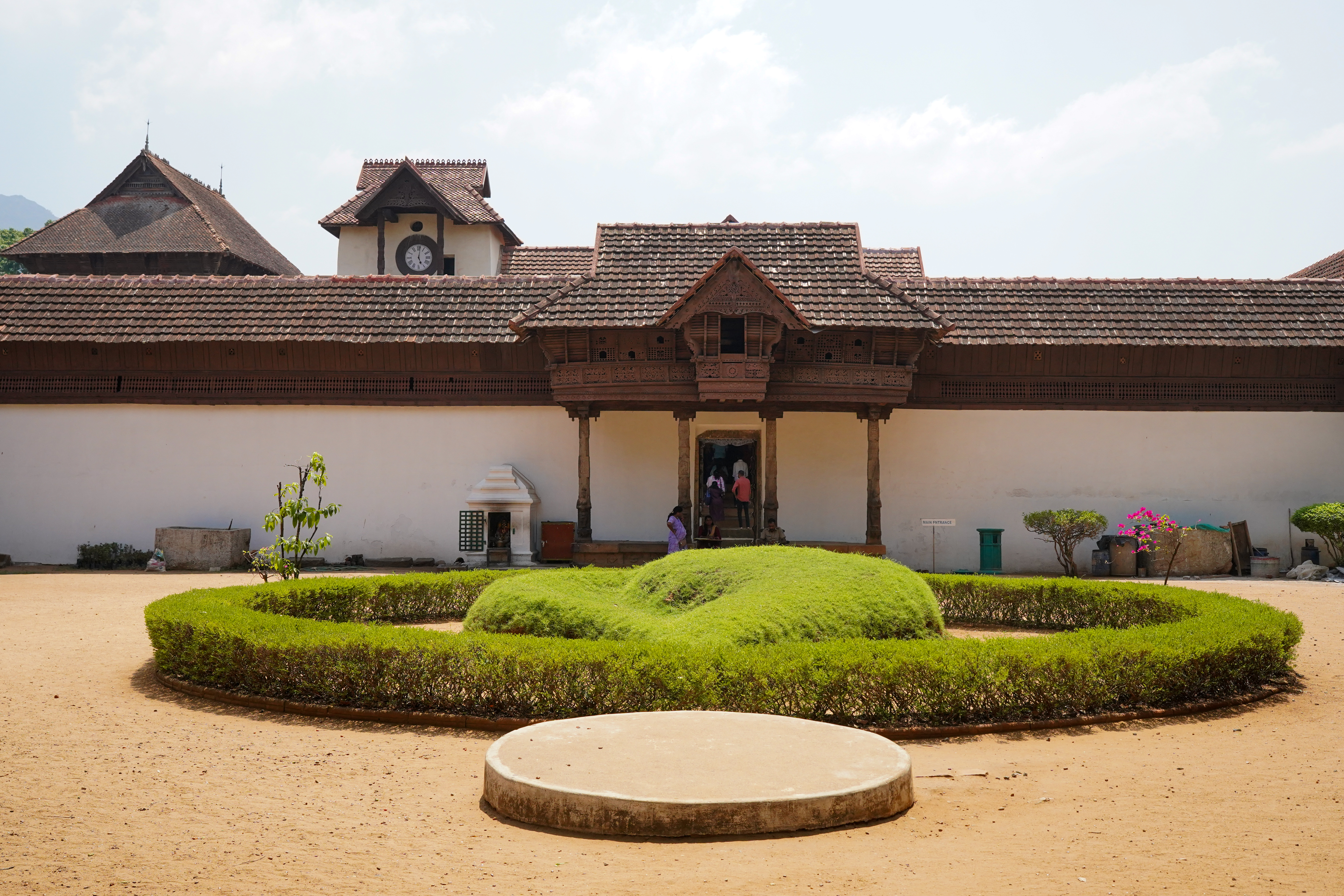
Padmanabhapuram Palace forecourt

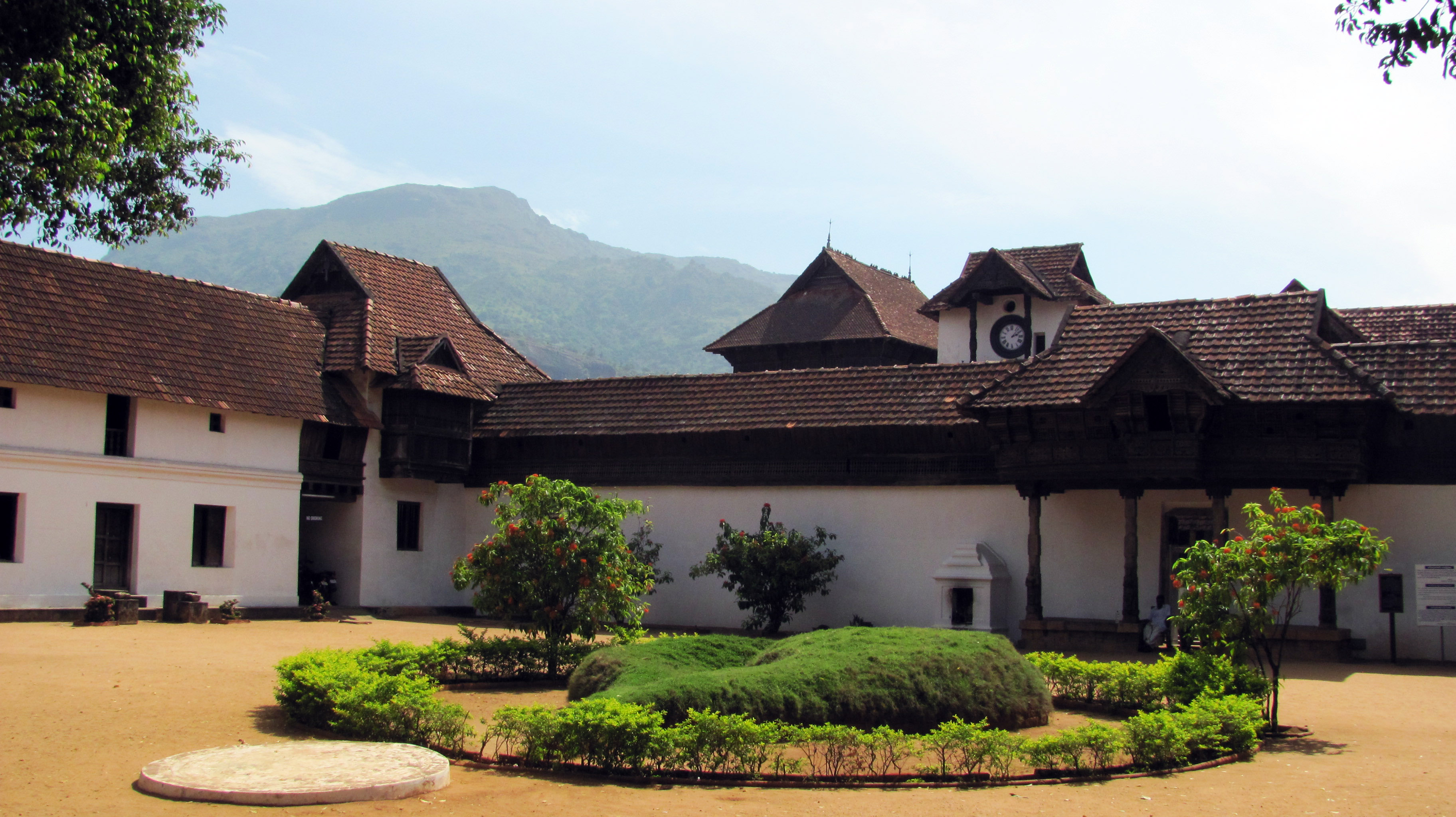
Padmanabhapuram Palace

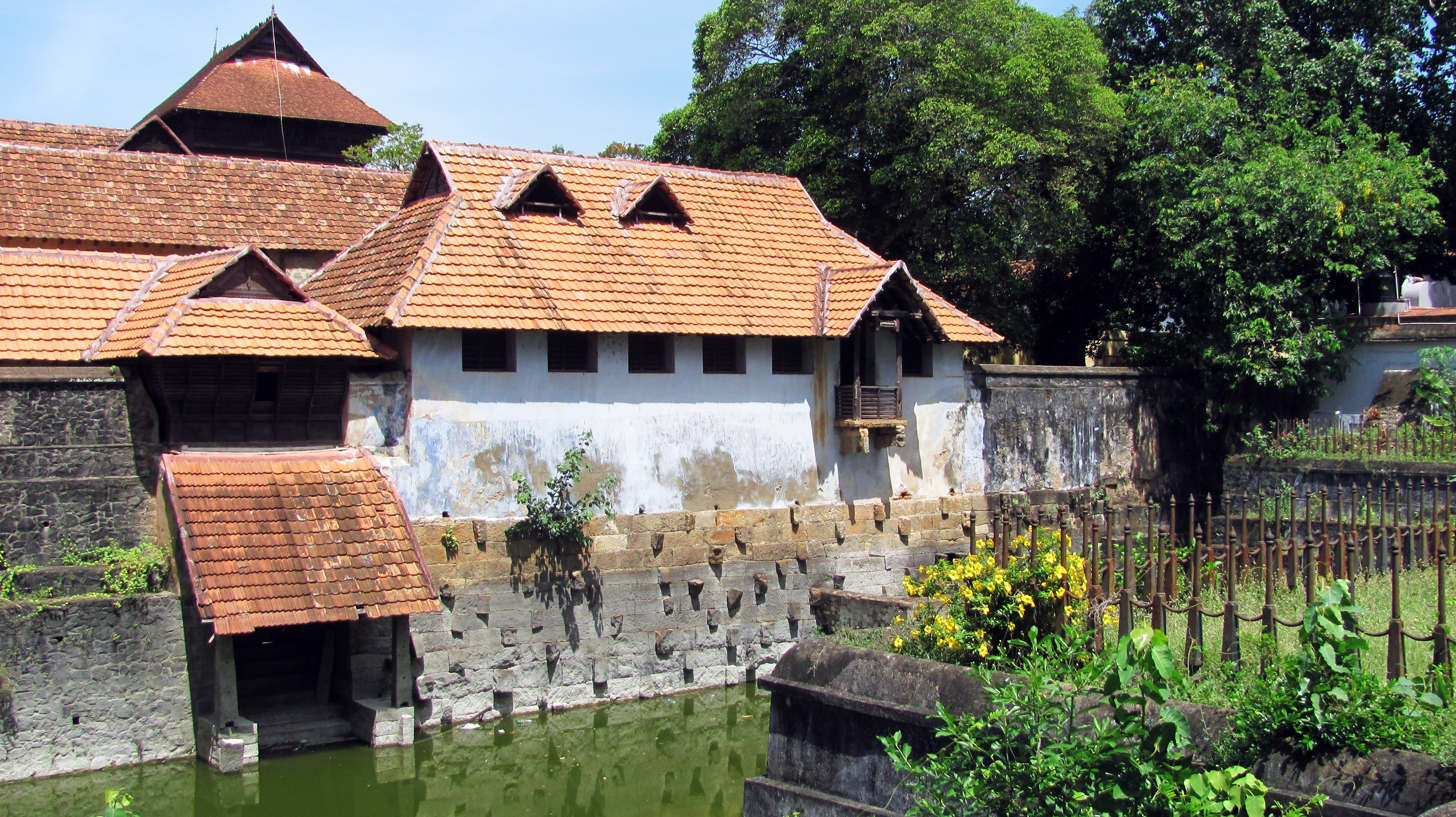
Padmanabhapuram Palace and Pond

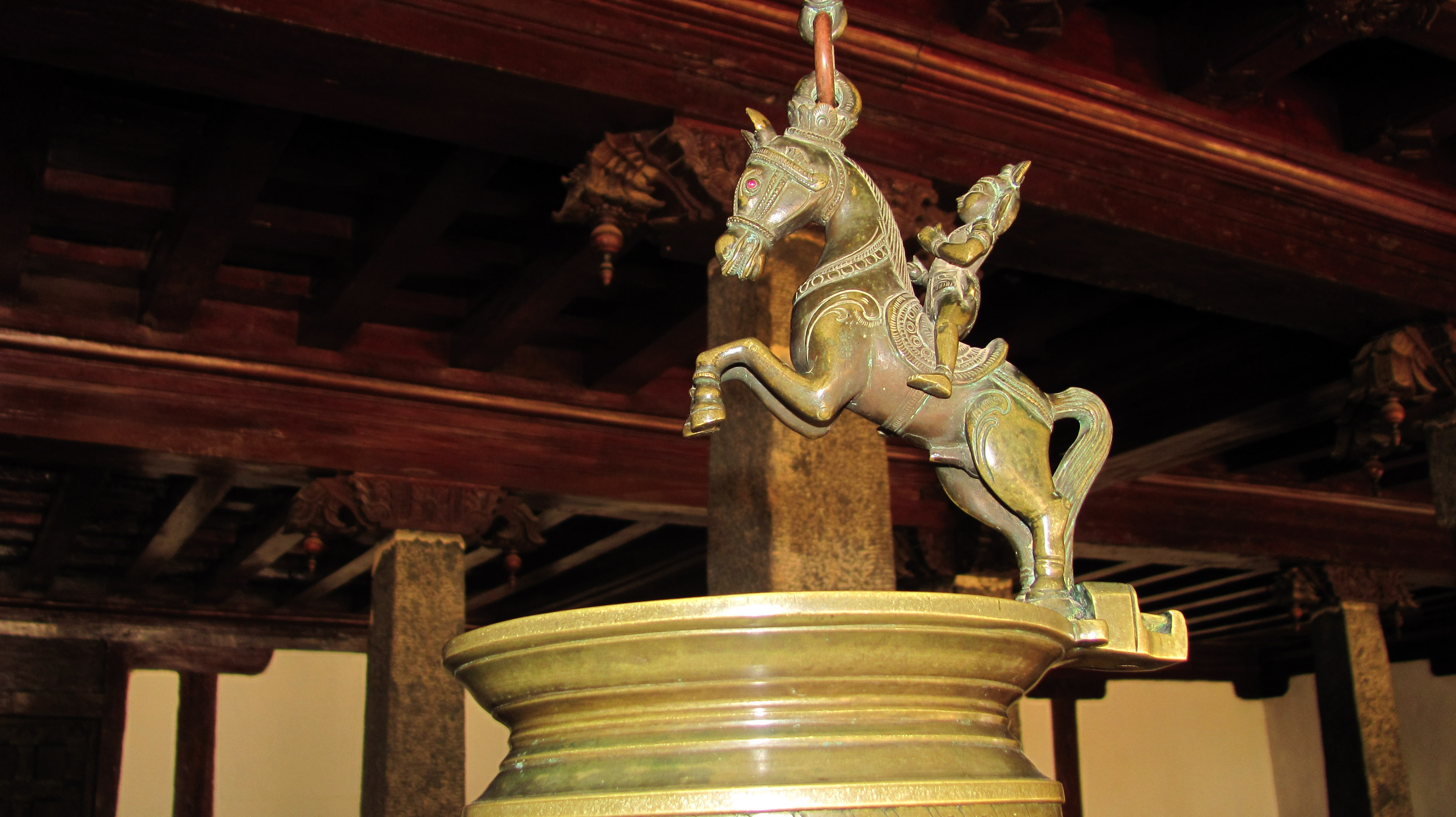
Kuthira Vilakku

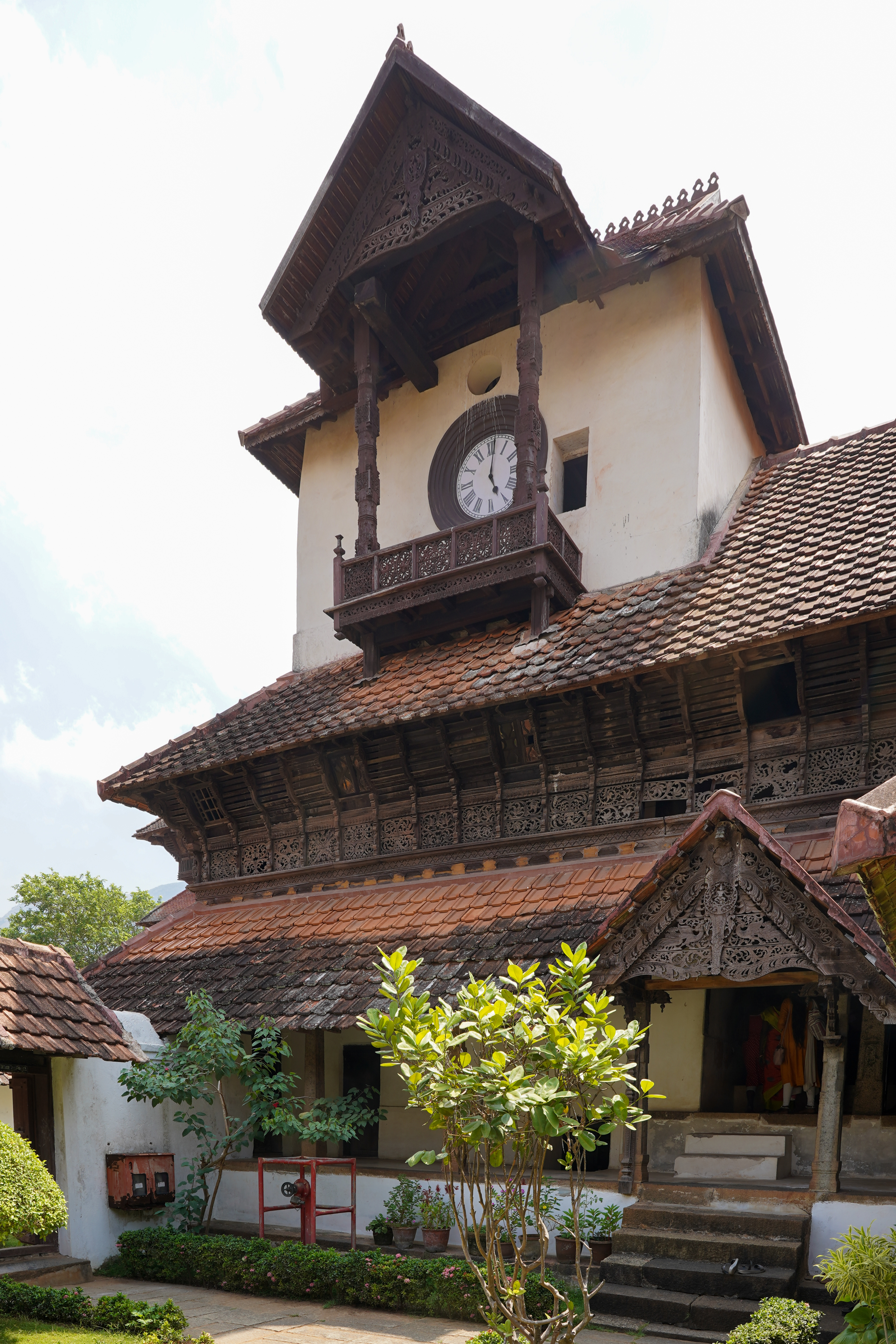
Clock tower

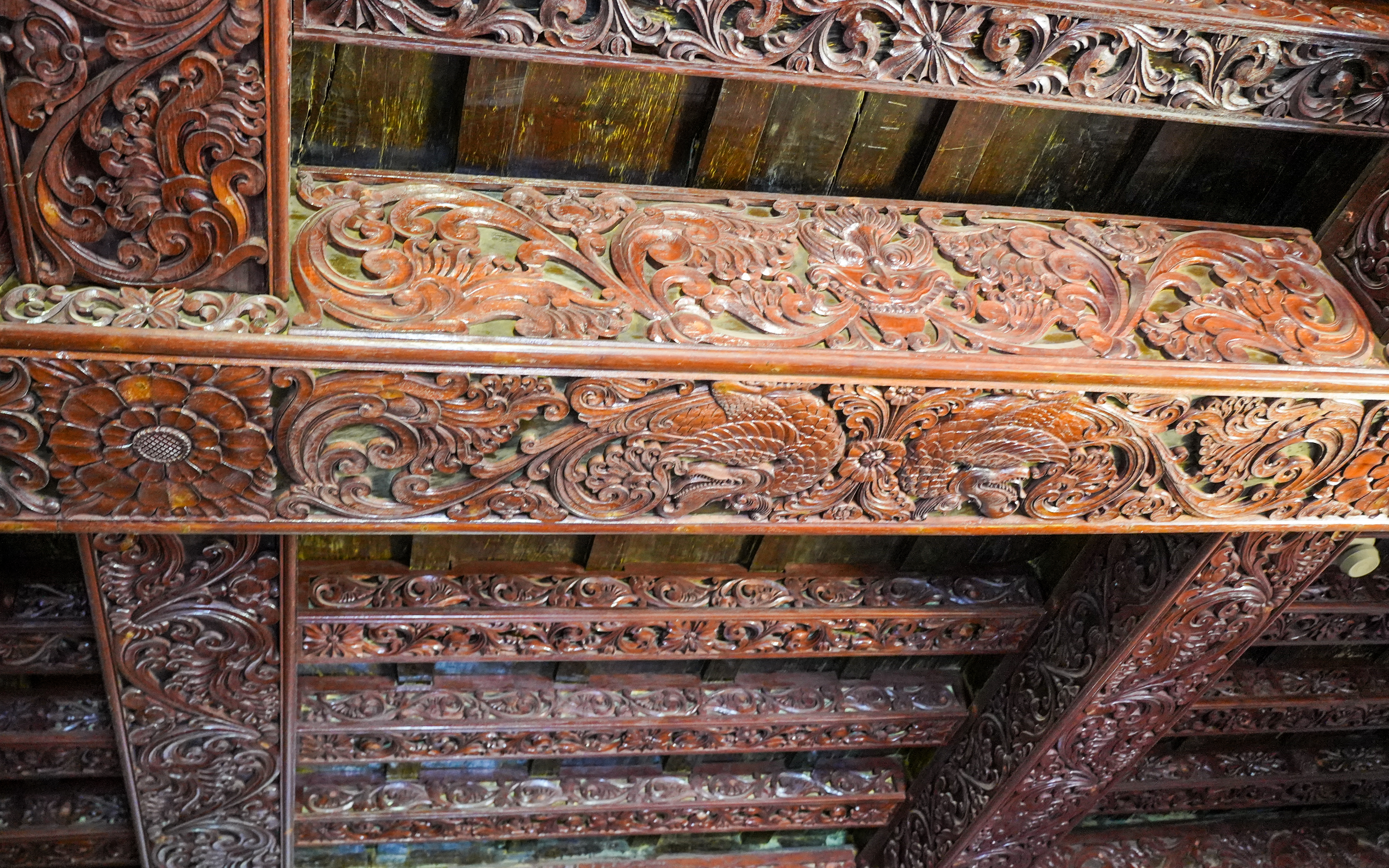
Engraved wooden ceiling, Uppirikka Malika

== See also ==
- Kuttalam Palace
- List of State Protected Monuments in Kerala
- Tentative List of World Heritage Sites in India
- Eraniel
- Marthandavarma (Novel)
- Manichitrathazhu (Movie)
