= Moolachel =

Moolachel or Moolachal Moolachy
- village
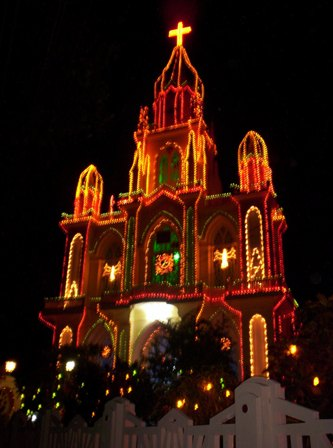
- Moolachel Church, Christmas of 2004
- Country: India
- State: Tamil Nadu
- District: Kanniyakumari

Languages
  - Official: Tamil
- Time zone: UTC+5:30 (IST)
- PIN: 629175,629166
- Telephone code: 04651
- Vehicle registration: TN-75

Moolachel, or Moolachy, is a village in the Kanniyakumari district on the southern tip of India in the state of Tamil Nadu. It is located near Padmanabhapuram Palace, with a few nearby town centres: Thuckalay, Marthandam, and Nagercoil.

The population is primarily employed in agriculture.

Moolachel is home to CSI Hacker Memorial Church (formerly Hacker Memorial Methodist Church, Moolachy) whose tower (steeple) has been erected by the generous donations of the patron Esquire Richard Facey Hunter (R.F.H.) Crowther in memory of his mother Louisa A. I. A. Crowther, née Hunter. The village also runs a creche and a matriculation school, though people of many religions live there. A government high school and TNEB SubStation/Office are also found in Moolachel.

A channel runs across the village with a 1.5-meter-wide gate to drain water at Kollankonam during the flood season.

The people of Moolachel are famous for making agricultural products such as bananas, coconuts, Ayurvedic medicine plants, vegetables, rubber, pepper and (in ancient years) karrupukatti.

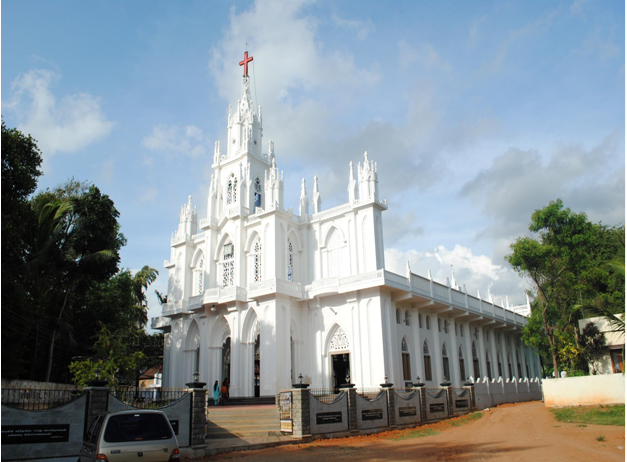
CSI Hacker Memorial Church after completion of extensions and renovations.
