= Ponnaiyah Ramajayam Institute of Science and Technology =

University in Vallam Thanjavur, India

Ponnaiyah Ramajayam Institute of Science and Technology (PRIST)
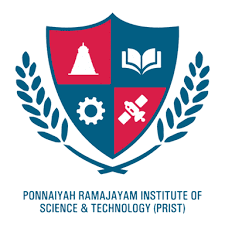
- Other names: PRIST, PRIST University, PRIST Deemed University
- Motto: Quality and Discipline
- Type: Private, Deemed to be University
- Established: 1985
- Founder: Dr. P. Murugeshan
- Accreditation: NAAC ‘A’ Grade
- Affiliations: UGC, MHRD, AICTE, NAAC, NCTE, BCI
- Chancellor: Prof. M. Ponnaiyah Nageshwaran
- Vice-Chancellor: Dr. T. V. Christy
- Location: Thanjavur, Tamil Nadu, India
- Campus: 95 acres; Rural
- Website: www.prist.ac.in

Ponnaiyah Ramajayam Institute of Science and Technology (PRIST), also known as PRIST University, is a Private Deemed University recognized under Section 3 of the UGC Act 1956, located in Vallam, Thanjavur, India. The institute offers undergraduate and postgraduate courses in Engineering, Science, Education, Management, Arts and Law, as well as research programmes.

== History ==
The institute was founded in 1985 by Prof. P. Murugesan. It was initially known as the Institute of Computer Science and Technology. Murugesan founded the institute to introduce computer education to the Thanjavur District. Soon thereafter, the institute received affiliation from Bharathidasan University to offer postgraduate diploma programmes in computer applications.

Thereafter it expanded to include an Arts and Science College, College of Engineering and Technology, College of Education, Research Institution and Polytechnic College.

In 2004 Ponnaiyah Ramajayam College applied for NAAC assessment and accreditation and was awarded an "A" grade, thus making it the first "A" grade awarded college in the Bharathidasan University area. The college then submitted its proposal to the Ministry of Human Resource Development, Government of India for deemed university status.

On 4 January 2008 the institute was conferred deemed university status based on the recommendations of the UGC Expert Committee, the Ministry of HRD and the Government of India. The institute also received approval from the Distance Education Council (DEC) and its B.Ed. course is approved by The National Council for Teacher Education (NCTE).

Currently, the institute offers degrees in medicine, engineering, arts & science, education, law, pharmacy, management and technology, as well as Ph.D. programmes in some of these fields.

== Admission ==
Admission to the Institute for Engineering courses is based on student performance on the All-India Engineering Entrance Examination. For other courses, admission is based on performance in previous relevant academic courses. To be eligible for admission, students need to pass 10 for diploma courses and 10+2 examination with physics and mathematics as compulsory subjects, along with one of either chemistry, biotechnology, biology, or a technical vocational subject. Students are required to score at least 45% (or 40% for candidates belonging to the reserved category) in the above subjects taken together.

== Campuses ==
=== Thanjavur West ===
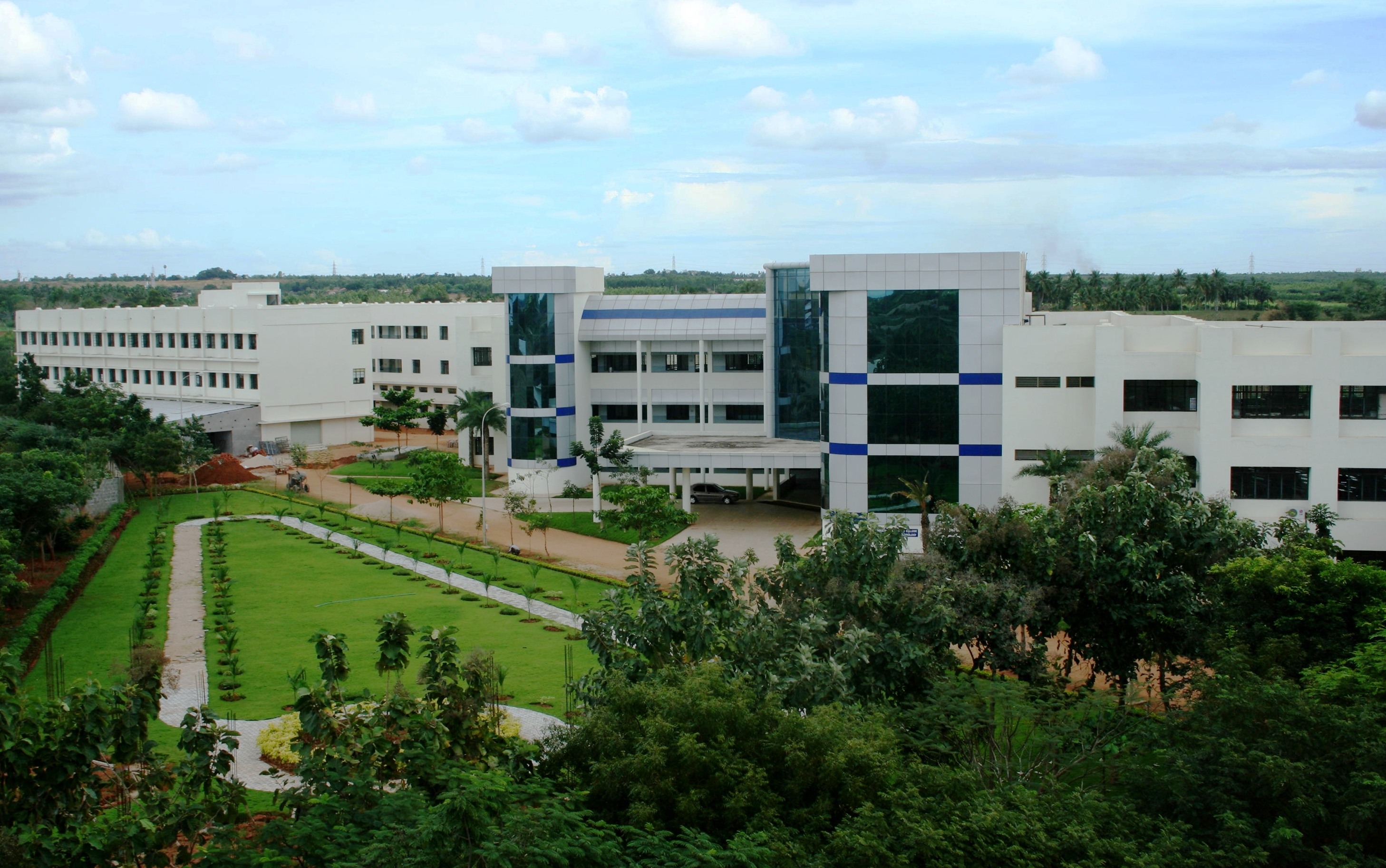
PRIST Main campus

The Thanjavur West Campus is the main campus. It covers more than 47 acres of land. It houses a population of over 5,000 students with 20 blocks and two boys' hostels.

=== Thanjavur East ===
The Thanjavur East Campus is located approximately 15 km east of the main campus. It contains several blocks for undergraduate and postgraduate level courses in the fields of science, humanities, pharmacy and management, as well as a girls' hostel that houses over 1000 students. It contains a well-stocked library and many indoor and outdoor sports facilities.

== Student activities ==
=== Clubs ===
- PRIST Cyber Tech Club – One of the oldest clubs, which organises events, lectures, presentation and workshops on recent trends, developments and emerging technologies in the field of Computer Science.
- Shakespeare Club
- C. V. Raman Club
- PRIST Micro-Biology Club
- PRIST Bio-Chemistry Club
- PRIST Bio Clout Club
- PRIST Nature Club
- PRIST Green Cell
- Ramanujan Mathematics Club

=== Associations ===
- PRIST Athletic Association
- PRIST Chemistry Association
- Milton English Literary Association
- PRIST Fine Arts Association
- Amateur Marketing Managers Association

=== Festivals ===
- Food Fest – An annual one-day food festival organised by the institute with a focus on South Indian foods.
- PRIST Kamban Kazhagam

=== Technical certifications ===
- Database course from Oracle Corporation (OCA) – This course is available to all students studying circuit branches, and is mandatory for students studying for a B.Tech. in Computer Science. It is created in partnership with Oracle University with certified faculties and course material supplied by Oracle.
- Networking course from Cisco Systems (CCNA) – 2nd year Engineering students of circuit branches are required to study this course, created in partnership with Cisco System to provide course materials and training certifications to students and faculty staff.
- SAP Partner (for undergraduate and postgraduate students)
- SolidWorks
- CATIA
- Matlab
- GRE/GMAT/GATE – Up-to-date preparation kits are available at the library for students who is seeking higher studies in India and abroad.
