= Thakkalai =

Town in Tamil Nadu, India

Thuckalay
- Town
- Interactive map of Thuckalay
- Coordinates: 8°14′45″N 77°18′56″E
- Country: India
- State: Tamil Nadu
- District: Kanyakumari

Languages
  - Official: Tamil
  - Spoken: Tamil, Malayalam
- Time zone: UTC+5:30 (IST)
- PIN: 629175
- Telephone code: 04651
- Vehicle registration: TN-75, TN-74
- Nearest city: Nagercoil
- Lok Sabha constituency: Kanniyakumari
- Vidhan Sabha constituency: Padmanabhapuram

Thuckalay or Thakkalai is a town in Kanyakumari district of Tamil Nadu, India. Thuckalay comes under the Padmanabhapuram Municipality, and is the administrative headquarters of Kalkulam Taluk. The Revenue Divisional Office is located in Mettukadai.

The nearest railway station is located in Eraniel, which is approximately 5 km from Thuckalay. The nearest Airport is Thiruvananthapuram International Airport (TRV), which is (51 km) from Thuckalay.

Thuckalay is one of the major towns, among Kuzhithurai, Marthandam, and Nagercoil which are on the national highway that connects Thiruvananthapuram, Kerala and Kanyakumari.

Thuckalay is (17 km) from Nagercoil. Nagercoil is the headquarters for Kanyakumari District. And (34 km) from Kanyakumari also known as Cape Comorin.

Thuckalay bus stand is the commercial centre of Thuckalay, where restaurants, bakeries, and retail stores are located. Mettukadai, Manali, Old Bus Stand, Kumaracoil.

Thuckalay bus terminal has government-run buses, and private mini buses connecting to all the places in Kanyakumari District. It also has buses connecting Thiruvananthapuram, Madurai, Tirunelveli, Ooty, Trichy, and Chennai.

The Private Omnibuses stop either at the post office near old busstand or opposite to Police station in front of L.V. Press. There are daily private omnibuses to Chennai, Bangalore, Coimbatore, and Hyderabad.

Thuckalay is famous for Noorul Islam Centre for Higher Education, which is situated in Villavor panchayat, Padmanabhapuram Palace, Vattakottai, APMA and makkaipalayam jumma Masjid, Murugan temple of Kumarakoil, and Saint Eliyasiar holy church.

Thuckalay is a hub for travellers around the region as it is on the National Highway and connects all over the district, Tamil Nadu state, Kerala state, and other southern states.

== History ==
Thuckalay is a part of Padmanabhapuram, which was once the capital of the historic Indian state of Travancore. Thuckalay is a small town that grew due to the location of the bus stand, public library, Jail, Court, and the national highway going through it.

== Education ==
The Thuckalay Government Higher Secondary School is the largest Government Educational institution in the region. There are also institutions such as the Amala Convent, which is run by a local church and an international school. The Salvation Army Nursery and primary school and Tucker Girls Hostel, which is run by an International Christian Charity Organisation "The Salvation Army".

== Religious ==
- Churches:

CSI Church, The Salvation Army Church, St. Eliyas Church, Horeb Panavilai CSI Church, St Antony's Church, Manali and Full Gospel Pentecostal Church.

- Temples:

Sivan Temple, Nagaraja Temple, Perumal Temple, Mutharamman temple Devi Temple and other community temples

- Mosques:

Masjid Makkai Palayam, APMA Jumma Masjid.

== Health services ==
Kanyakumari district's headquarters hospital is located near Mettukada. There are also privately run hospitals and clinics.

== Tourism ==
The Padmanabhapuram Palace is located 1 km from Thuckalay. The palace is built in the Travancore architectural style, containing 17th and 18th-century murals and underground passages.

The Dutch commander Eustachius De Lannoy was buried in the nearby Udayagiri Fort, situated near the Padmanabhapuram palace. It is built of massive granite blocks around an isolated hillock, 260 feet (79 m) high enclosing an area of almost 90 acres (360,000 m^{2}). The original fort was said to have been destroyed by Raja Raja Chola. The fort was rebuilt in 1741-1744 during the reign of Marthanda Varma, under the supervision of De Lannoy, a Belgian General who served as the chief of the Travancore Army for 37 years. He died on 1 June 1777 at the age of 62 and was buried within the fort. His tomb is marked out by a stone cross with inscriptions in both Latin and Tamil.

=== Peerappa Dargha ===
There is a shrine "Peer Mohamed Oliyullah Dargha" at Thuckalay named in honour of the philosopher and Tamil poet Peer Mohamed Appa, born in Tenkasi in the Tirunelveli District. After spending some time in spiritual pursuits in Peermedu of Kerala State, he came to live at Thuckalay. He was an intimate of the Kings of the Chera dynasty, and it is said that he laid the foundation stone for the Padmanabhapuram Granite Fort.

His birthday is celebrated every year on a grand scale on the full moon day in the Arabic month of Rajab. Both the people of Kerala and Tamil Nadu attend the celebrations on large numbers irrespective of their caste, creed and religion. The Tamil Nadu government declared a one-day local holiday for the function.

=== Kumara Kovil ===
Located 3 km away from Thuckalay, Kumarakovil is the site of the Murugan temple dedicated to the Hindu god Murugan where daily rituals and regular festivals take place.
