= Shri B. M. Patil Medical College =

Medical school in Karnataka, India

- Motto: "Work is Worship"
- Type: Private
- Established: 1986
- Academic affiliations: BLDE (Deemed to be University)
- Dean: Dr. Tejaswini Vallabha
- Academic staff: 300
- Administrative staff: 1500
- Undergraduates: 150
- Postgraduates: 79
- Location: Vijaypura, Karnataka, India
- Website: bldedu.ac.in

Shri B. M. Patil Medical College is situated at Solapur road in Bijapur, Karnataka. It was declared a university under Section 3 of the UGC Act 1956, and approved by the Ministry of Human Resource Development. The college offers educational courses in medicine and surgery leading to MBBS degree. The college was established in the year 1986. The college has a well equipped hospital attached to it.

== Research ==
Research is carried out through national and international funded projects. Depression Brain Bank is in function. The medical college is having Centre for Advanced Medical Research, Laboratory of Vascular Physiology and Medicine, Genetics Laboratory and Centre for Yoga and Exercise Sciences. These centers and laboratory provides all the research facilities from basic medical sciences to clinical medicine. It runs several clinical trials with Indian and International collaborations. Parent University of the medical college - BLDE (Deemed to be University) offers PhD curriculum under Faculty of Medicine and Faculty of Allied Health Sciences.

== Library and information centre ==
The Central Library is spread over 2 acres (0.81 ha).

== Undergraduate courses ==
The college offers the four-and-a-half-year M.B.B.S. course with a one-year compulsory rotating internship.

== Postgraduate courses ==
The college offers both the postgraduate degree and diploma courses. The degree course is of three years duration whereas the diploma course is of two years.

== Body Donation Association ==
The main purpose of this association is to receive the donor's bodies for corneal transplantation to the blind, research purposes, study of organs by the undergraduate, post-graduate and research students. A regular yearly campaign is organized in the city to create awareness for the same.

== Sports ==
The college has grounds and facilities for cricket, football, table tennis, volleyball, lawn tennis, hockey, badminton, athletics, and indoor games. The campus has a permanent sports ground on par with national standards and a gym.

== Departments ==
- General Medicine
- General Surgery
- Obstetrics and Gynaecology
- Pediatrics
- Orthopedics
- Ophthalmology
- ENT
- Dermatology and Venereology
- Psychiatry
- Anaesthesia
- Radiology
- Nephrology
- Neurology
- Urology
- Pulmonology
- Neurosurgery
- Laparoscopic surgery
- Gastroenterology
- Plastic Surgery
- Pediatric Surgery

Additional facilities / features:

- Ayurveda
- Speech and hearing center
- Clinical Psychologist
- clinical pharmacy
- Medico Social Work
- Regional Blood Bank
- Artificial limb Center
- Naturopathy
- Vertigo Clinic
- Headache Clinic
- Head & Neck Cancer Clinic
- Epilepsy Clinic
- Child Guidance Clinic
- Sexual Health Clinic
- Pigmentry Clinic
- Cancer detection Clinic
- Infertility Clinic
- Immunization
- HIV Counseling
- Diabetics
- Hand Surgery
- Laboratory of Vascular Physiology and Medicine<https://bldedu.ac.in/laboratory-of-vascular-physiology-and-medicine/>
- Centre for Advanced Medical Research

== Operation Theatre Complex ==
The college is equipped with the 14 operating tables in the same premises having conducted 50,470 major and minor surgeries.

== Multi specialty surgeries ==
Kidney transplantation and corneal transplantation are conducted in the hospital.
