= Padmanabhapuram =

Town in Kanyakumari district, Tamil Nadu, India

- Town
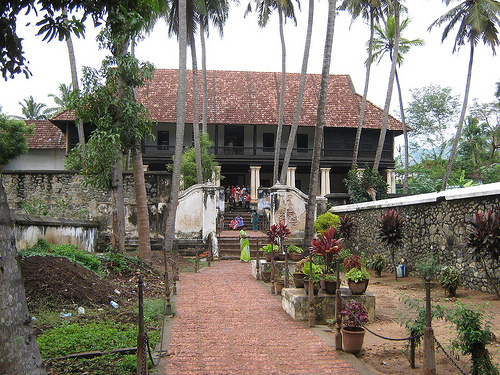
- Padmanabhapuram Palace

- Padmanabhapuram, Tamil Nadu Padmanabhapuram (India)
- Coordinates: 8.244600°N 77.336700°E
- Country: India
- State: Tamil Nadu
- District: Kanniyakumari

Government
  - Type: Second Grade Municipality
  - Body: Padmanabhapuram Municipality
- Elevation: 66 m (217 ft)

Population (2011)
  - Total: 21,342

Languages
  - Official: Tamil, English
- Time zone: UTC+5:30 (IST)
- PIN: 629175
- Telephone code: 04651
- Vehicle registration: TN-75 & TN-74
- Website: https://kanniyakumari.nic.in/

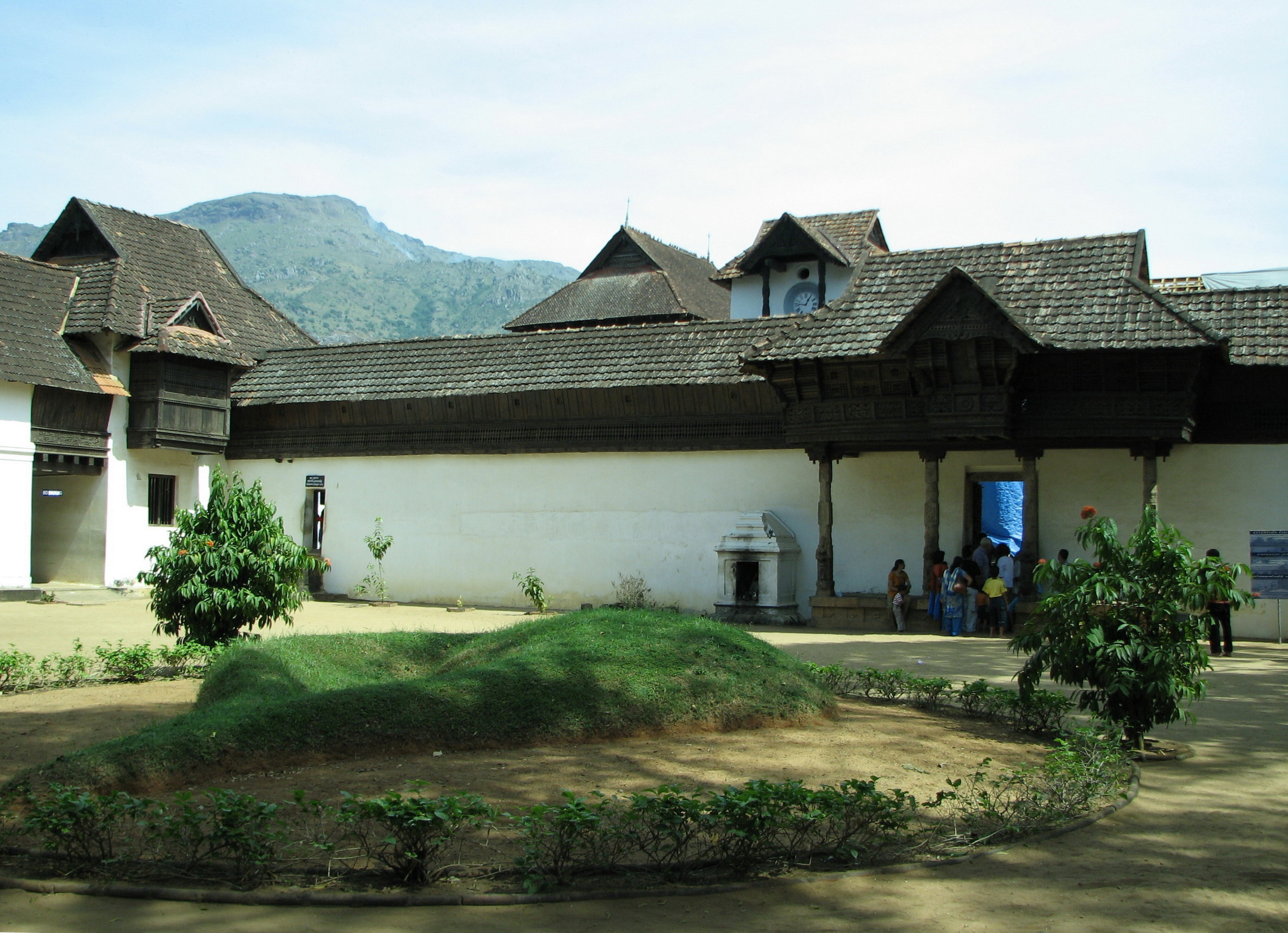
Padmanabhapuram Palace

Padmanabhapuram (Tamil: [pɐd̪mɐnaːbɐpuɾɐm]) is a town near Thuckalay in Kanyakumari district in the Indian state of Tamil Nadu. As of 2011, the town had a population of 21,342. Padmanabhapuram was the capital of Travancore state in the past. In 1795, the King of Travancore, Rama Varma (known as Dharma Raja moved the capital from Padmanabhapuram to Thiruvananthapuram. At that time the boundaries of Travancore state included half the area of modern Kerala state. In 1947, after independence, Padmanabhapuram became part of Travancore-Cochin state during July 1,1949. When Indian states were reorganized on the basis of language in 1956, Padmanabhapuram along with other Tamil majority areas were ceded to Madras State, while the Malayalam-speaking areas of Malabar district and Kasaragod taluk of South canara district of Madras Presidency merged with Thiru-Kochi state and Kerala State was formed in November 1,1956. Later the name of Madras State was changed to Tamil Nadu.

== History ==
Padmanabhapuram was the erstwhile capital of the Kingdom of Travancore (now part of India). The Travancore King, Rama Varma, who was popularly known as Dharma Raja, shifted the capital in 1795 from Padmanabhapuram to Thiruvananthapuram. At that time, the boundaries of the Travancore had extended to less than half of the present day Indian state of Kerala. Up to 1957, Padmanabhapuram formed part of the Travancore Kingdom and subsequently the Travancore-Cochin State. It was when the states were divided on linguistic basis that Kalkulam (including Padmanabhapuram), Vilavancode, Thovala and Agastheeswaram Taluks of erstwhile Thiruvananthapuram District of Travancore-Cochin State were included in the Madras State (later renamed as Tamil Nadu) as Kanyakumari District.

== Geography ==
Padmanabhapuram is located at 8.23°N 77.33°E. It has an average elevation of 15 metres (49 feet).

== Demographics ==
According to 2011 census, Padmanabhapuram had a population of 21,342 with a gender-ratio of 1,029 females for every 1,000 males, much above the national average of 929. A total of 2,120 were under the age of six, constituting 1,084 males and 1,036 females. Scheduled Castes and Scheduled Tribes accounted for 10.61% and .% of the population respectively. The average literacy of the town was 83.92%, compared to the national average of 72.99%. The town had a total of : 5549 households. There were a total of 7,036 workers, comprising 54 cultivators, 388 main agricultural labourers, 87 in house hold industries, 5,481 other workers, 1,026 marginal workers, 16 marginal cultivators, 73 marginal agricultural labourers, 54 marginal workers in household industries and 883 other marginal workers.

== Tourism ==
The popular Padmanabhapuram Palace, the old palace of the Travancore kings, is also located here. It is spread over an area of 6 acres (24,000 m^{2}). The palace is known for its antiques, including the armory of the royal family. The woodwork in this palace is intricate. This palace is maintained by the Government of Kerala's Archaeology Department. According to ancient records, this centuries old palace was built in the Kalkulam forts by Iravi Varma Kulasekharan in the 16th century.

Other tourist locations include Thirparappu Waterfalls, Hanging Bridge in Mathoor, Ancient Jain Temple in Chitharal (a small village situated at a distance of 8 km from Marthandam.) Thiruvalluvar Statue in Kanniyakumari.

One can take a bus from Thiruvananthapuram or Nagercoil and get down at Thuckalay, which is two kilometres away from Padmanabhapuram.

The nearest places around this old capital city of South Travancore is Marunthukottai (It is a very old fort having weapons storage facility), Saralvilai, Kumarakovil (Lord Murugan Temple), Moolachel, Charode, Manali and Udaygiri fort.

== Temple ==
There are many temples around Padmnanbhapuram Palace: Padmanabhapuram Madan-Ishakkiamman Temple, Padmanabhapuram Bhuththan Temple, Padmanabhapuram Pillayar Temple, Padmanabhapuram Murgan Temple, Ramaswamy Temple, Padmanabhapuram Sarswathy Amman Temple, Perumal Temple, Neelakandaswamy Temple and Padmanabhapuram Chettu Samudhaya Mutharamman Temple

Thirukarthikai is the famous festival celebrated at Padmanabhapuram Chettu Samudhaya Mutharamman Temple.

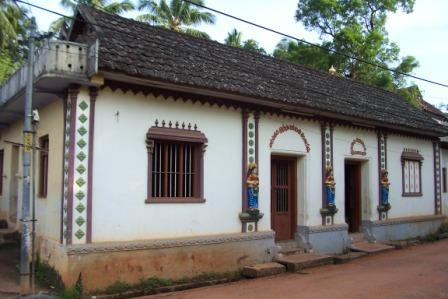
Padmanabhapuram Mutharamman Temple.

Padmanabhapuram Madan-Ishakkiamman Temple.

Padmanabhapuram Bhuthathan Temple.jpg

== Politics ==
Padmanabhapuram assembly constituency is part of Nagercoil (Lok Sabha constituency).
