= GMR Institute of Technology =

Institute in Andhra Pradesh, India

- Type: Educational institutions
- Established: 1997
- Founder: G.M.Rao
- Location: Rajam, Vizianagaram district, Andhra Pradesh, India; 18.46646°N 83.66078°E established = 1997
- Campus: Suburban, 117 acres (0.47 km^{2}) of land
- Website: gmrit.edu.in

GMR Institute of Technology (GMRIT) is an engineering college in India. It is in the Rajam, Vizianagaram district of Andhra Pradesh. It is affiliated to Jawaharlal Nehru Technological University, Kakinada.

== History ==
GMRIT was established in 1997 by the GMR Varalakshmi Foundation — the corporate social responsibility arm of the GMR Group.

Dr. C.L.V.R.S.V. Prasad is principal of GMRIT.

== Departments ==
GMRIT offers a four-year Bachelors in Technology (B.Tech.) programme in eight disciplines. Students are admitted on the basis of merit in EAMCET.

Departments at GMRIT are:

- Civil Engineering
- Computer Science and Engineering
- Computer Science and Engineering(Artificial intelligence & Machine learning)
- Computer Science and Engineering(Artificial intelligence & Data Science)
- Electrical and Electronics Engineering
- Electronics and Communications Engineering
- Information Technology
- Mechanical Engineering

GMRIT offers seven M.Tech. programmes in seven specialized areas of engineering. Students are admitted on the basis of merit scores of GATE/PGCET through common window of counseling for category 'A' seats or category 'B' seats.

M.Tech. program/courses are offered with the following specializations:

- Transportation Engineering
- Computer science & Engineering
- Digital Electronics & Communication Systems
- VLSI Design — Second Shift
- Power and Industrial Drives
- Mechanical — CAD / CAM
- Environmental Engineering

== Rankings ==
University rankings

Engineering – India
- NIRF (2024): 201-300

The National Institutional Ranking Framework (NIRF) ranked the institute in 201-300 band in the engineering rankings in 2024.
