= Kumarakovil =

Kumarakovil Kumarakoil
- Village
- Kumarakovil, Padmanabhapuram, Thuckalay, Kanyakumari, Tamil Nadu
- Coordinates: 8°14′37.3″N 77°20′58.2″E
- Country: India
- State: Tamil Nadu
- District: Kanyakumari
- Elevation: 85.06 m (279.1 ft)

Languages
  - Official: Tamil
- Time zone: UTC+5:30 (IST)
- PIN: 629180
- Vehicle registration: TN-74
- Nearest city: Thucklay

Kumarakoil or Kumarakovil is a small village located in the Kanyakumari district in Tamil Nadu, India. It is the site of an important Murugan temple of the same name.

Kumarakoil can be reached by road from Nagercoil (15 km), Thuckalay (3 km) and Trivandrum (45 km). The area's landscape is characterised by paddy fields, banana gardens, and coconut trees, with mountains visible in the distance.
