= Periyar Maniammai Institute of Science & Technology =

University in Tamil Nadu, India

- Former names: Periyar Maniammai College of Technology for Women; Periyar Maniammai Universitry
- Motto: Think Innovate and Transform
- Type: Private
- Established: 1988
- Accreditation: UGC
- Chancellor: K. Veeramani
- Vice-Chancellor: Dr. V. Ramachandran
- Location: Vallam, Thanjavur District, Tamil Nadu, India
- Campus: 115 acres (47 ha); Rural
- Website: www.pmu.edu

Periyar Maniammai Institute of Science & Technology, formerly Periyar Maniammai College of Technology for Women and Periyar Maniammai University (PMU), is a private deemed-to-be university headquarters is in the town of Vallam in Thanjavur, Tamil Nadu, India. The campus is on 115 acres (47 ha) 45 km (28 mi) east of Tiruchirapalli and 10 km (6.2 mi) west of Thanjavur.

== History ==
The Periyar Maniammai Institute of Science & Technology was established in 1988 as Periyar Maniammai College of Technology for Women, named after social reformers Periyar and his wife Annai E. V. R. Maniammai. The college was originally affiliated to Bharathidasan University until 2001, when it was reassigned to Anna University. In 2007 it was awarded the deemed-to-be-university status and renamed as Periyar Maniammai University. The decision on University status was halted by the Supreme Court and the issue was left undecided until 2014. In 2017, following the University Grants Commission's directive to 123 institutes of India not to use "university" in the title of deemed universities, it was renamed Periyar Maniammai Institute of Science & Technology.

== Faculty and departments ==
- Faculty of Architecture and Planning
  - Department of Architecture
- Faculty of Engineering and Technology
  - Department of Aerospace Engineering
  - Department of Biotechnology
  - Department of Civil Engineering
  - Department of Electronics and Communication Engineering
  - Department of Electrical and Electronics Engineering
  - Department of Mechanical Engineering
- Faculty of Computing Sciences and Engineering (FCSE)
  - Department of Computer Science and Engineering
  - Department of Information Technology
  - Department of Computer Science and Applications
  - Department of Software Engineering
- Faculty of Humanities, Science and Management (FHSM)
  - Commerce
  - Chemistry
  - English
  - Mathematics
  - Physics
  - Management Studies
  - Education
  - Physical Education
