= Vallam =

- town
- Vallam
- Thanjavur in Tamil Nadu, India
- Coordinates: 10.72°N 79.08°E
- Countryside: India
- State: Tamil Nadu
- Elevation: 75 m (246 ft)

Population (2011)
  - Total: 14,110

Tamil
  - Official: Tamil
- Time zone: UTC+5:30 (IST)
- Postal code: 627809

Vallam is a panchayat town in the Thanjavur taluk of Thanjavur district in the Indian state of Tamil Nadu.

== Demographics ==
As of the 2011 Indian census, Vallam has a population of 14,495. Males constituted 48% and females 52%. Vallam has an average literacy rate of 73%, higher than the national average of 59.5%: male literacy is 77% and female literacy is 69%. In Vallam, 11% of the population is under 6.

== Religious sites ==
=== Hindu Temples ===
Agowri Amman is a 1000- to 2000-year-old temple. Mother Agowri graces the temple with two heads sitting on a lotus-shaped Peeta. One face is ferocious, with long and sharp teeth showing her destructive side against the demons. The other above is calm, smiling and all graceful protecting the devotees and righteous from evils. The Mother has different weapons in Her eight hands and also a parrot representing Mother Parvati. Sri Chakra, an important form of Shakti worship, is installed under Mother Agowri's feet.

The last Friday of Aadi month and Aadi Perukku (July–August), new moon and full moon days are celebrated.

Maha chandi homam is conducted every year during chithra pournami (full moon day).

Malai Mel Ayyanar temple This temple dates to Karikala's time, circa 100 BC-190 AD. It is located in an elevated terrain. The main deity is Ayyanar accompanied by his two consorts.

=== Islamic Masjids ===
Four mosques operate in central Vallam.

Eid Ka Masjid is situated on the highest hill, some distance from the Jummah masjid and market. Every year, Eid-Ul-Alha is held there. The mosque is over 150 years old.

Mela Pallivasal masjid is situated near Aanna statue near the market and is built with white marble. More than 100 years old, it is the oldest masjid there. Islamic Madarasa is situated near for younger Islamic childs to learn Islamic knowledge and Religious harmony.

Jumma Masjid is the biggest masjid, where Eid-Ul-Fithr (Ramadan) celebrations are an important aspect of this masjid as it is large enough to hold thousands of devotees.

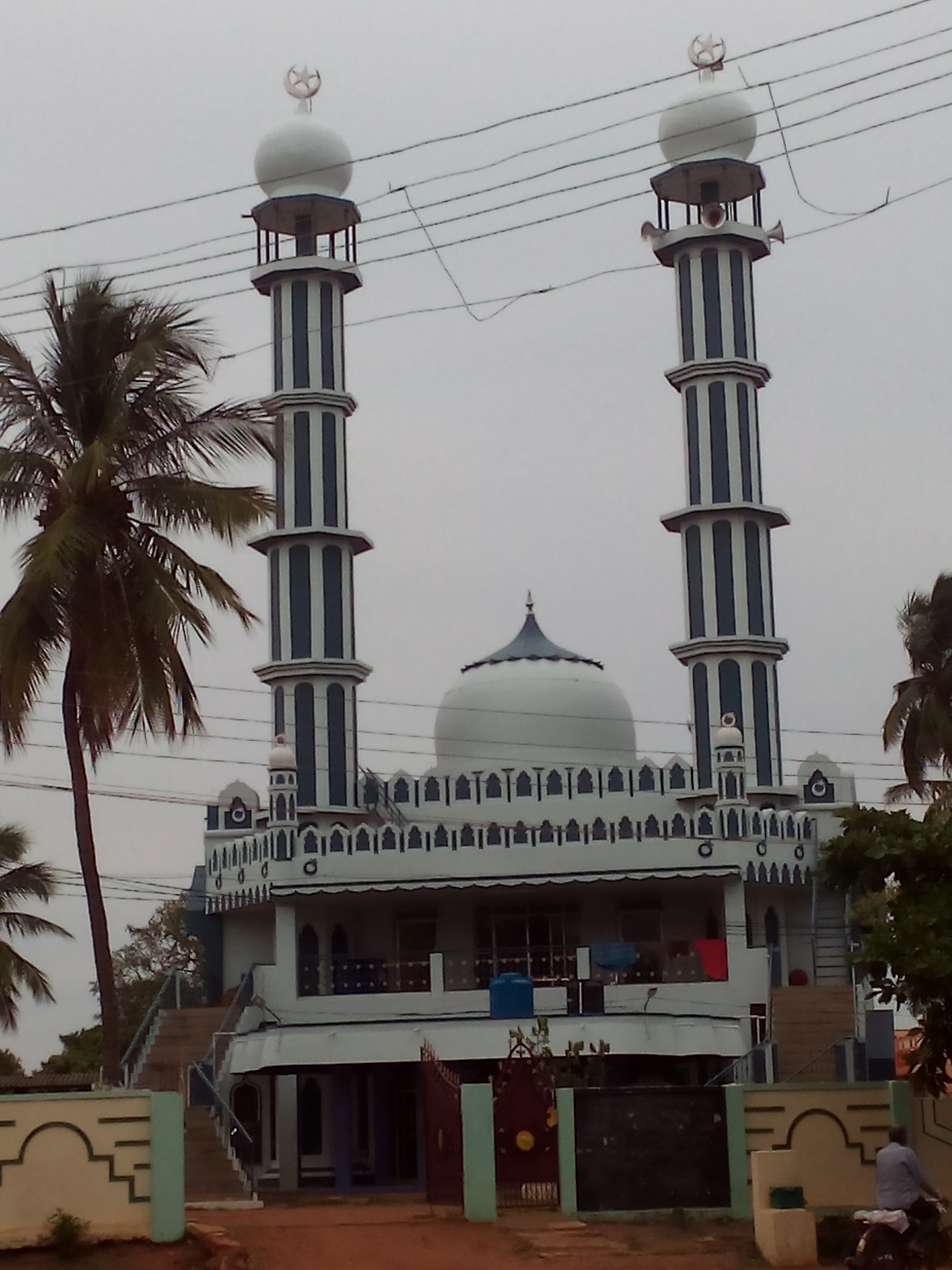
Jumma Masjid(Mosque) is the biggest mosque in Vallam

Tawakalshah-Durgah is a 100-year old religious leader's graveyard. Where irrespective of religion, everyone visit there to pay respect to the Elder.

A new mosque opened for prayer in July 2013. This mosque has a capacity for 100 worshipers and is located in the Anna Nagar area.

=== Christian Church ===
St. Xavier's Church is a traditional Christian church, over 100 years old. It is located near the bus terminal. The church has a famous history and an associated school. St. Xavier's Middle School is locally called a "Matha" school.

== Education ==
Vallam is known for its number of higher educational institutions. It has two Deemed Universities. They are Periyar Maniammai University and PRIST University and they offer predominantly engineering courses. They were initially started as Engineering Colleges, later they were deemed as Universities under UGC Act. Another deemed institution is SASTRA University, which is 3 km from Vallam. Vallam also has many Colleges include Adaikalamatha College, Swami Vivekananda Arts and Science College, Maruthupandiar Arts and Science College, Ponnaiya Ramajayam Engineering College and Periyar Polytechnic. Tamil University is also at located 3 km away from here. Vallam also have Government Model Higher Secondary School (Girls), Fr. Antony Higher Secondary School, Kalaimagal Higher Secondary School and a CBSE school called Ramya Sathiyanathan Senior Secondary School.

Government Boys Higher Secondary School is the oldest school in the town. Its building is from the British Period. Previously used as Horse Tent at British time. Since independence, it has become one of the best school from where many students received a good education.

== Rural development ==
The Vallam town panchayat has taken the lead in environment protection. Roads made from plastic wastes range up to a distance of 1,075 metres.
