= Meenakshi Academy of Higher Education and Research =

Private deemed-to-be-university in Tamil Nadu, India

Coordinates: 13.014°N 80.107°E

The Meenakshi Academy of Higher Education and Research (MAHER), commonly referred to as Meenakshi University, is a private deemed-to-be-university for mainly medical science in Chennai, Tamil Nadu, India.

== History ==
Meenakshi University was created in the year 1983 by the Ministry of Human Resource Development and received approval of the University Grants Commission.

The chancellor is Thiru A.N. Radhakrishnan and the vice-chancellor is T. Gunasagaran.

== Affiliates ==
Meenakshi University includes Meenakshi Medical College and Research Institute (in Enathur, Kanchipuram); Meenakshi Ammal Dental College in Maduravoyal, Chennai; Meenakshi Engineering College in K. K. Nagar, and Meenakshi College of Nursing in Mangadu, Faculty of Engineering and Technology Mangadu, Chennai.

== Academics ==
The university awards the following undergraduate degrees: Bachelor of Medicine, Bachelor of Surgery, Bachelor of Dental Surgery, Bachelor of Science (Nursing), and Bachelor of Physiotherapy and Bachelor of Engineering.

It awards the following postgraduate degrees: Master of Medical Education, Master of Science, Master of Dental Surgery, Master of Science (Nursing), Master of Physiotherapy and Bachelor in Engineering. It also offers specialty courses leading to a doctorate in medicine or master's in chirurgical, as well as PhD programs.

=== Rankings ===
University and College rankings

General – India
- NIRF (Overall) (2023): 151–200
- NIRF (Universities) (2023): 101-150

Dental – India
- NIRF (2024): 13

Meenakshi Academy of Higher Education and Research was ranked in the 101-150 band among universities in India by the National Institutional Ranking Framework (NIRF) in 2023 and in the 151-200 band in overall category. It was ranked 13th in NIRF dental ranking 2024.

== Constituent Institutions ==
=== Meenakshi College of Engineering, K.K. Nagar ===
Meenakshi College of Engineering (MCE), established in 2001 by the Meenakshi Ammal Trust, is a constituent institution of the Meenakshi Academy of Higher Education and Research (MAHER) located in K.K. Nagar, Chennai, Tamil Nadu, India.

The college is approved by the All India Council for Technical Education (AICTE) and affiliated with Anna University, Chennai.

MCE offers undergraduate (B.E./B.Tech) and postgraduate (M.E./M.Tech) programmes in disciplines such as Computer Science and Engineering, Electronics and Communication Engineering, Electrical and Electronics Engineering, Civil Engineering, and Mechanical Engineering.

The institution maintains modern academic infrastructure with well-equipped laboratories, digital learning resources, and placement training facilities. Several programmes have received accreditation from NAAC and NBA.

MCE is part of the educational network managed by the Meenakshi Ammal Trust, which also oversees Meenakshi Ammal Arts and Science College and Meenakshi Ammal Industrial Training Institute.
