= Amirthakadeswarar Temple =

Hindu temple in Tamil Nadu

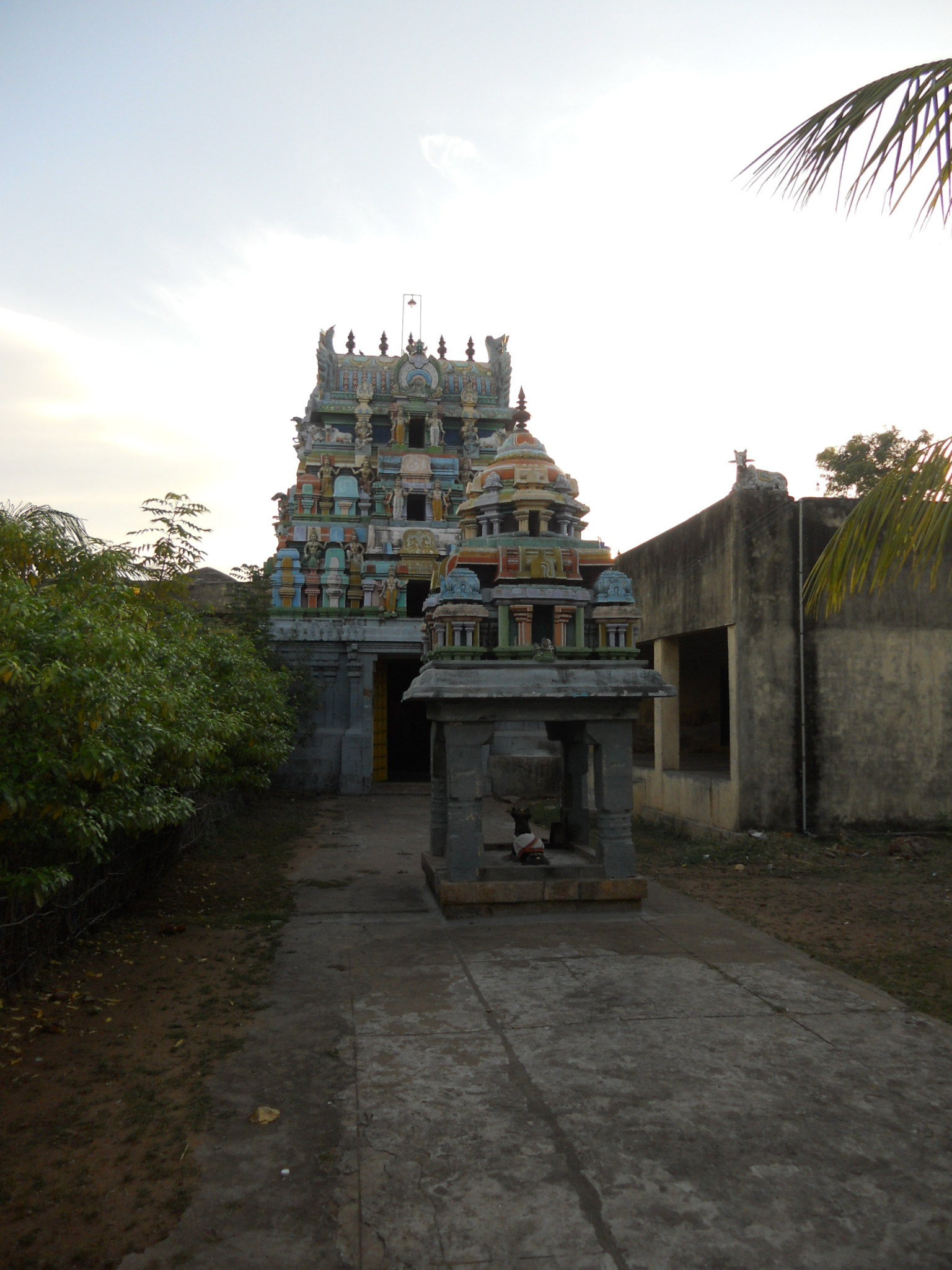

- Location in Tamil Nadu

Religion
- Affiliation: Hinduism
- District: Thanjavur
- Deity: Amirthakadeswarar (Shiva), Amirthavalli (Parvathi)
- Features: Temple tank: Nalveda Theertham; Temple tree: Vanni

Location
- Location: Sakkottai
- State: Tamil Nadu
- Country: India
- Coordinates: 10°56′7.09″N 79°23′59.4″E

Architecture
- Type: Dravidian architecture

Amirthakadeswarar Temple (அமிர்தகடேஸ்வரர் கோயில், சாக்கோட்டை) is a Hindu temple dedicated to the deity Shiva, located at Sakkottai in Tamil Nadu, India. The temple is dedicated to Shiva. Shiva is worshiped as Amirthakadeswarar, and is represented by the lingam. His consort Parvati is depicted as Amirthavalli Amman. The presiding deity is revered in the 7th century Tamil Saiva canonical work, the Tevaram, written by Tamil saint poets known as the Nayanmars and classified as Paadal Petra Sthalam.

As per Hindu legend, the essence of creation arrived at this place in a pot (locally called kalayam), the place came to be known as Kalayanallur. The temple is closely associated with Sakya Nayanmar, one of 63 saints associated with Saivism. The temple has four daily rituals at various times from 7:00 a.m. to 10 p.m., and three major yearly festivals on its calendar. Maha Shivrathri and Masi Magam during the Tamil month of Masi (February - March) and Margazhi Tiruvadhirai during Margazhi (December - January) are the major festivals celebrated in the temple.

The temple complex houses a three-tier known as gopuram (gateway tower) and has moats inside and outside the surrounding walls. The temple has numerous shrines, with those of Amirthakadeswarar and Amirthavalli Amman being the most prominent. The present masonry structure was built during the Chola dynasty in the 9th century, while later expansions are attributed to Thanjavur Nayaks. The image of Lingothbhava is made of emerald, while the image of Ardhanarishvara is depicted with his right leg in relaxing posture. The temple is maintained and administered by the Hindu Religious and Charitable Endowments Department of the Government of Tamil Nadu.

== Legend ==
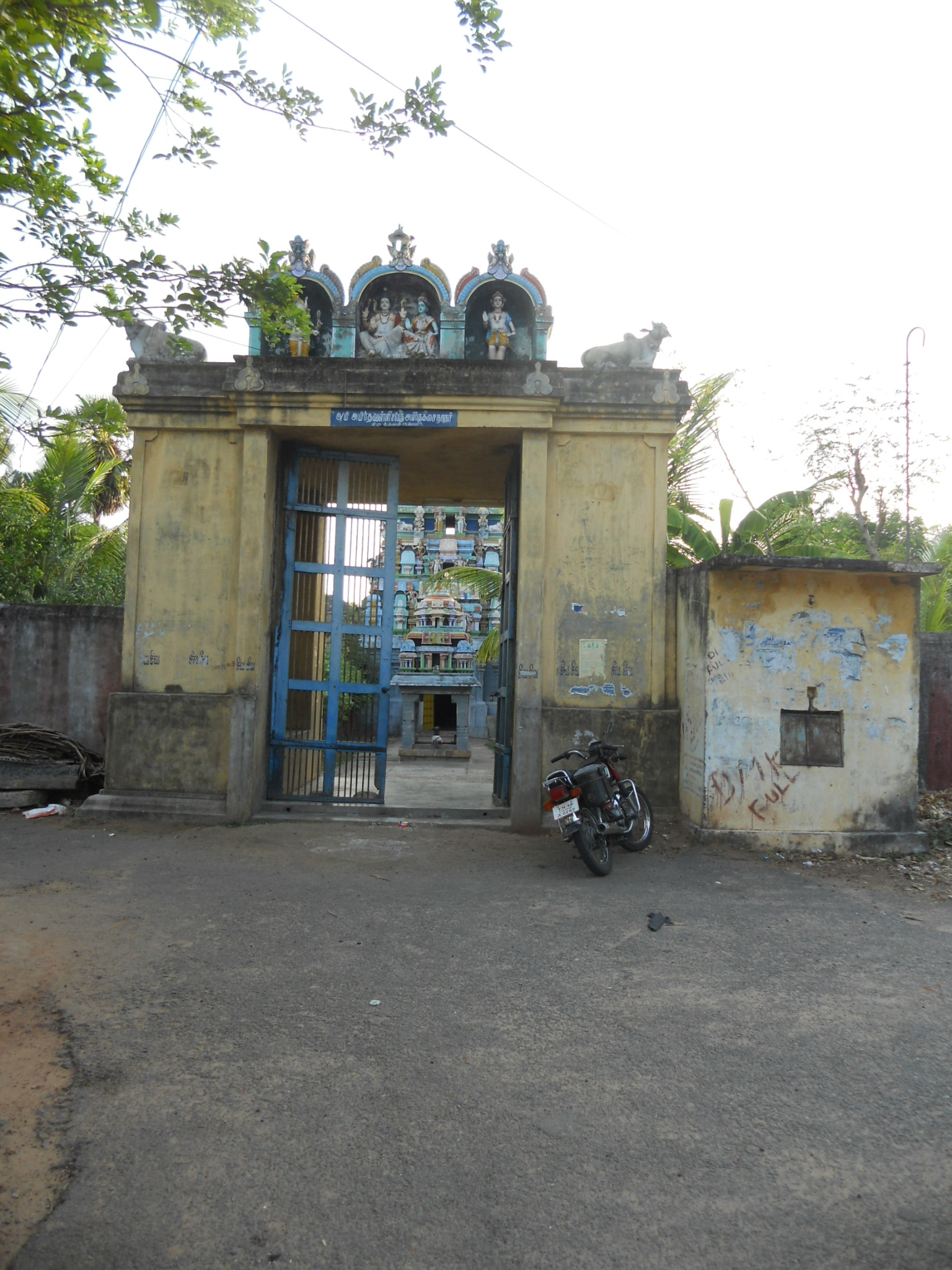
View of the temple

As per Hindu legend, the essence of creation arrived at this place in a pot during deluge. Since the pot (locally called kalayam) arrived here, it was called Kalayanallur. Sambandar in his works in Tevaram mentions that this place was originally occupied by Buddhists (Calukkiyar) and hence it came to be known as Cakkiyarkkottai, which with time became Cakkottai.

Another legend states that Nayanmar saint Sakya was a staunch devotee of Shiva. He used to wear in Sakya style, which was not typical of Saivism. He used to worship Shiva at this place and even did puja for a stone he crossed. In his devotion, he used to forget that he was adorning the image of Shiva with stones instead of flowers. One day he forgot to do his austerities and started consuming food. He suddenly realised his mistake and ran to the place where he usually worships Shiva to find stones from Kailash started falling at his feet, with Shiva and Parvathy appearing before him. It is believed that as Sakya worshipped Shiva here, the place used to be called Sakkottai.

== Architecture ==
The present masonry structure was built during the Chola dynasty in the 9th century, while later expansions are attributed to Thanjavur Nayaks. The temple has a three-tiered rajagopuram (temple tower gateway) and has a moat both inside and outside its surrounding walls. There is a Saptamatrikas sculpted in a single panel and image of Tapsiviyaman. The Dakshinamurthy sculpture on the temple is unique as it is depicted with four hands - the upper right holding a bead made of Rudraksha, the upper left holding Agni (fire), the lower right holding cinmudra and lower left holding palm leaves. The temple tank associated with it is called Caturveda Tirtha, while the tree associated with the temple is Vanni. The presiding deity is Shiva in the form of Amirthakalasanathar or Amirthakadeswarar. The consort is Amirthavalli. Most of the shrines were constructed by the Medieval Cholas. There are shrines to Murugan and Ganesa. There is also a brick halls from the Thanjavur Nayak period. The image of Lingothbhava is made of emerald, while the image of Ardhanarishvara is depicted with his right leg in relaxing posture. There are smaller shrines for Dhandapani Muruga in a small size and Nardana Vinayaka on the southern side. The front hall houses the Nandi Bali Peeta.

== Religious Significance ==
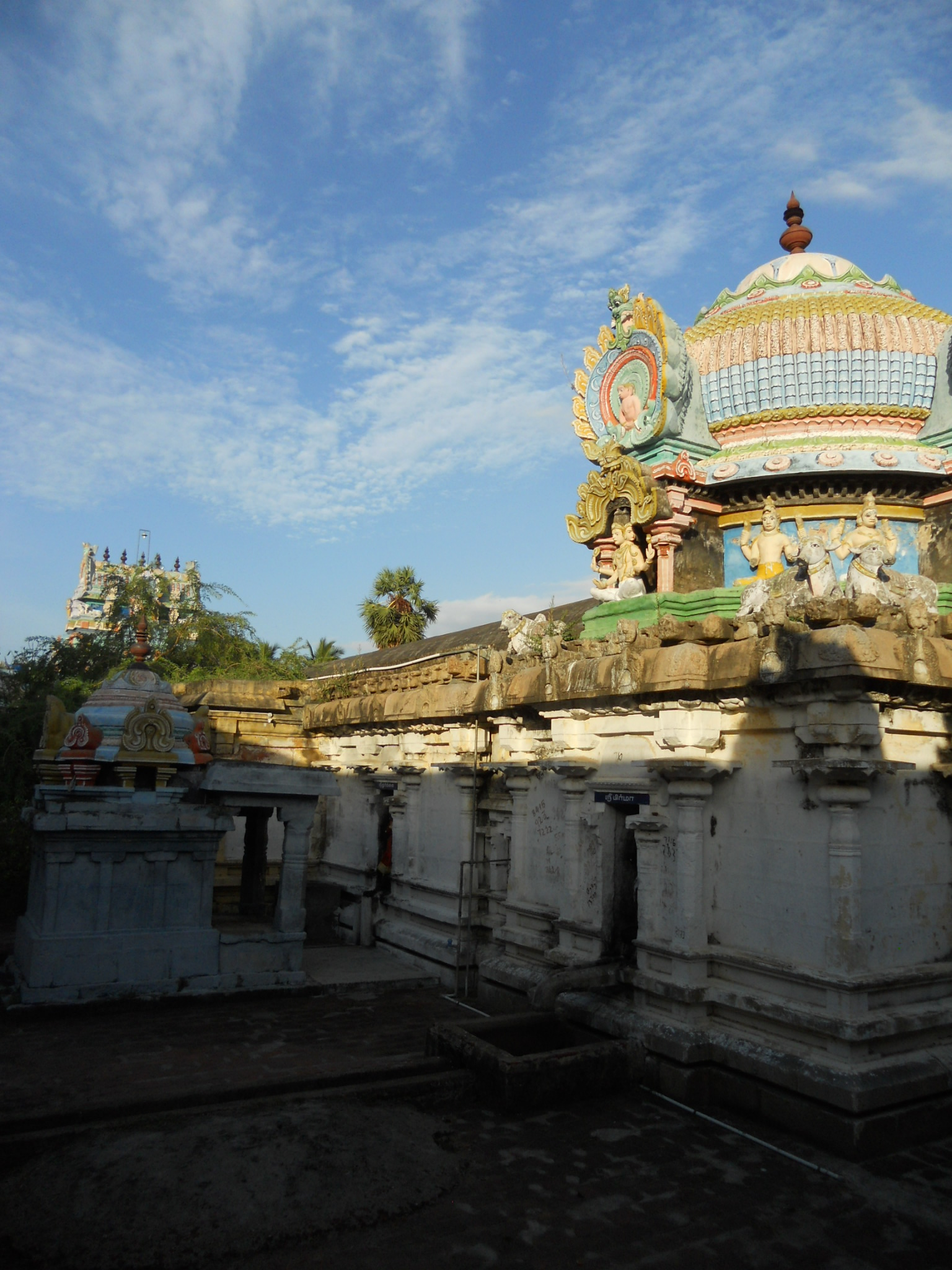
Sakottai temple view

Sakkottai is associated with the life of the Nayanmar, Sakya Nayanar who resided here. It is also the place where Brahma worshipped Shiva. Hymns in praise of the temple have been written by Sundarar. Sundarar venerated Amirtakateswarar in ten verses in Tevaram, compiled as the Seventh Tirumurai. As the temple is revered in Tevaram, it is classified as Paadal Petra Sthalam, one of the 276 temples that find mention in the Saiva canon.

== Specialty ==
12 Shiva temples are connected with Mahamaham festival which happens once in 12 years in Kumbakonam. They are:

- Kasi Visanathar Temple,
- Adi Kumbeswarar Temple,
- Someswarar Temple,
- Nageswaraswamy Temple,
- Kalahasteeswarar Temple,
- Gowthameswarar Temple,
- Kodeeswarar Temple,
- Amirthakadeswarar Temple,
- Banapuriswarar Temple,
- Abimukeswarar Temple,
- Kambatta Viswanathar Temple and
- Ekambareswarar Temple.

This temple is one among them.

== Kumbakonam Sapta Stana Temple ==
This is one of the Saptha Stana Temples of Kumbakonam. During the Mahahaman of 2016 the palanquin festival was held on 7 February 2016. Following the tirttavari held at Mahamaham tank on 21 April 2016, the palanquin festival of the Sapta Stana Temples were held on 23 April 2016. The festival which started from Kumbesvara Temple at the 7.30 p.m. of 23 April 2016 completed on the morning of 25 April 2016 after going to the following temples.

- Adi Kumbeswarar Temple, Kumbakonam
- Amirthakadeswarar Temple, Sakkottai
- Avudainathar Temple, Darasuram
- Kabartheeswarar Temple
- Kottaiyur Kodeeswarar Temple
- Kailasanathar Temple, Melakaveri
- Swaminatha Swamy Temple

== Religious practises and festivals ==
The temple priests perform the pooja (rituals) during festivals and on a daily basis. Like other Shiva temples of Tamil Nadu, the priests belong to the Shaivaite community, a Brahmin sub-caste. The temple rituals are performed four times a day; Kalasanthi at 8:00 a.m., Uchikalam at 10:00 a.m., Sayarakshai at 6:00 p.m. and Ardha Jamam at 10:00 p.m. Each ritual comprises four steps: abhisheka (sacred bath), alangaram (decoration), neivethanam (food offering) and deepa aradanai (waving of lamps) for both Annamalaiyar and Unnamulai Amman. The worship is held amidst music with nagaswaram (pipe instrument) and tavil (percussion instrument), religious instructions in the Vedas read by priests and prostration by worshippers in front of the temple mast. There are weekly rituals like somavaram and sukravaram, fortnightly rituals like pradosham and monthly festivals like amavasai (new moon day), kiruthigai, pournami (full moon day) and sathurthi. Maha Shivrathri and Masi Magam during the Tamil month of Masi (February - March) and Margazhi Tiruvadhirai during Margazhi (December - January) are the major festivals celebrated in the temple.

== Kumbabishegam ==
The Kumbabishegam of the temple was held on 22 October 2015.

== Kumbabishegam 22 October 2015 ==
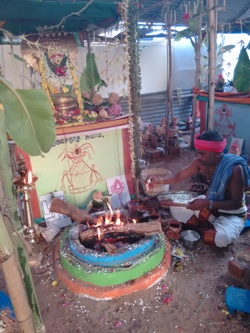

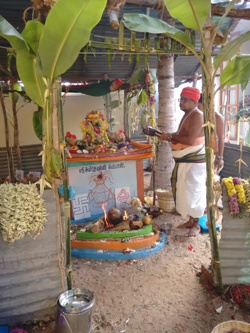

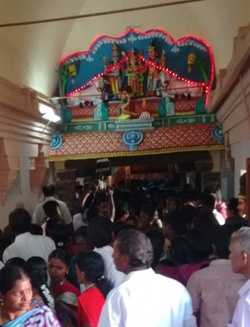

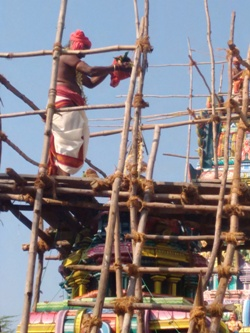

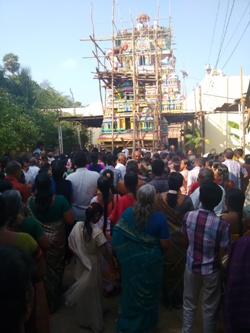

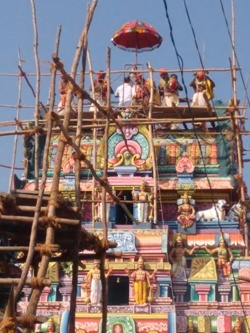

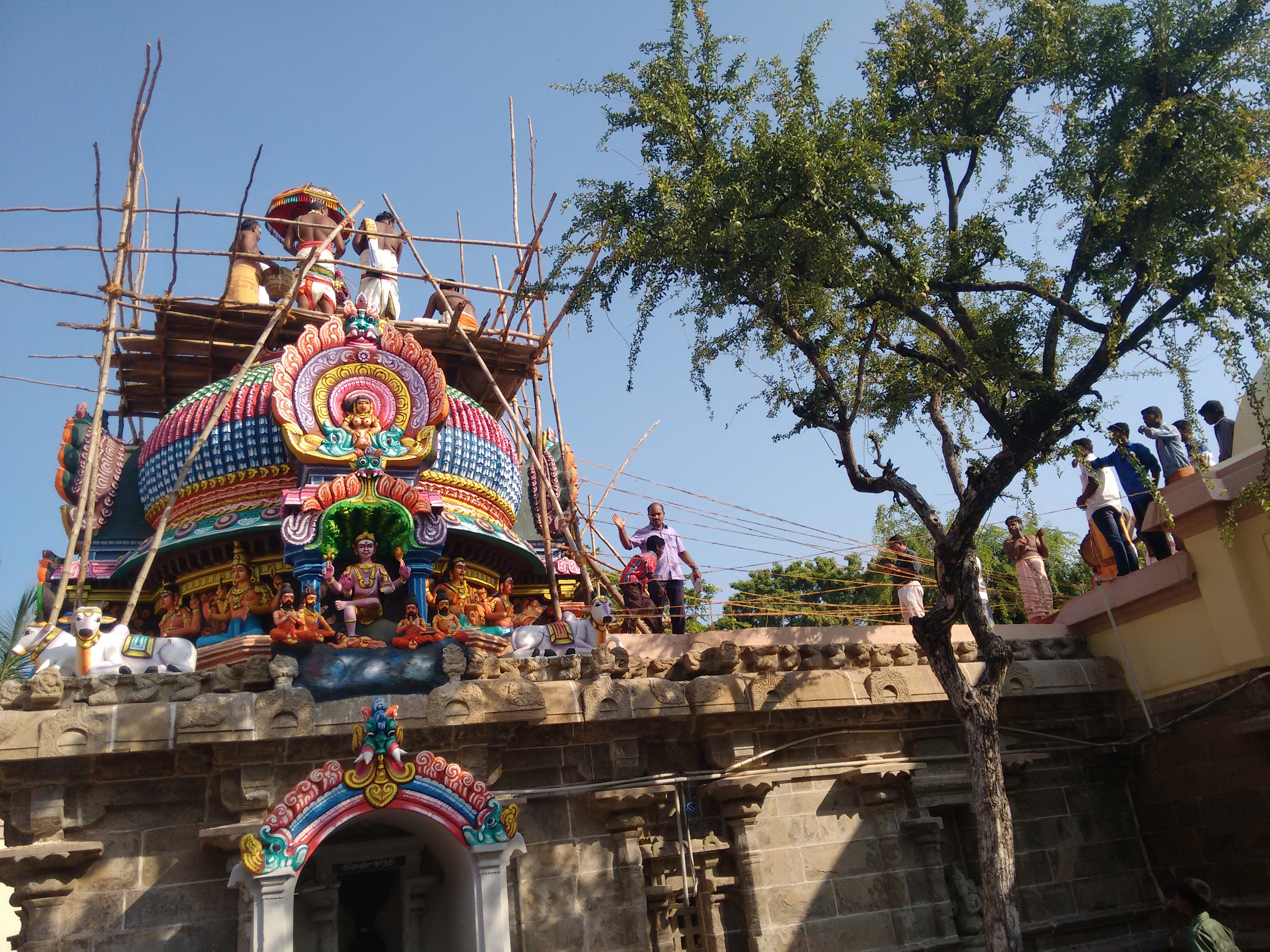
