= Sikharagiriswara Temple, Kudumiyamalai =

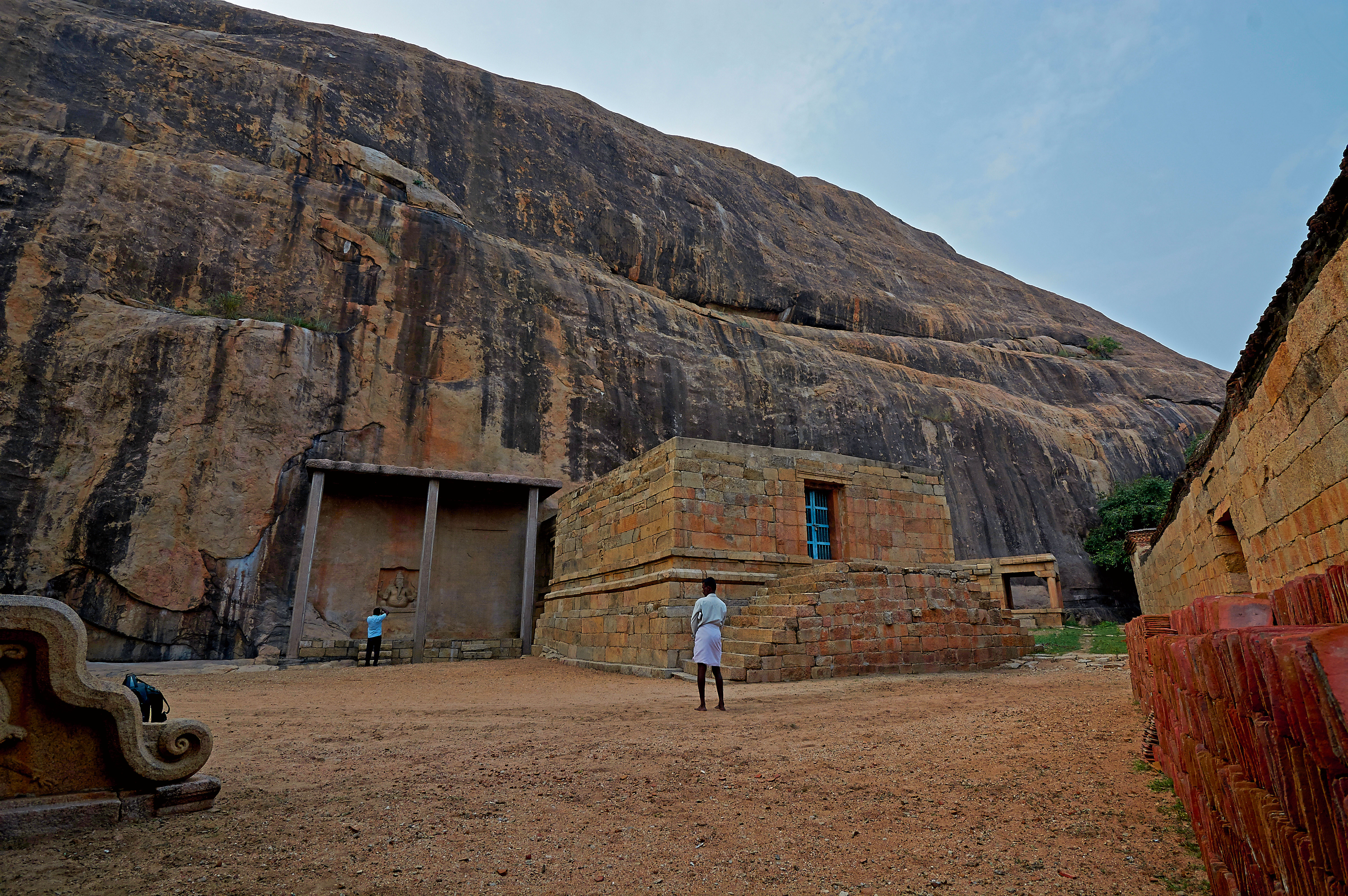

Religion
- Affiliation: Hinduism
- District: Kudumiyamalai

Location
- Country: India
- Interactive map of Sikharagiriswara Temple, Kudumiyamalai
- Coordinates: 10.41651°N 78.659634°E

Sikharagiriswara Temple is a Hindu temple situated in the village of Kudumiyanmalai at a distance of 20 kilometres from Pudukkottai. The temple complex includes a 1000-pillared hall and has many inscriptions by the Pallava king Mahendravarman including a treatise on music. Similar architecture of halls (Mandapas) simulating a chariot drawn by elephant or horses is found in Sarangapani temple at Kumbakonam, Mela Kadambur Amirthakadeswarar Temple, Nageswaraswamy Temple, Kumbakonam, Vriddhagiriswarar Temple, Vriddhachalam and Thyagaraja Temple, Tiruvarur.
