= Avudainathar Temple, Darasuram =

Shiva temple in Tamil Nadu, India

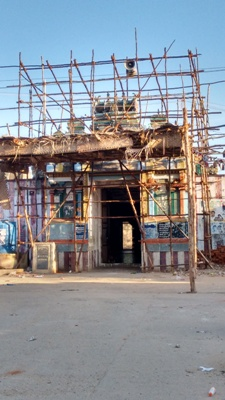
Entrance

Avudainathar Temple is a Shiva Temple in Darasuram, Thanjavur district, Tamil Nadu, India.

== Location ==
The temple is located at Kammalar street in Darasuram in Kumbakonam-Thanjavur road.

== Kumbakonam Sapta Stana Temple ==
This is one of the Saptha Stana Temples of Kumbakonam. During the Mahahaman of 2016 the palanquin festival was held on 7 February 2016. Following the tirttavari held at Mahamaham tank on 21 April 2016, the palanquin festival of the Sapta Stana Temples were held on 23 April 2016. The festival which started from Kumbesvara Temple at the 7.30 p.m. of 23 April 2016 completed on the morning of 25 April 2016 after going to the following temples.

- Adi Kumbeswarar Temple, Kumbakonam
- Amirthakadeswarar Temple, Sakkottai
- Avudainathar Temple, Darasuram
- Kabartheeswarar Temple
- Kottaiyur Kodeeswarar Temple
- Kailasanathar Temple, Melakaveri
- Swaminatha Swamy Temple
