= Mela Kadambur Amirthakadeswarar Temple =

Hindu temple in Tamil Nadu, India

Coordinates: 11.236737°N 79.527060°E

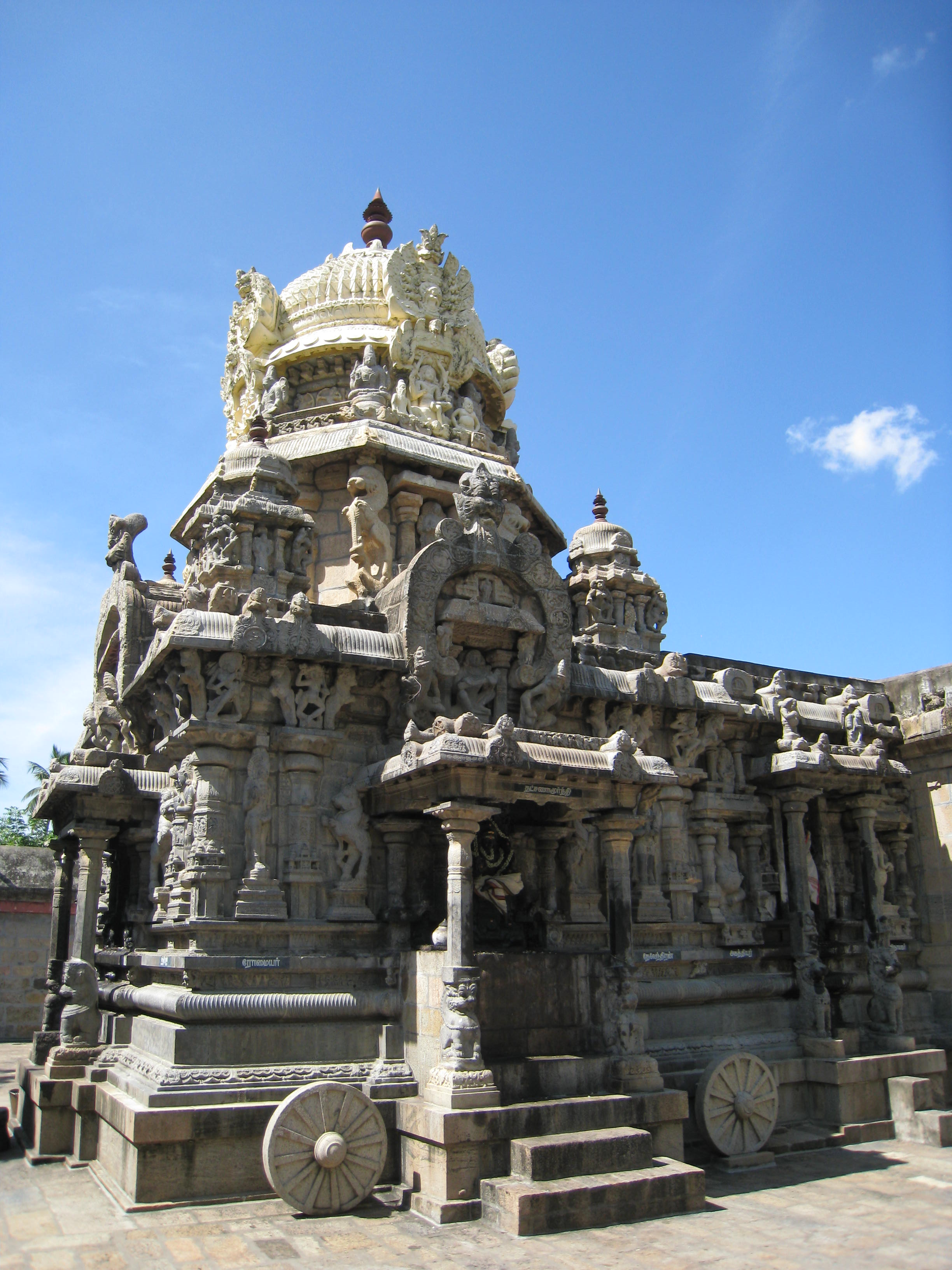
Profile view, Amrithakadeswarar temple Melakadambur

Mela Kadambur Amirthakadeswarar Temple (மேலக்கடம்பூர் அமிர்தகடேஸ்வரர் கோயில்) (Sanskrit: Amruta: nectar Ghata: pot Iswara: God) is a Hindu temple located at Melakadambur in Cuddalore district of Tamil Nadu, India. The historical name of the place is Tirukadambur. The presiding deity is Shiva. He is called as Amirtha Kadeswarar. His consort is known as Vidyujothi Nayaki. The temple has beautiful sculptures and the vimana is in the form of a chariot. It was built by emperor Kulottunga Chola I.

== Etymology ==
The name of the temple is derived from the words Amritha meaning nectar, K(Gh)ada meaning pot and Eeswara meaning Lord Shiva.

== Temple legend ==
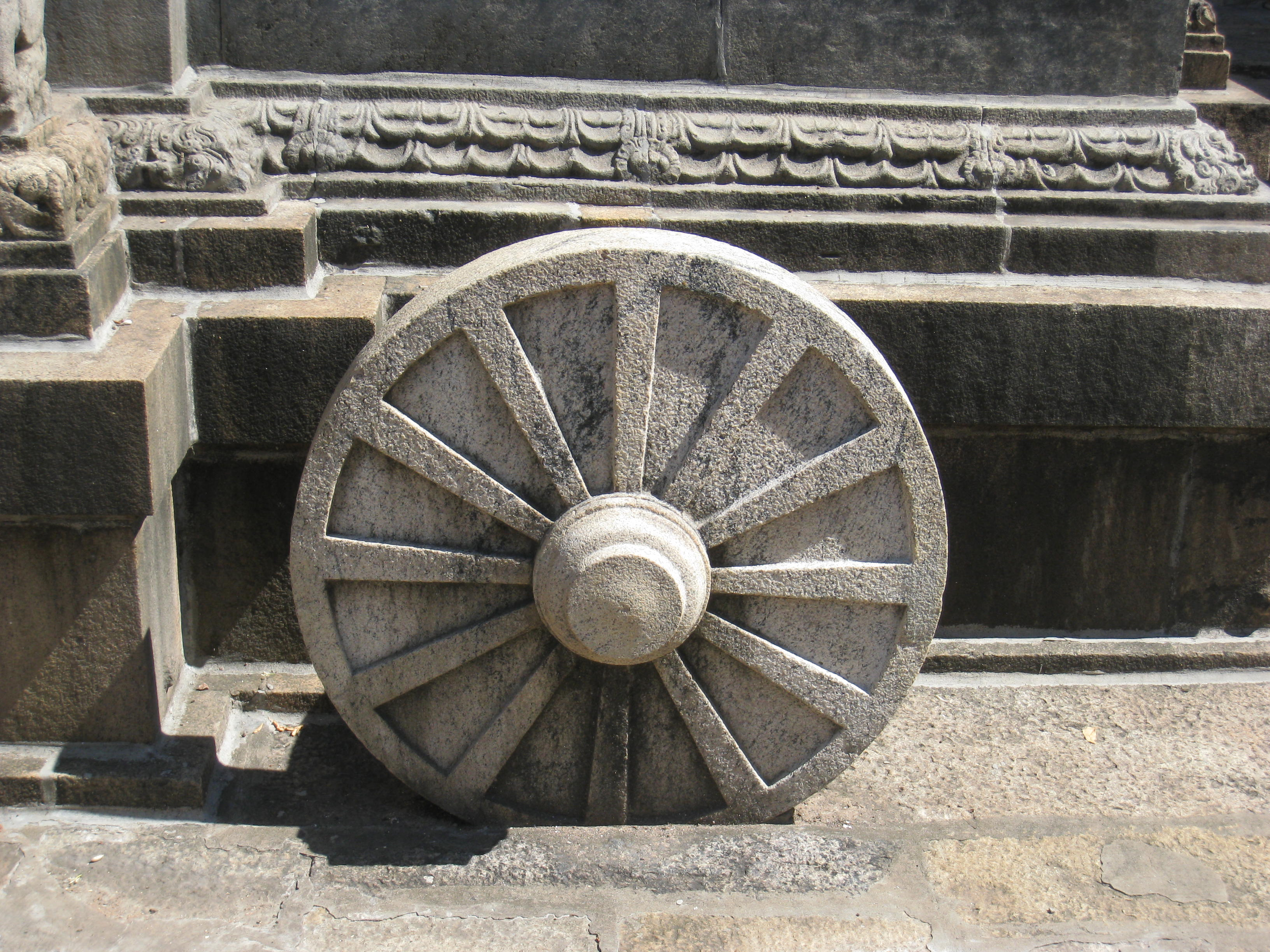
Sunken wheel of Chariot, Amrithakadeswarar temple Melakadambur

When the Devas won the nectar from the Asuras, they began drinking it without paying due respect to Lord Ganesha. This infuriated him and he took away the pot of nectar. When he was passing through this place a drop of nectar fell and got manifested as a Swayambhu Linga. Realising their mistake, Indra and the other Devas asked Ganesha to forgive them who in turn returned the pot of nectar and told the Devas to worship Lord Shiva here as AmrithaKadeshwarar.

Aditi the mother of Devas came here to worship Lord Shiva every day. So, Indra decided to turn the temple into a chariot and have it pulled to Devaloka, the abode of Devas so that his mother did not have to visit this place to worship Shiva every day. Lord Ganesha having noticed this pressed the chariot with his leg and as a consequence one of the wheels sank and got stuck into the ground. Indra then prayed to Ganesha and requested to allow him to move the temple to Devaloka. Ganesha agreed to let the temple go if Indra installed a crore lingas. However, when Indra tried installing the lingas every piece got damaged and finally Indra went back to Shiva, his pride broken, and requested him for help. Shiva in the form of Lord Amrithakadeswarar then asked Indra to install one linga by chanting his name a thousand times. Accordingly, when Indra completed the penance, Lord Shiva appeared before him and told him that he wished to stay in the same place and worship Amrithakadeswarar on behalf of Aditi, Indra's mother. It is believed that Indra visits the temple every day to worship Lord Shiva in the form of Amrithakadeswarar.

The temple has been well preserved and the chariot with one of its wheels stuck in the ground can be seen to this day.

== Architecture ==
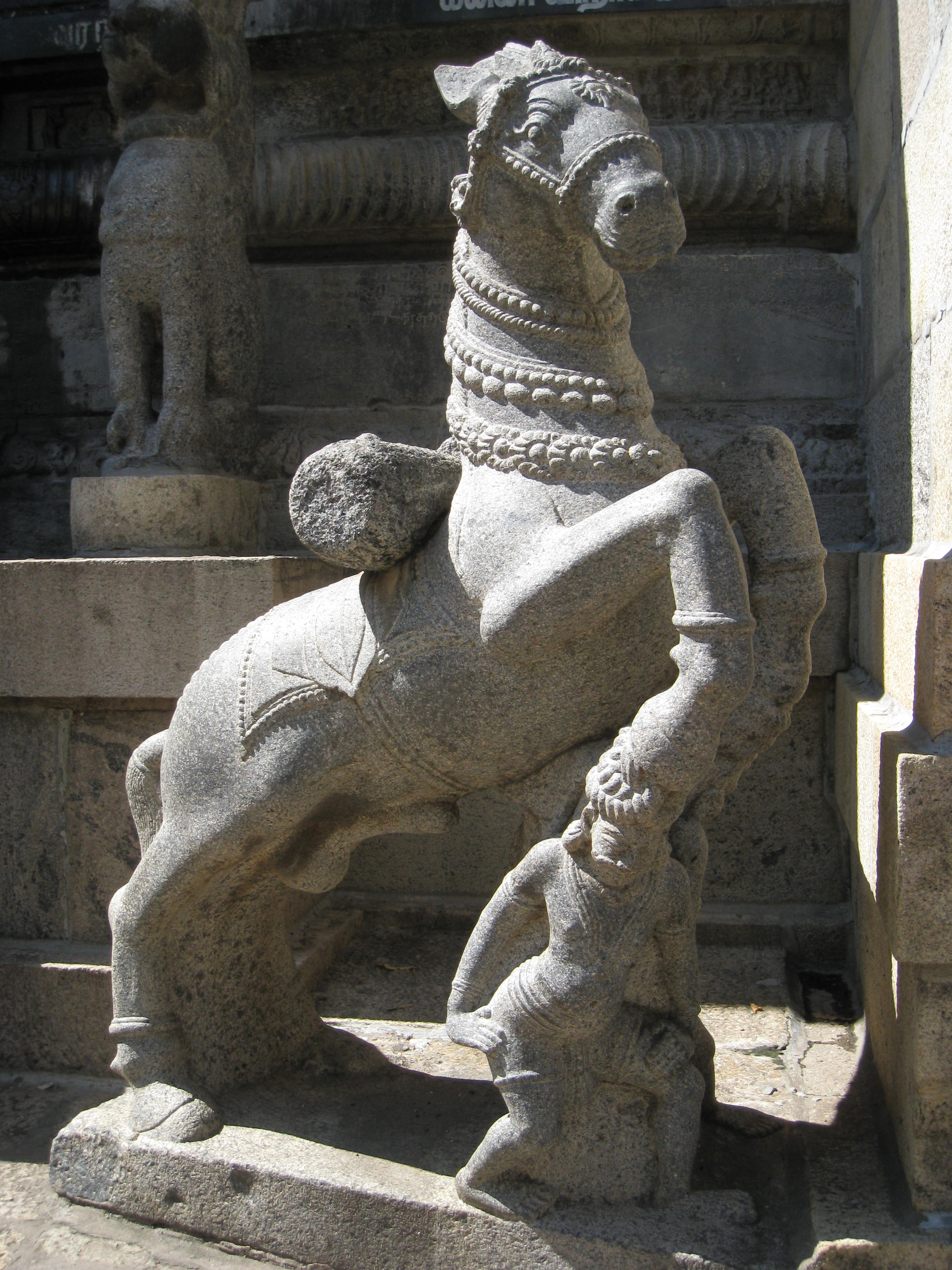
Horse detail Amrithakadeswarar temple Melakadambur

The temple is constructed in Dravidian style of architecture. It is classified as Karak kovil, a temple built resembling the shape of a chariot used during temple festivals. Literary evidence is found in Tamil works, which refer the temple as Karak Koil. Similar architecture of halls (Mandapas) simulating a chariot drawn by elephant or horses is found in Sarangapani temple at Kumbakonam, Sikharagiriswara Temple, Kudumiyamalai, Nageswaraswamy Temple, Kumbakonam, Vriddhagiriswarar Temple, Vriddhachalam and Thyagaraja Temple, Tiruvarur.

== Significance ==
It is one of the shrines of the 275 Paadal Petra Sthalams - Shiva Sthalams glorified in the early medieval Tevaram poems by Tamil Saivite Nayanars Tirunavukkarasar and Sundarar. It is the 88th Paadal Petra Sthalam and the 34th Sthalam on the north side of the river Kaveri in the Chola country.

== Literary Mention ==
Tirunavukkarasar describes the feature of the deity as:

நங்க டம்பனைப் பெற்றவள் பங்கினன்

தென்க டம்பைத் திருக்கரக் கோயிலோன்
தன்க டன்னடி யேனையுந் தாங்குதல்

என்க டன்பணி செய்து கிடப்பதே.

== Sculptures ==
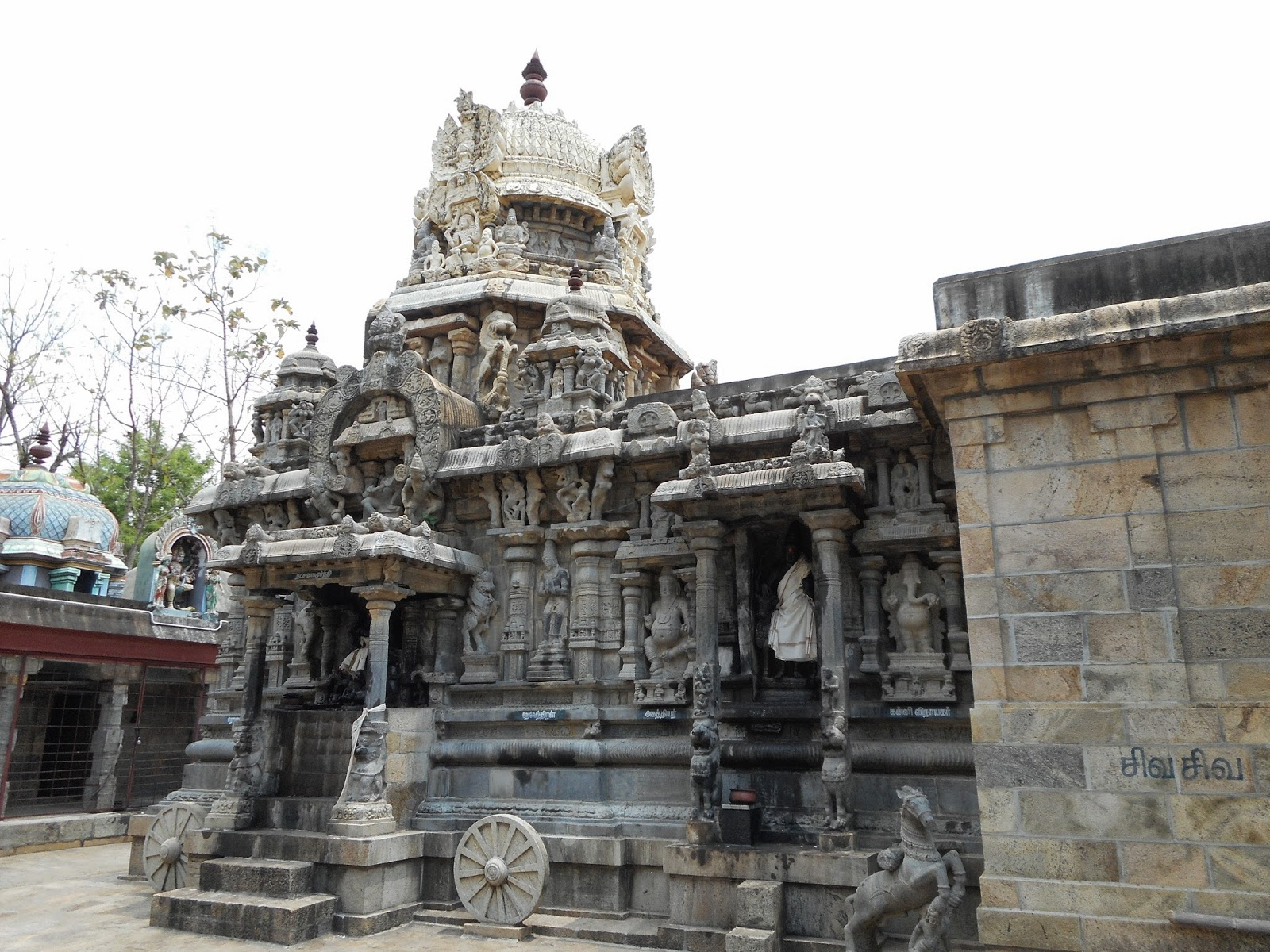

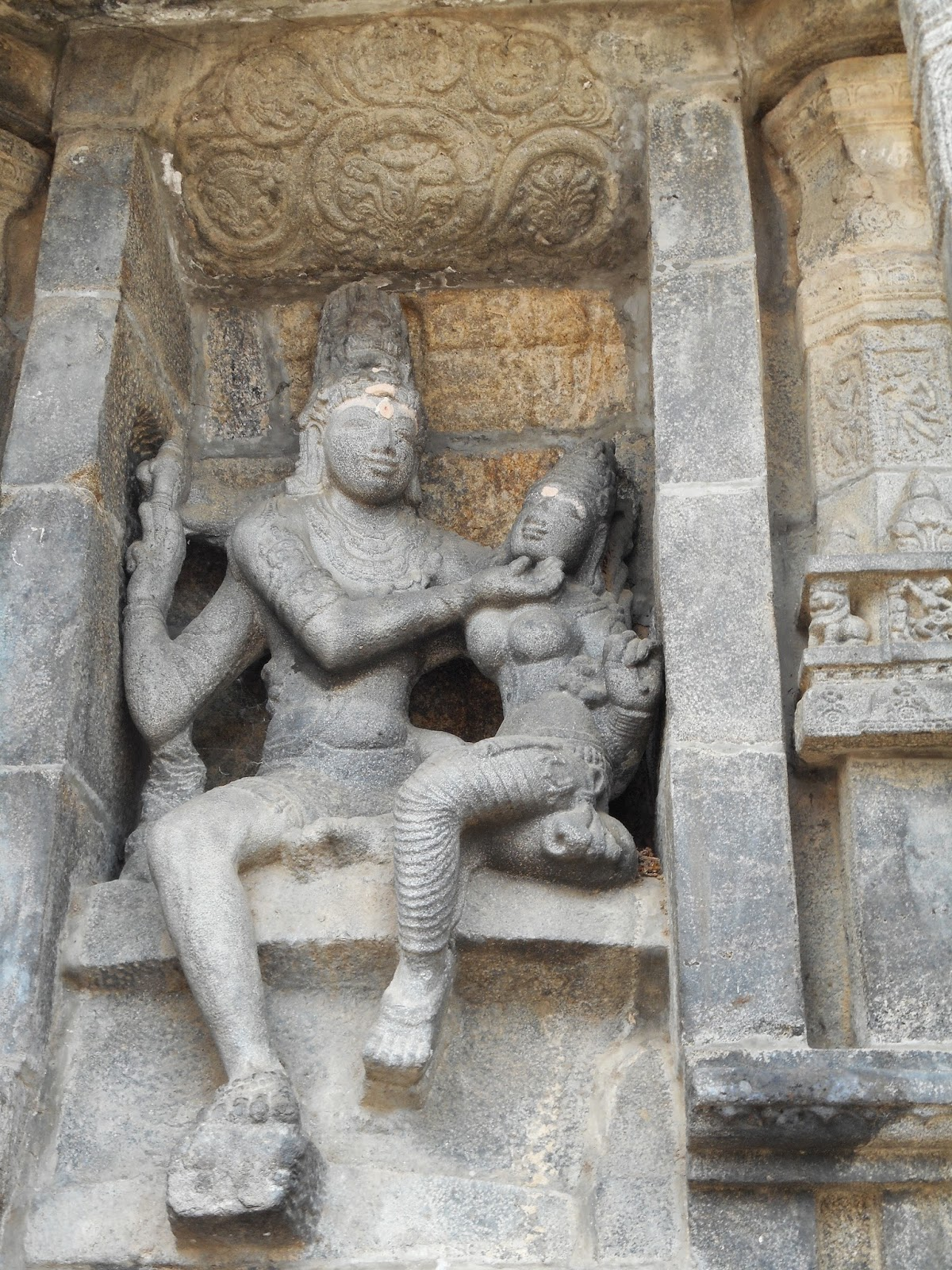

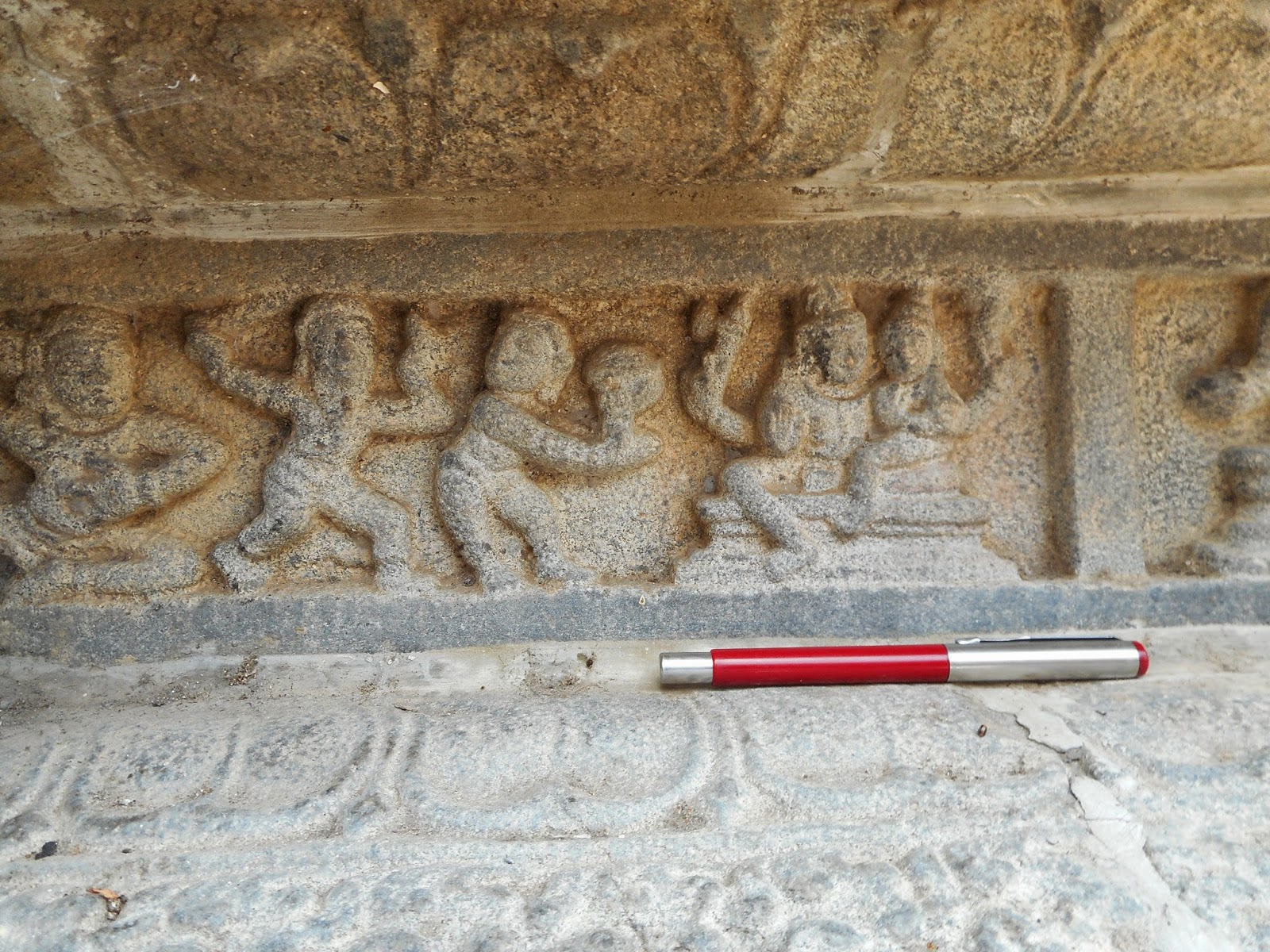

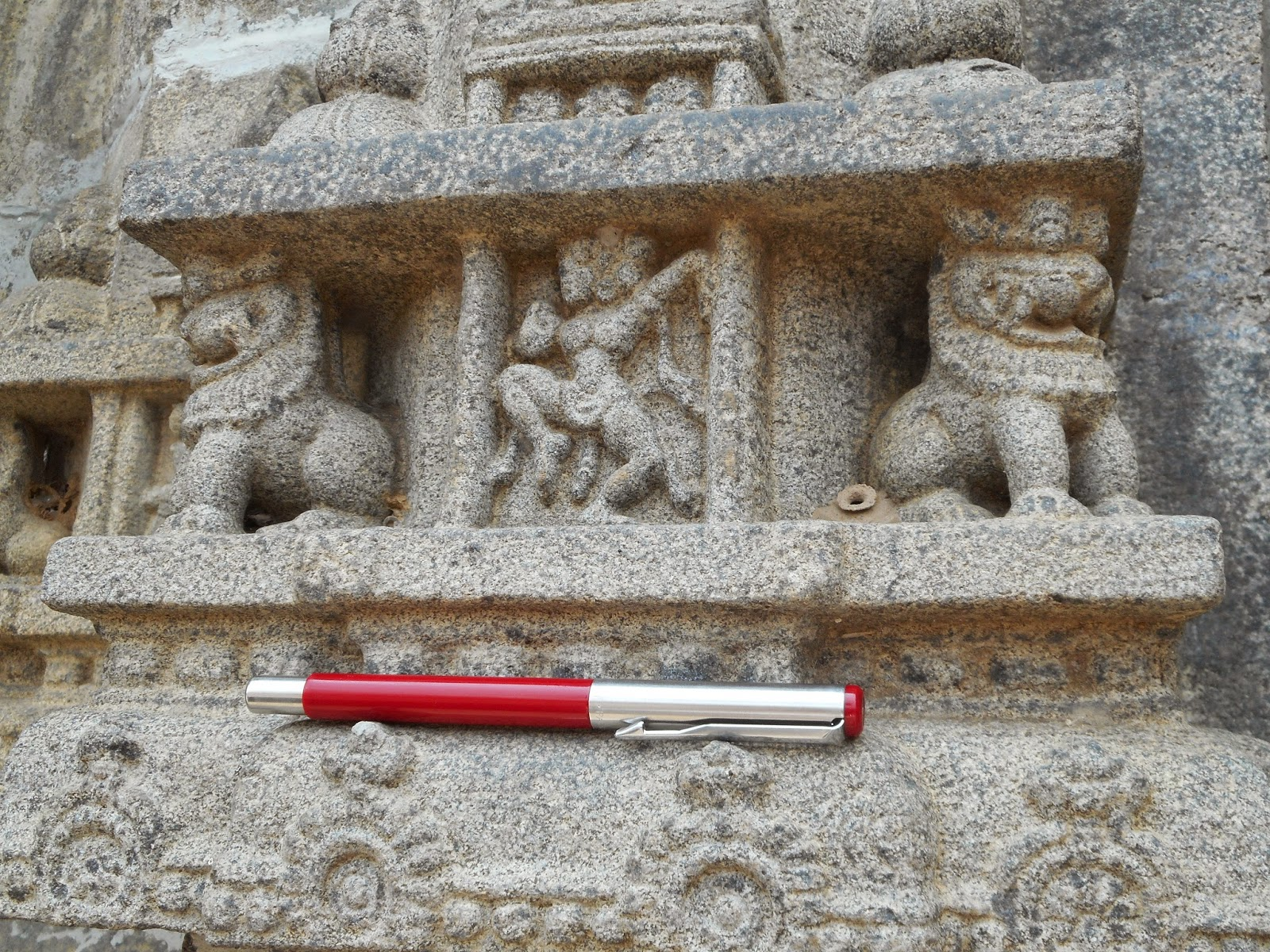

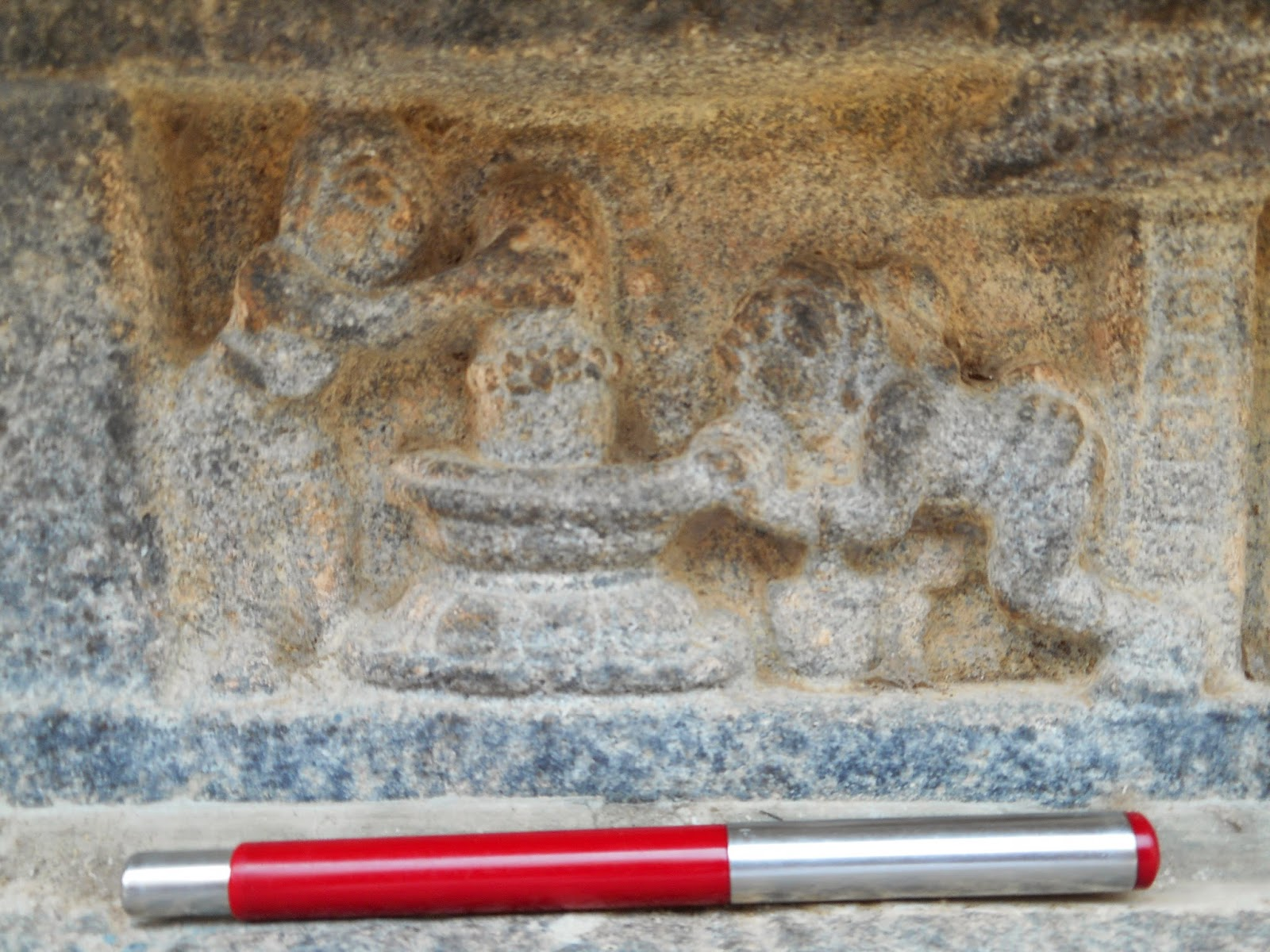

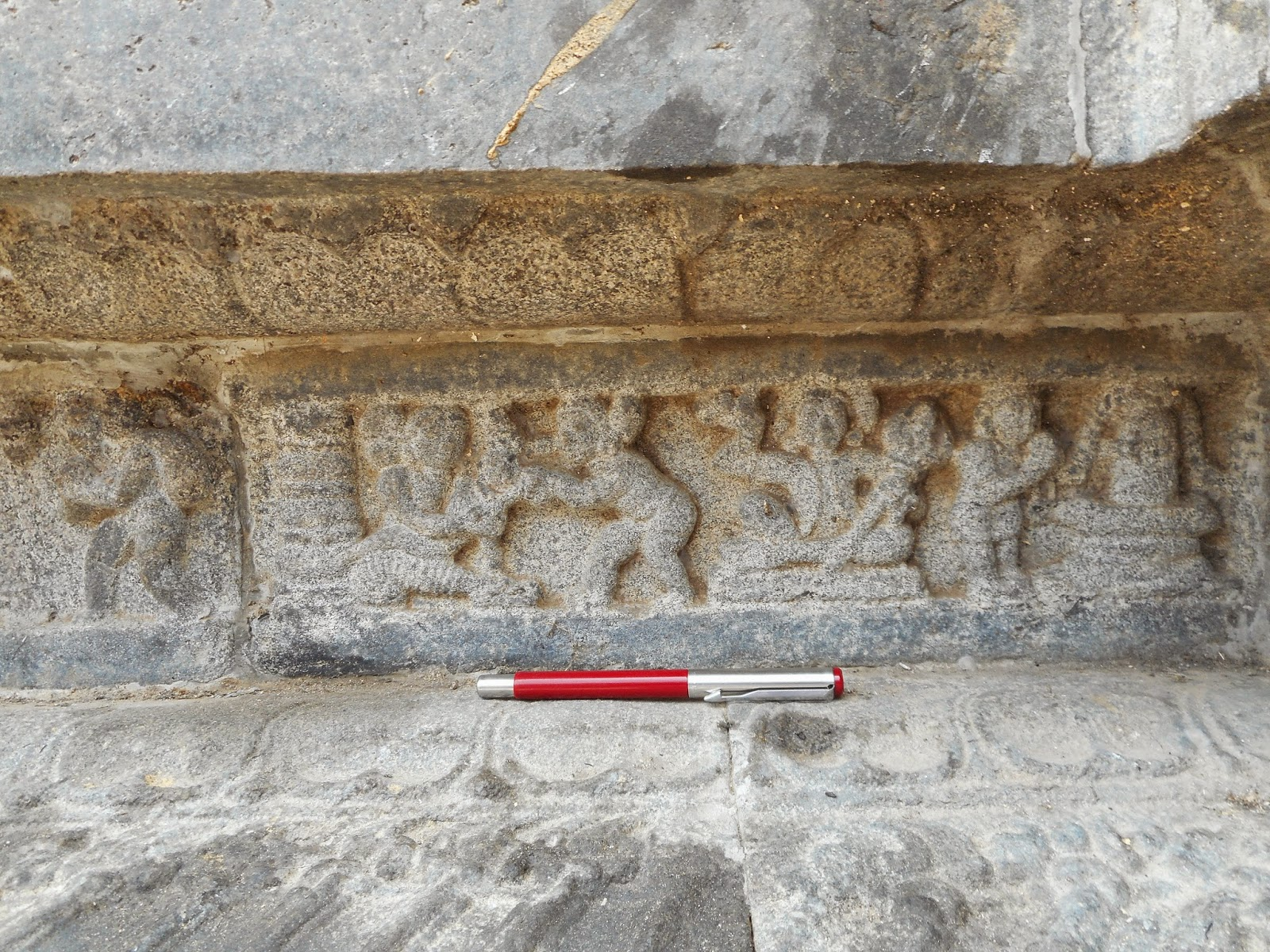

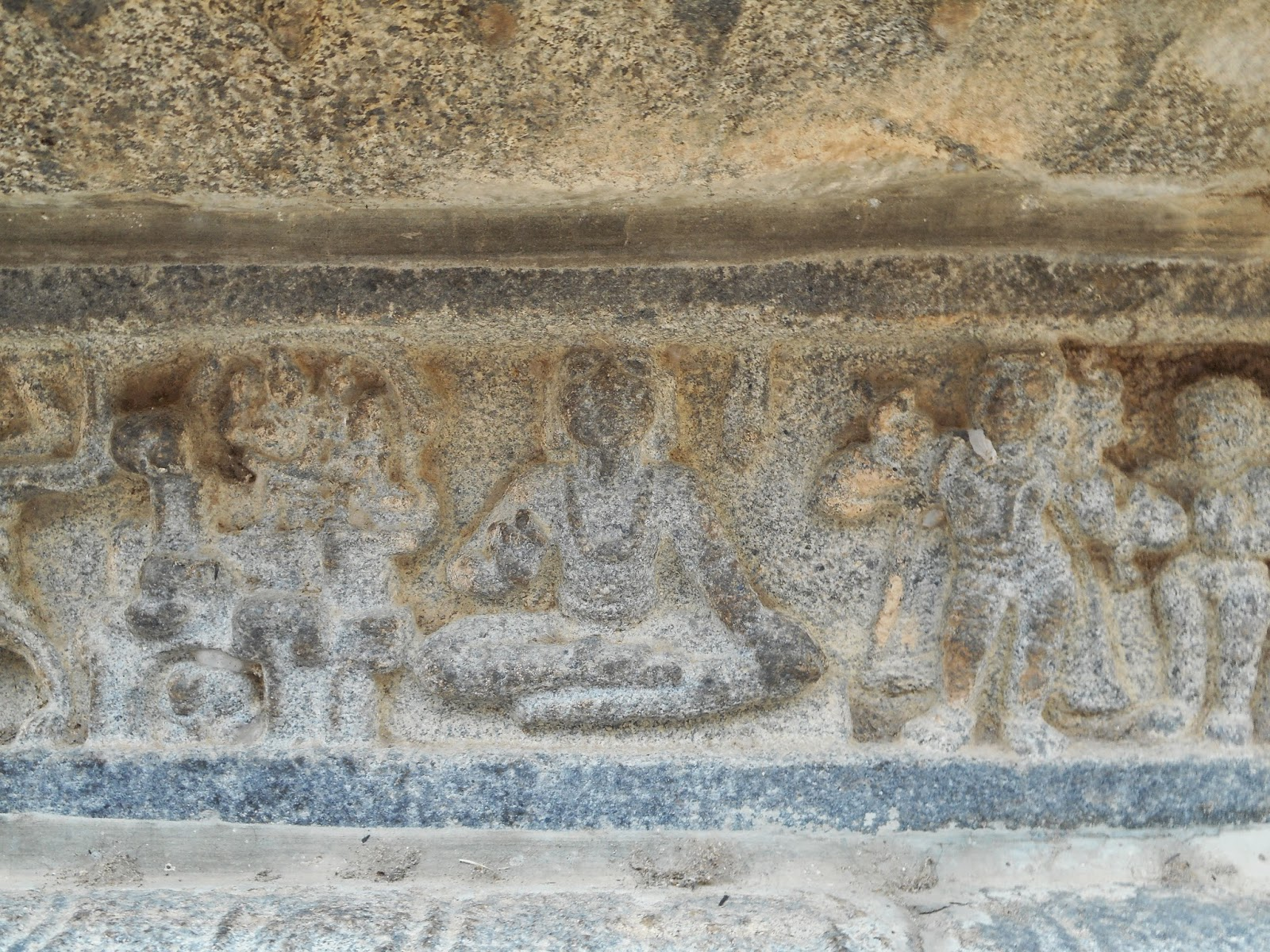

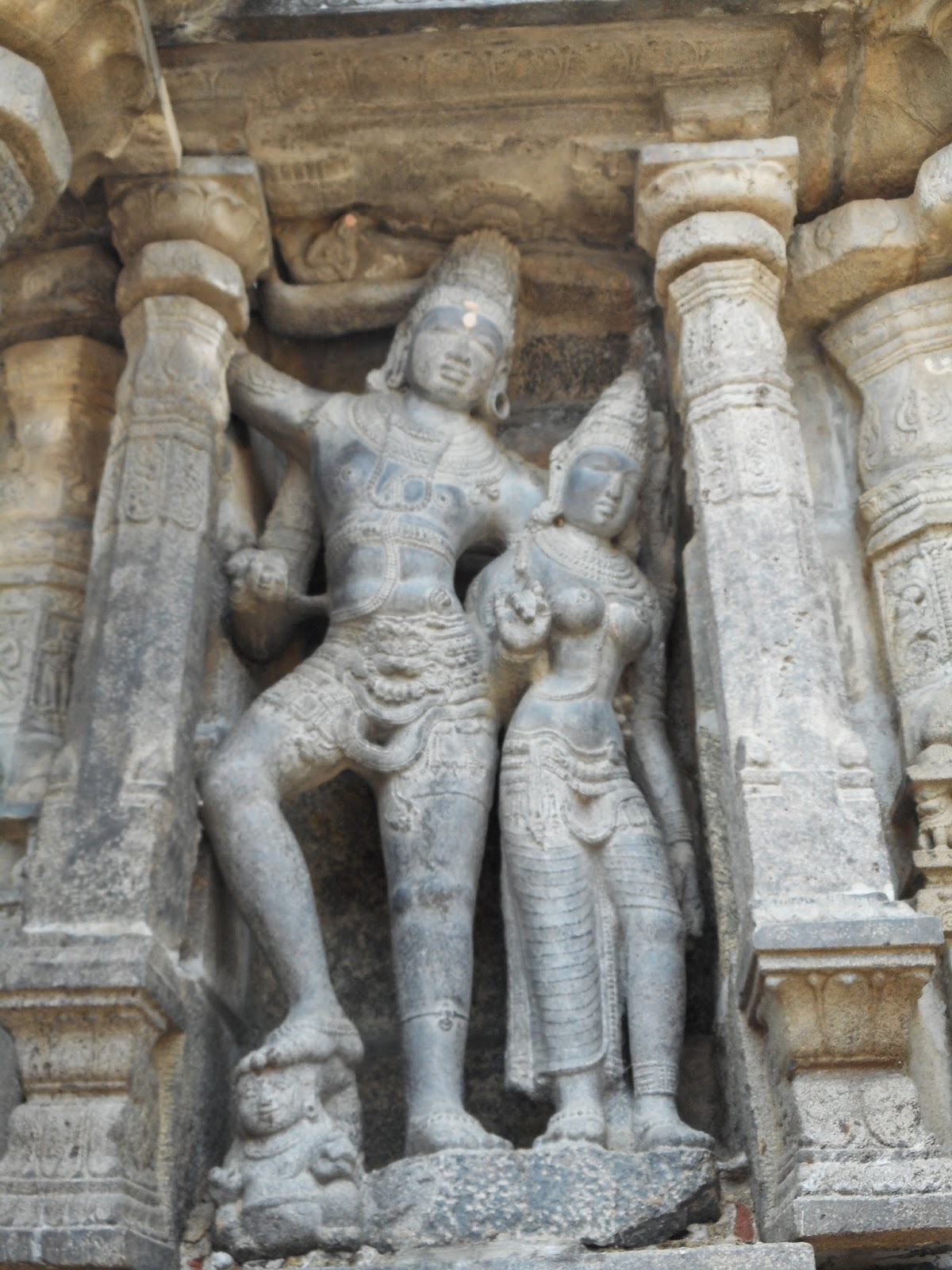

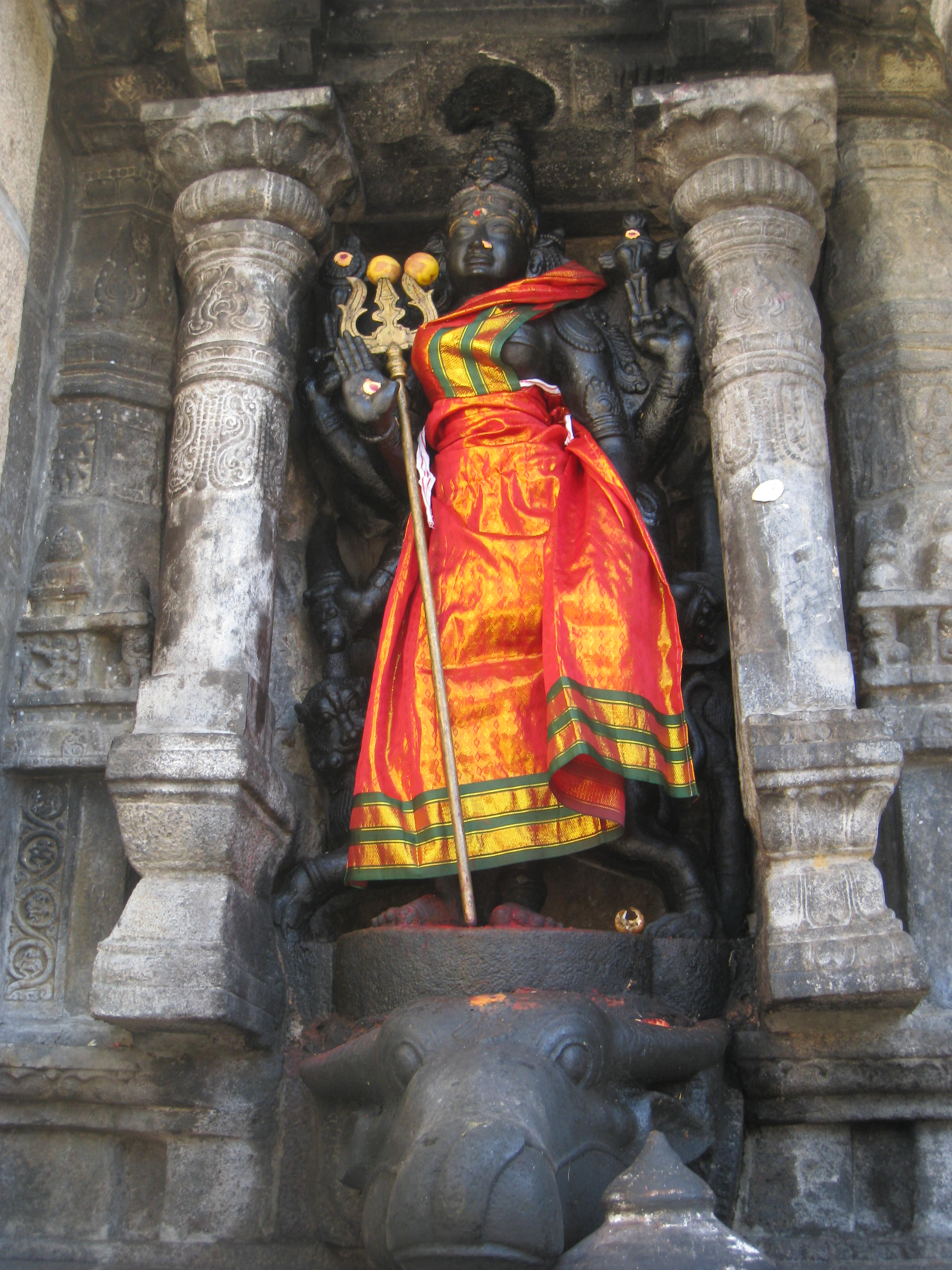
Statue of Goddess Durga

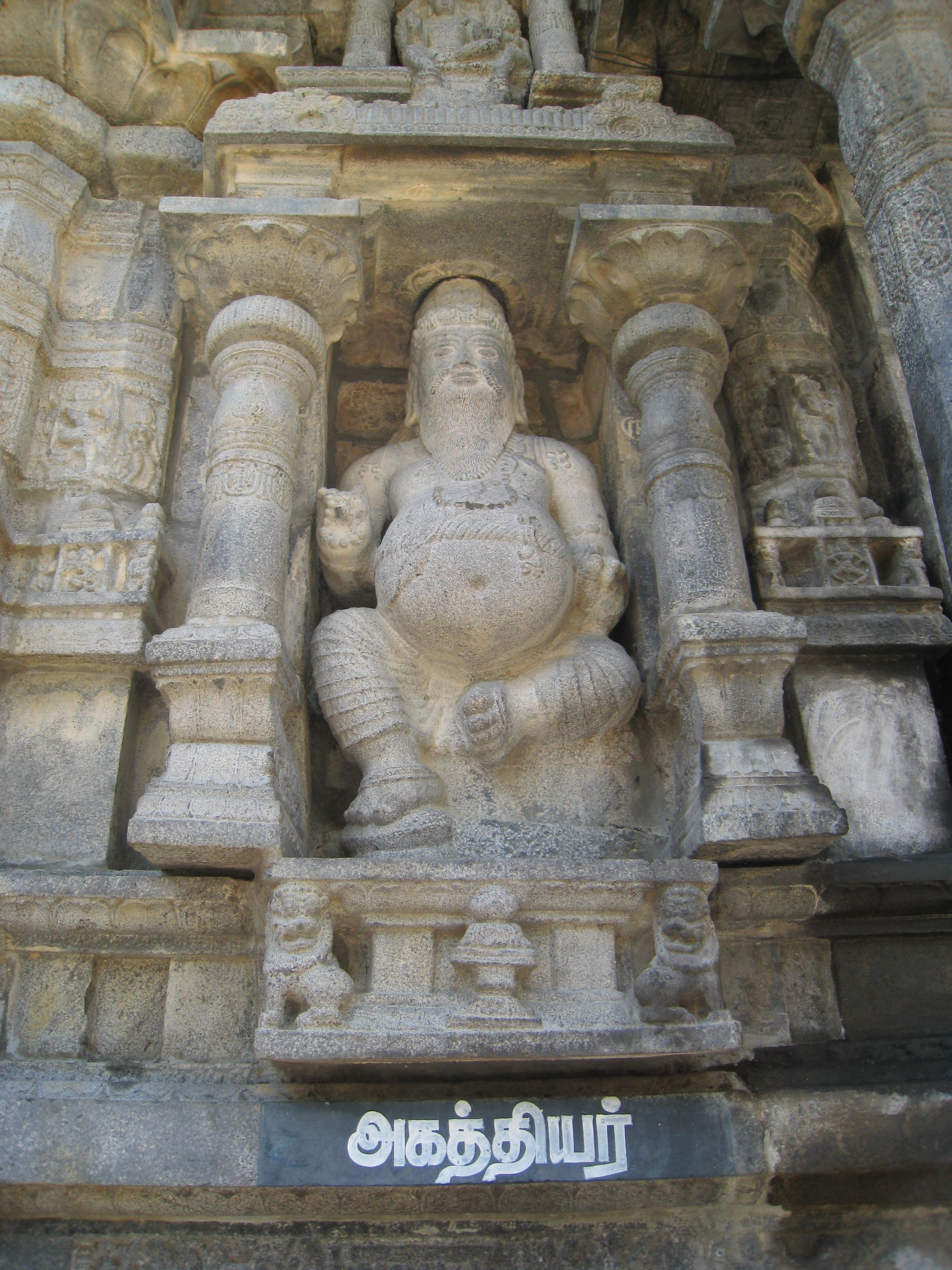
Sculpture of sage Agastya

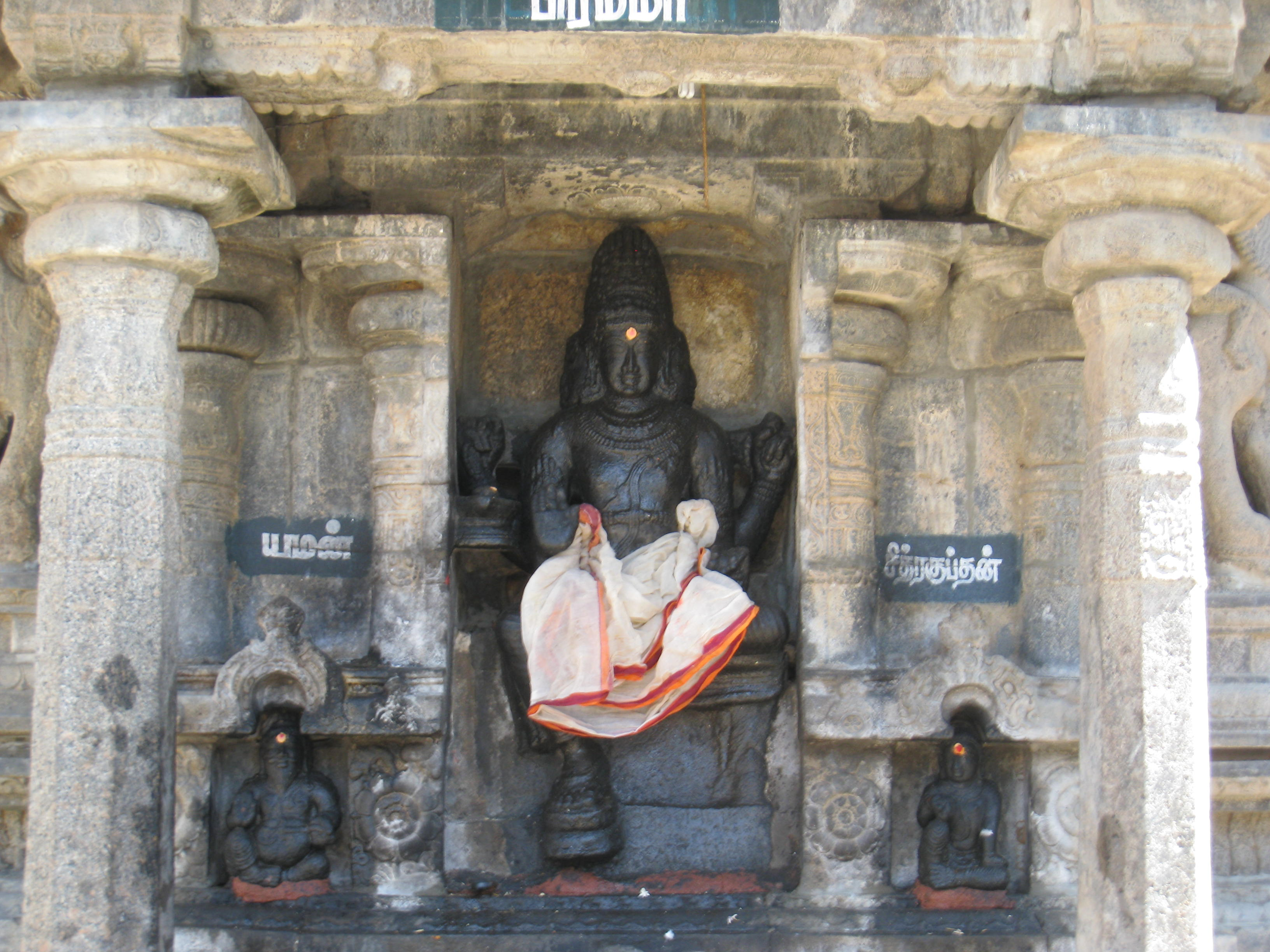
Sculpture of Brahma flanked by Yama and Chitragupta
