= Melakadambur =

Melakadambur Kadambur
- village
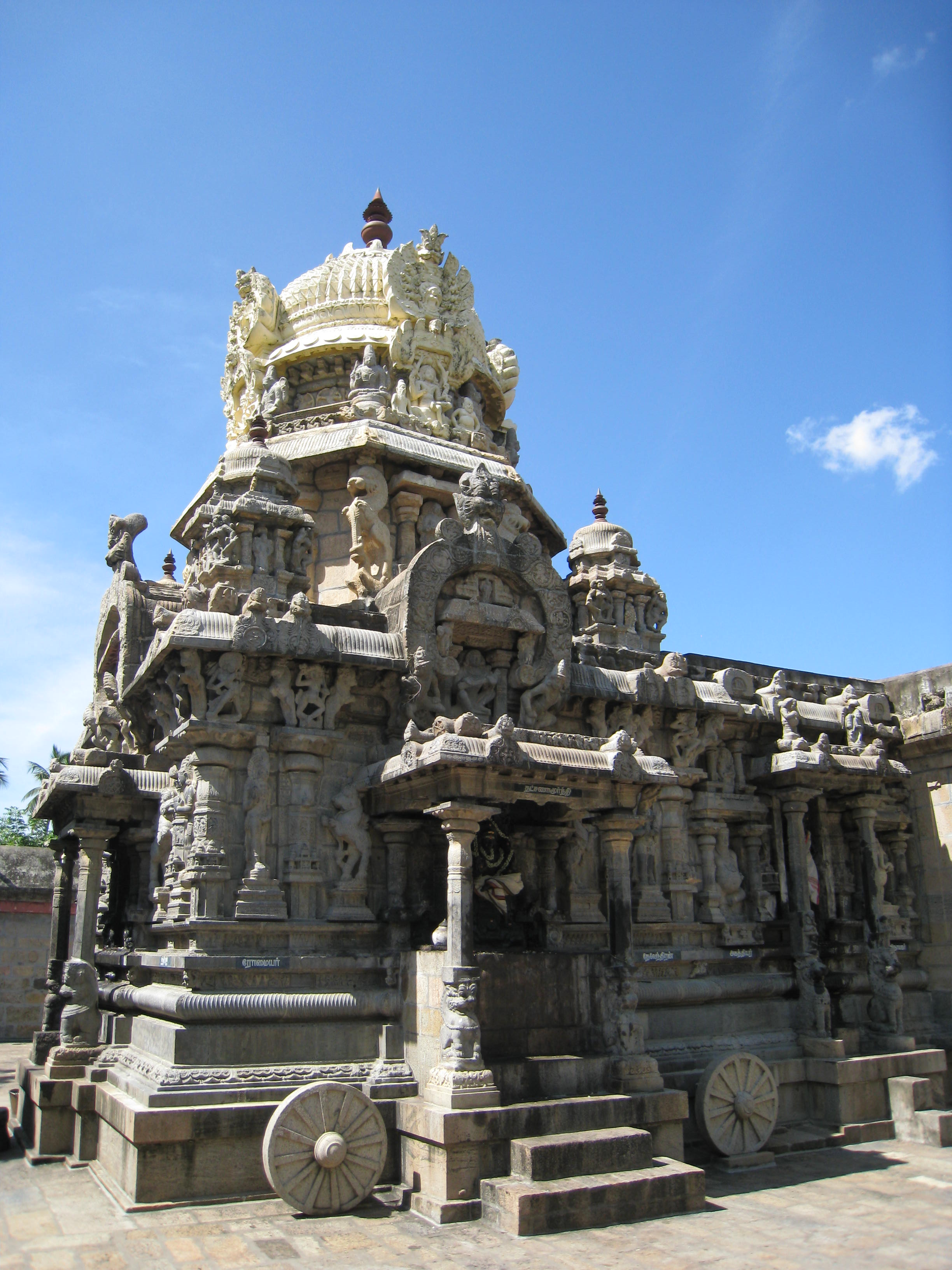
- Amirthakadeswarar Temple

- Location in Tamil Nadu, India Melakadambur (India)
- Coordinates: 11.14°N 79.31°E
- Country: India
- State: Tamil Nadu
- District: Cuddalore

Area
  - Total: 5 km^{2} (1.9 sq mi)
- Elevation: 5 m (16 ft)

Population (2008)
  - Total: 2,000 approx.
  - Density: 160/km^{2} (410/sq mi)

Languages
  - Official: Tamil
- Time zone: UTC+5:30 (IST)
- PIN: 608304
- Telephone code: 04144 std
- Vehicle registration: TN-31
- Nearest city: Chidambaram
- Sex ratio: 1:1 ♂/♀
- Literacy: 50%
- Lok Sabha constituency: Chidambaram
- Vidhan Sabha constituency: Kattumannarkoil
- Climate: as on plain (Köppen)

Melakadambur is a village located 31 kilometres (19 mi) from Chidambaram, and can reach at 6 km from Kattumannarkoil, Cuddalore district, Tamil Nadu, India. It is known for Arulmigu Amirthakateshwarar Thirukkoil temple, constructed during the reign of Cholas by Kulottunga I. The temple and the village are well known in Ponniyin Selvan history, as they are more than 1,000 years old. The Sivan temple at Melakadambur is a Paadal Petra Sthalam. This Sivalinga is self-manifested or Swayambhu Linga.

== Ponniyin Selvan ==
Ponniyin Selvan is a historical novel written by Tamil writer Kalki Krishnamurthy, from Tamil Nadu, who is also known as Krishnamurthy. This historical novel appeared in serial in the Tamil weekly Kalki, in the name of the author, many times and attracted many readers.

== Devara shrine ==
It is a Devara shrine of north shored Kaveri river. There are 63 shrines along the North bank of River Kaveri, including Melakadambur that lists as the 34th. The well known Nalvar praised the Lord of this shrine and made three pathigams on him. Also, Arunagirinathar, Vannacharabamn Thandapani Swamigal, and Vallalar came here to sing in praise of this Lord. In every yuga, some Devas visited this place to worship this Lord Amirthakadeswara. In Treta Yuga, Surya, Chandra, Indira, Romarishi, Ashtaparvathas and Parvatharajan came to worship. In Kali Yuga, Pathanjali came to worship this sthala.

== Karakkoil ==
There are nine types of Hindu temple structures. Amongst them, Karakkoil also called Mela Kadambur Amirthakadeswarar Temple is a structure that the vimana is in chariot like structure. The structure is pulled by horses looks an enchanting appearance.

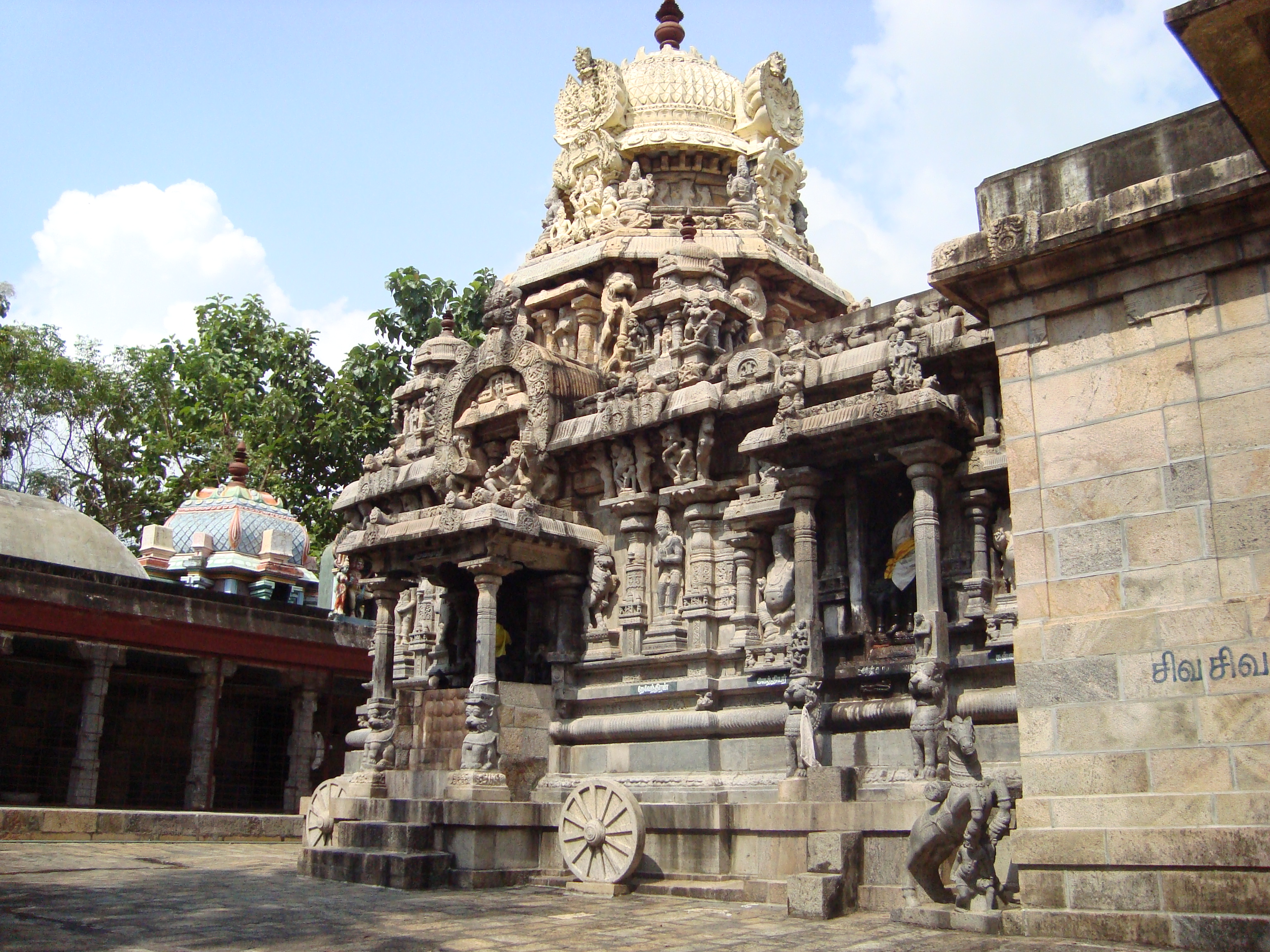
Karakkoil

This Karakkoil was built by emperor Kulottunga Chola I in the year 1113 AD, the king's 43rd governing year. This temple is like a chariot like structure with two horses pulling the car or Ratha. The temple is finely sculptured with many purana stories like Ramayan, Krishna Leela, Nayanmar stories and other stories of siva.

The basement is called Adhittanam this temples adhittanam is laid of 18 layered adittanam called pathmaga pandham, and manjapathram.

== Sun worship ==
It is rare scene to view. During the 3rd, 4th, 5th day of the Tamil month of Panguni, twelfth month of the Tamil calendar, early during sunrise at 6:15 am, the Sun's rays will fall on Lord Amirthakateshwara Lingam for about fifteen minutes. At that time special poojas are offered to the Lord. The shrine Goddess Jothiminnammai seems as Kalaimagal in morning and Thirumagal in evening and Malaimagal in night.

== Vinayaka ==
When Narasimhavarma Pallavan won the war on Chalukya, a Ganapati statue was brought from the Chalukyan capital of Vatapi — by Sirutondar. Like that, cholas made a war towards Ganga region by the King Rajendra I at that time and they took the Ganapathy statue and Dvarabalaka statue from vengi region. While the Ganapathy statue was positioned in Kadambur temple, the Davarabalaka statue was kept in the entrance of Gangai konda cholapuram temple.

== Dasa Bhuja Rishaba Thandavamoorthy ==
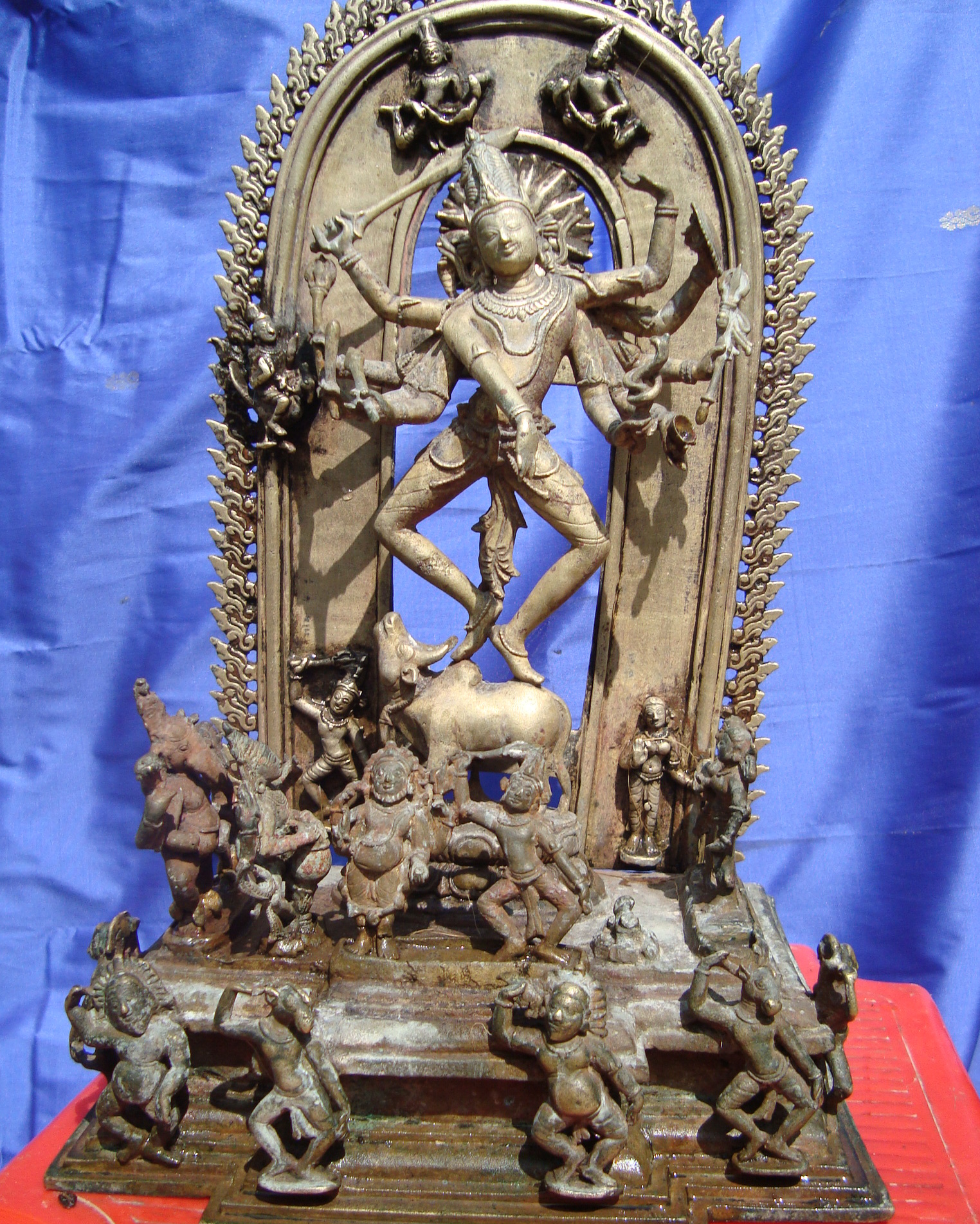
Pala dynasty image of Nataraja

A special idol kept in this temple, called Dasa Bhuja Rishaba Thandavamoorthy, depicts Lord Shiva dancing on a bull with all ten hands spread and holding weapons, with all Devas surrounding his feet. This is believed to be a Pala dynasty idol that came to Tamil Nadu-Melakadambur along with victorious King Rajendra Chola I of the Bengal war. After Rajendra this idol has been kept in this Melakadambur temple built by the king Kulothunga I, who donated this idol and some Vidangars in 1110 AD. Devotees can see this idol only on Pradosha days.

Kadamba tree

The Kadambu tree is the sthala vriksha of the Siva temple situated here. This village is named as Kadambur because of the Kadambu tree, named in botany as Neolamarckia cadamba of Rubiaceae family. This Kadambur then bifurcated into Melakadambur and Keezhakadambur.

== Festivals of this village ==
This village was called as Thirukkadambur in 6th–19th century. We can know this by means of the padhigams of Thirunavukkarasar and Thirugnanasambandar nayanmars. Every month festivals being celebrated in good manner.

1. Chithirai—Tamil varuda pirappu, Nataraja abishegam Thirunavukarasar guru pooja

2. Vaikasi - Visaga uthsavam for Murugan, Thirugnanasambandar gurupooja

3. Aani - Aani Thirumanjanam, Manickavasaga gurupooja

4. Aadi - Amman Abishegam in pooram, Sundarar gurupooj

5. Avani - Vinayagar Chathurthi

6. Purattasi - Navaraththiri

7. Aippasi - Kandhasashti, Thirukkalyanam

8. Karthigai - 108 sangabishegam in somavaram

9. Margazhi - Thirupalliyezhuchi in early morning

10. Thai - Pongal pooja magarasangranthi

11. Maasi - Mahasivarathri

12. Panguni—Sooriya pooja on 3,4,5 at early sunrise

== Dakshinamurthy ==
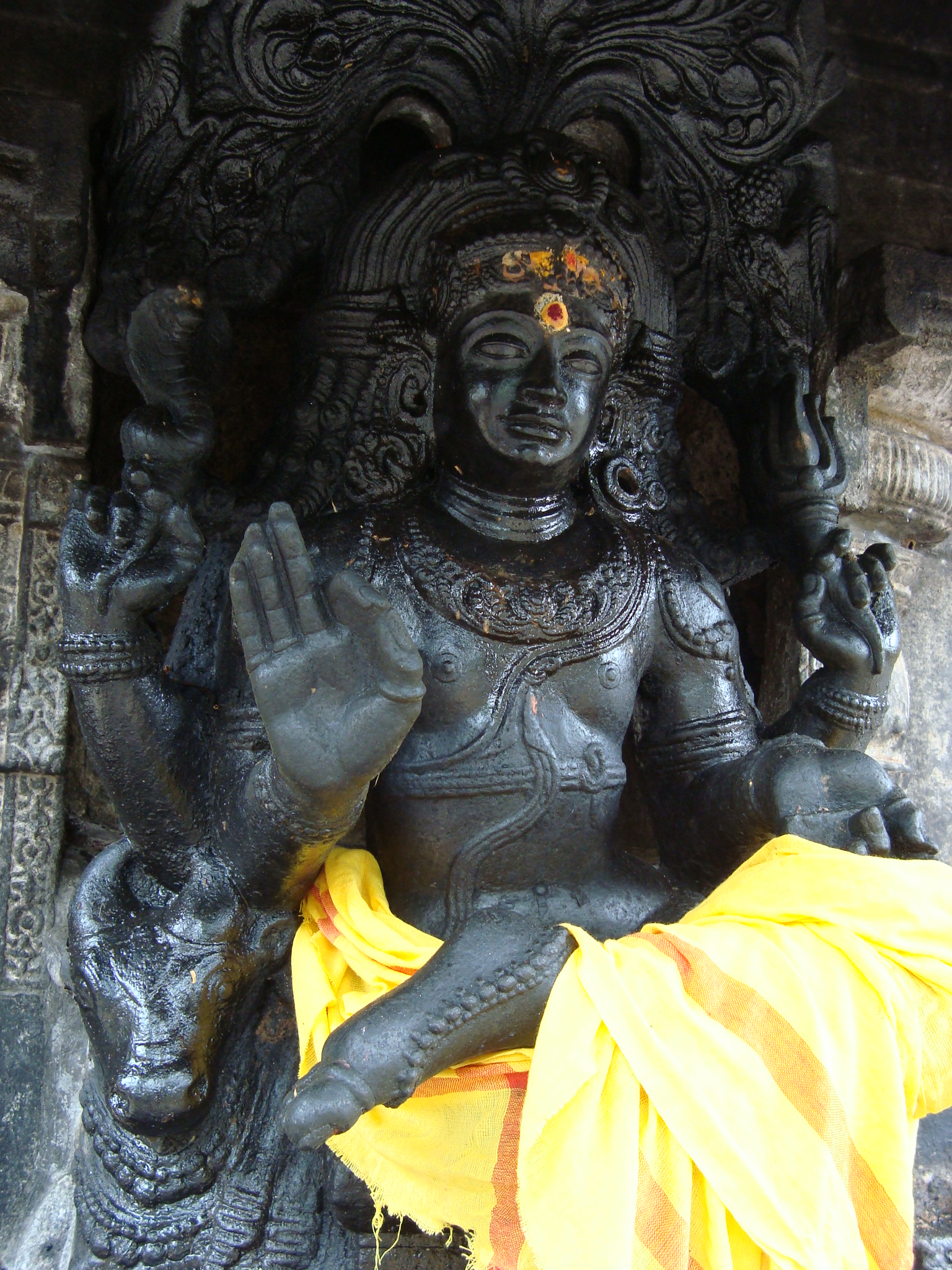
Dakshinamurthy

In Kadambur temple the moolasthanam is made up as a chariot-like structure. On that structure's south side is a stone statue of Dakshinamurthy who is sitting on a bull below a banyan tree. The beauty of this sculpture is a hole that extends from the left ear to the right ear.
