= Sakkottai, Thanjavur district =

Sakkottai
- neighbourhood
- Location in Tamil Nadu, India Sakkottai (India)
- Coordinates: 10.93°N 79.4°E
- Country: India
- State: Tamil Nadu
- District: Thanjavur
- Taluk: Kumbakonam

Population (2001)
  - Total: 2,889

Languages
  - Official: Tamil
- Time zone: UTC+5:30 (IST)
- PIN: 612401
- Telephone code: 0435

Sakkottai is a neighbourhood of Kumbakonam Municipal Corporation of Thanjavur district, Tamil Nadu, India. The neighbourhood is famous for the Amirthakadeswarar Temple. Popular Indian historian S. Krishnaswami Aiyangar and Manimekalai Sukumar Mudaliyar hailed from Sakkottai. In older days it was known as "Savvukottai".

== Demographics ==
According to the 2001 census, Sakkottai had a population of 2,889, of whom 1,437 were males and 1,452 females, 301 of whom were under six years of age. Sakkottai had a sex ratio of 1,010. Sakkottai had a literacy rate of 70.22. The male literacy rate was 79.37 while the female literacy rate was 64.66. The village had a scheduled caste population of 790 and a scheduled tribe population of 4.

== Prominent personalities ==
- Sakkottai Krishnaswami Aiyangar: Indian historian and Dravidologist.
