= Virudhagiriswarar temple =

Temple in Tamil Nadu, India

Pazhamalai Nadhar Temple
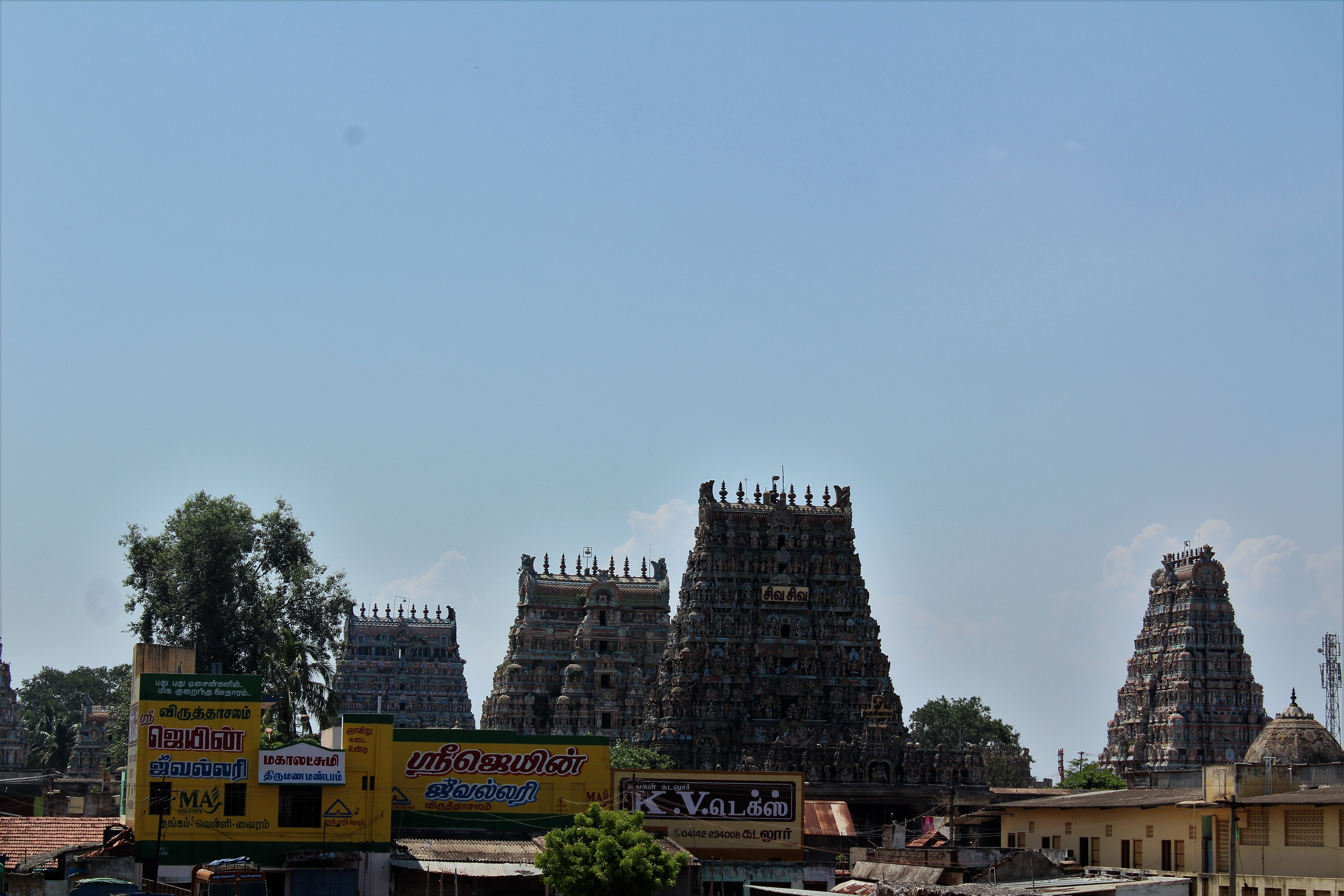

- Location in Tamil Nadu

Religion
- Affiliation: Hinduism
- Deity: Pazhamalai Nadhar(shiva)

Location
- Location: Virudhachalam, Tamil Nadu, India
- State: Tamil Nadu
- Country: India
- Coordinates: 11.30°N 79.20°E

Architecture
- Type: Dravidian architecture
- Creator: Chola Queen Sembiyan Mahadevi

The Pazhamalai Nadhar Temple is a Hindu temple in the town of Virudhachalam, Cuddalore district of Tamil Nadu, India. The presiding deity PazhamalaiNadhar is revered in Tevaram, written by Tamil saint poets known as the nayanmars and classified as Paadal Petra Sthalam. The temple gives its name to the town of Virudhachalam. The temple is famed for the legend of Shiva forming as a mountain heeding to the prayers of Brahma.

Pazhamalai Nadhar Temple is a part of the series of temples built by Sembiyan Mahadevi, the Chola queen along the banks of river Kaveri. It has several inscriptions dating back to the Chola period. The temple has six daily rituals at various times from 5:30 a.m. to 8 p.m., and three yearly festivals on its calendar. The annual Brahmotsavam (prime festival), Masi Magam, is attended by thousands of devotees from far and near. The temple is maintained and administered by the Hindu Religious and Endowment Board of the Government of Tamil Nadu.

== Etymology ==
Actual temple name is Pazhamalai Nadhar Temple during Vijayanagar period it was changed to new name Vriddha means ancient – Achalam means the unshakeable, so the hills around Virudhachalam are the unshakeable hills. Virudhachalam means an ancient hill. In chaste Tamil this is mentioned as Mudhu Kundram in Thevaram hymns. During the days of Saivite Saints Appar, Gnanasambandhar and Sundarar, the place was known as Pazhamalai in Tamil and changed to the Sanskrit version Virudhachalam in the days that followed.

== Architecture ==
The ancient Chola temple of Virudhagiriswarar was commissioned by Sembiyan Mahadevi, among the most powerful queens of the Chola empire and an ardent worshipper of Lord Siva. The temple is surrounded by high walls and five gopurams. The hundred pillared hall is carved like a chariot. There are images of Vinayaga, Rishi Vpiacit and Romas and for the sister of Kubera. The chains of the temple car were donated by Charles Hyde, the District Collector of the then South Arcot district in 1813. The place was originally called Thirumudukundram, the place of holy mountain. Similar architecture of halls (Mandapas) simulating a chariot drawn by elephant or horses is found in Sarangapani temple at Kumbakonam, Mela Kadambur Amirthakadeswarar Temple, Sikharagiriswara Temple, Kudumiyamalai, Nageswaraswamy Temple, Kumbakonam, and Thyagaraja Temple, Tiruvarur.

== Religious importance ==
Number five has a significance in this temple. Murthis are five – Vinayaka, Muruga, Shiva, Shakthi and Chandikeswara. Virudagiriswarar is praised by five names – Virudhagireeshwarar, Pazhamalai Nathar, Vruddhachaleswarar, Mudhu Kundreeswarar and Vruddhagiri. There are five Vinayakas in the temple – Aazhathu Vinayakar, Mattru Uraitha Vinayaka, Muppillayar, Dasabhuja Ganapathy and Vallabha Ganapathi. Five Rishis had the darshan of Virudhagiriswarar – Romesa, Vibasiddhu, Kumaradeva, Nada Sharma and Anavardhini. There five towers in the temple at east, west, south, north and Kandarathithan (a Chola king) gopuram. There are five prakaras – called Thiruchutru in Tamil They are Kailaya, Vanniyadi, 63 Nayanmar Chuttru and Panchavarna Chuttru. There are five Kodimarams - flag post with five Nandhis – Indra Nandhi, Vedha Nandhi, Athma Nandhi, Maalvidai Nandhi and Dharma Nandhi. There are five inner Mandaps – Artha, Idaikazhi, Thapana, Maha and Isai Mandapams. Outer Mandapams are 20 pillar mandapam, Deeparadhana, 100 pillar mandapam, Vipachithu and Chitra mandapam. Five-time puja is followed in the temple - Thiruvanandal, Kalasanthi, Uchi Kala, Sayaraksha and Arthajama at scheduled times from early morning till night. The temple has five cars-Raths for Vinayaka, Muruga, Pazhamalai Nathar, Mother Periyanayagi and Sri Chandikeswara. The place has five names – Tirumudhu Kundram, Vruddha Kasi, Virudhachalam, Nerkuppai and Mudhugiri.

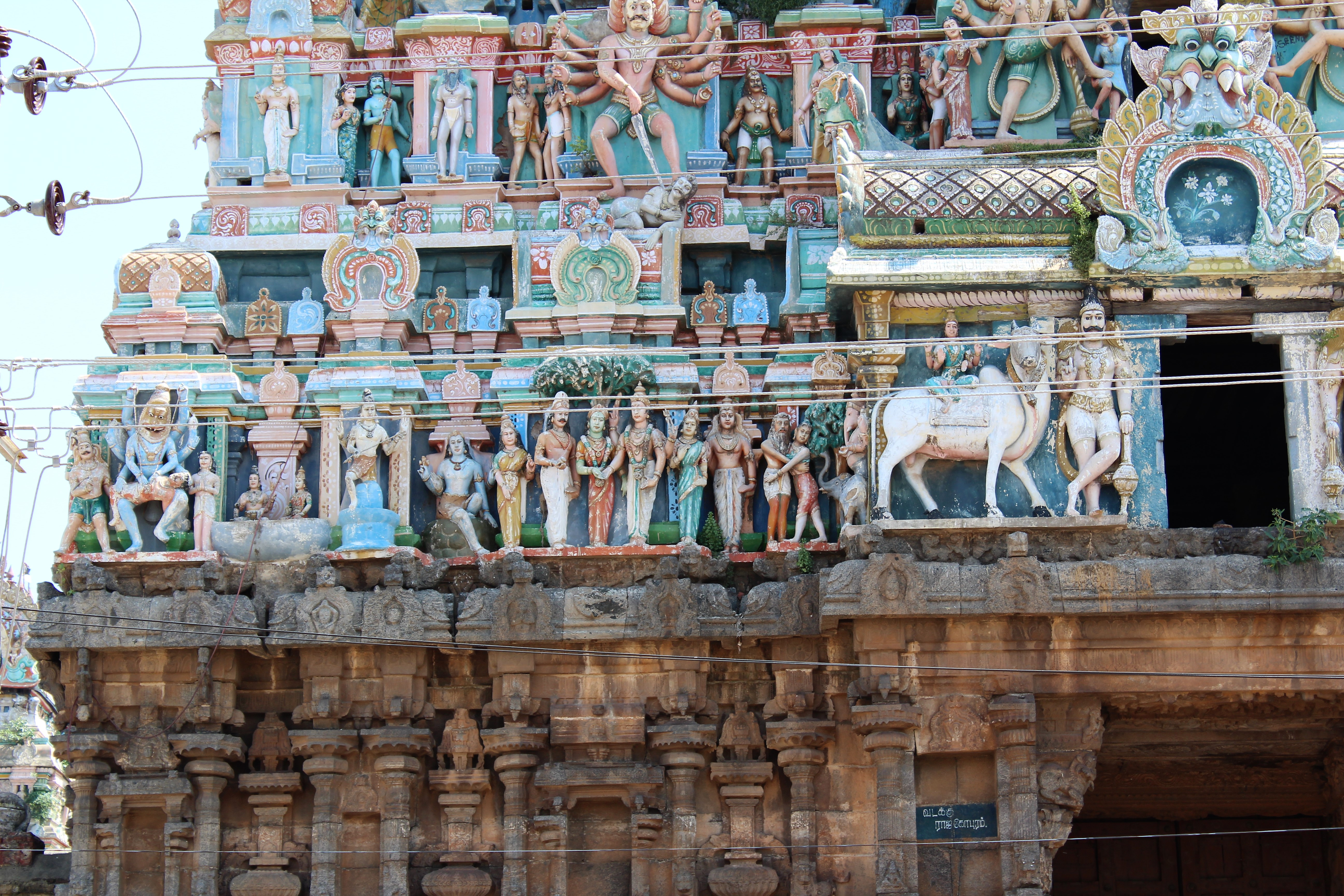
Legend of the temple

It is one of the places giving salvation to the departed. It is even considered holier than Holy Kasi i.e. Varanasi. As believed in Kasi, here too Mother Viruthambigai places the departed souls on her lap and fan them with the pallu of her Sari while Shiva chants the Namasivaya mantra in the ears of the dead ensuring his/her salvation. Hence in olden days people of Virudhachalam never bothered to undertake a pilgrimage to Varanasi when they become old and weak. As a result, this place is also come to known as Virudhakasi. It is also claimed that the benefit measure is a little bit more here than Kasi, hence the saying “Kasiyil Veesam Adhigam in Virudhakasi”. The ashes of the dead when dissolved in Manimuthar River change into a stone and stay underneath, according to Sthalapuranam. Shiva as Nataraja danced in Thillai for a contest. He played here for his own joy.

During his visit to this place, the king of Karnataka suffered due to hunger. Mother Peria Nayaki, as a young woman fed him with milk and named him Kumara Deva.

Viruthambigai means Goddess of elderly age. Devotee Guru Namshivayar stayed in this place for a night on his way to Chidambaram. He was very hungry and called Mother with a verse with a word Kizhavi. Mother Periyanayagi came there as an old woman and replied that Kizhavi-old woman cannot bring food, only young woman can. The devotee sang another verse describing the youthfulness of Ambica. She appeared as a young beautiful woman and fed the devotee and thus came to be known as Balambika – young Mother.

The consecration of the temple was performed on 7 February 2022.

== Idol Theft ==
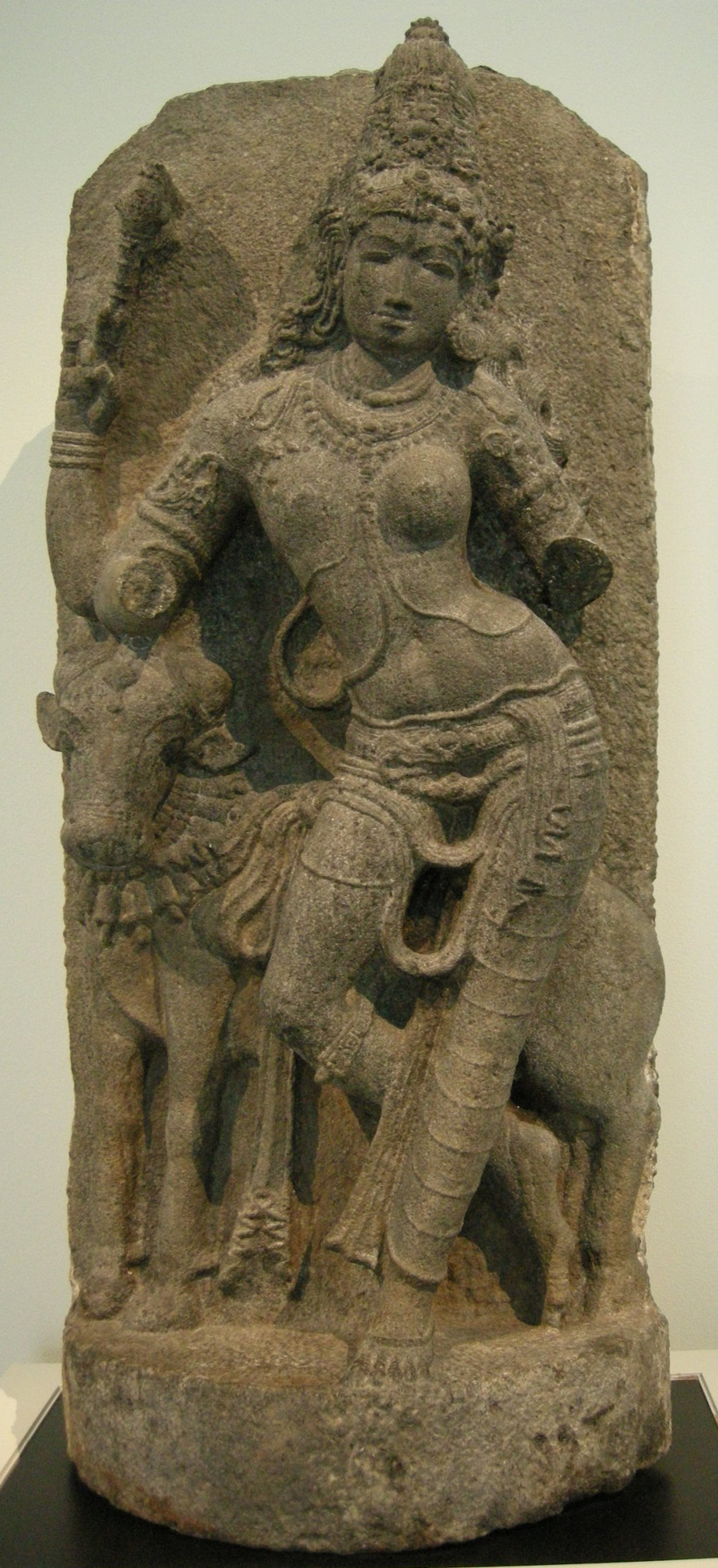
Stolen Ardhanarisvara

A total of 6 stone sculptures, including that of a Ardhanarisvara belonging to the temple were believed to be stolen and smuggled abroad sometime after 1974 (documented photographic evidence from French Institute of Pondicherry). The Idol Wing of the Tamil Nadu Criminal Investigation Department (IW-CID) has traced it to the Art Gallery of New South Wales in Australia and successfully repatriated the Ardhanarisvara sculpture in 2014 and the Pratyangira sculpture in 2017.

S.No.	Deity	Stolen Idol traced to	Country	Current status	More Details
1	Ardhanarisvara	Art Gallery of New South Wales	Australia	Recovered	
2	Pratyangira / Narasimmee	National Gallery of Australia	Australia	Recovered	
3	Pillaiyar			Unknown	
4	Itchasakthi			Unknown	
5	Gnanasakthi			Unknown	
6	Kriyasakthi			Unknown	
