= Mahendravarman =

Mahendravarman is a royal title bestowed on rulers of Hindu kingdoms:

- Mahendravarman (Varman dynasty) (reigned 470–494), king of Kamarupa, India
- Mahendravarman (Chenla) (reigned 590-611), king of Chenla, modern day Cambodia
- Mahendravarman I (600–630), Pallava king of South India
- Mahendravarman II (reigned 668–672), Pallava king and grandson of Mahendravarman I

== See also ==
- Mahindra (disambiguation)
- Varman (disambiguation)
