= Kailasanathar Temple, Melakaveri =

Indian temple

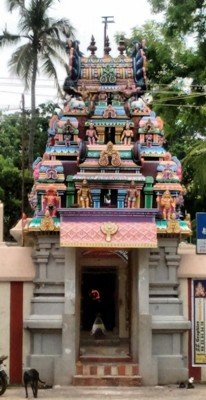
Rajagopura

Kailasanathar Temple is a Shiva located at Melakaveri near Kumbakonam, in Thanjavur district, Tamil Nadu, India.

It is one of the Saptha Stana Temples of Kumbakonam. During the Mahahaman of 2016 the palanquin festival was held on 7 February 2016. Following the tirttavari held at Mahamaham tank on 21 April 2016, the palanquin festival of the Sapta Stana Temples were held on 23 April 2016.

The temple's consecration (Kumbhabhishekham) was on 21 March 2005 and 2 November 2015.
