= Nageswaraswamy Temple =

Temple in Tamil Nadu, India

- Kudanthai Keezhakottam
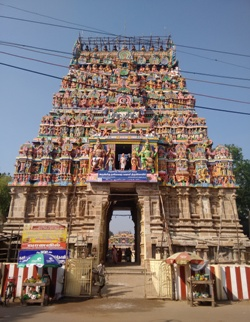

- Location in Tamil Nadu

Religion
- Affiliation: Hinduism
- District: Thanjavur
- Deity: Nageswaran (Shiva)
- Features: Temple tank: Surya Theertham

Location
- Location: Kumbakonam
- State: Tamil Nadu
- Country: India
- Coordinates: 10°57′31.4910″N 79°22′43.173″E

Architecture
- Type: Dravidian architecture
- Creator: Cholas

Nageswaraswamy Temple is a Hindu temple to Shiva in Kumbakonam in Thanjavur district, Tamil Nadu, India. The presiding deity is revered in the 7th-century Tamil Saiva canonical work, the Tevaram and is classified as Paadal Petra Sthalam. The temple is one of the earliest Chola temples. Shiva in the guise of Nagaraja, the serpent king.

There are many inscriptions associated with the temple indicating contributions from Cholas, Thanjavur Nayaks and Thanjavur Maratha kingdom. The oldest parts of the present masonry structure were built during the Chola dynasty in the 9th century, while later expansions, including the towering gopuram gatehouses, are attributed to later periods, up to the Thanjavur Nayaks during the 16th century.

The temple complex is one of the largest in the state and it houses three gateway towers known as gopurams. The temple is maintained and administered by Hindu Religious and Charitable Endowments Department of the Government of Tamil Nadu.

== Legend ==
During the time when Adisesha was feeling under the weight of the earth, he did penance at Kuvivanam. Parvathy appeared and blessed him at this place to get strength. The water body in the temple is called Naga Theertham. The temple known is for its shrine of Rahu, one of the nine celestial bodies in the Navagrahas. A legend has it that the mythological serpents Dakshan and Kaarkotakan worshipped Lord Shiva here. Legend also has it that King Nala worshipped Shiva here as in Thirunallar. There is a Naganathar temple at Tirunageswaram having similar features like temple. This place has been referred in Tevaram written by Saint Tamil poet of 7th Century CE, Thirugnana Sambanthar.

== History ==
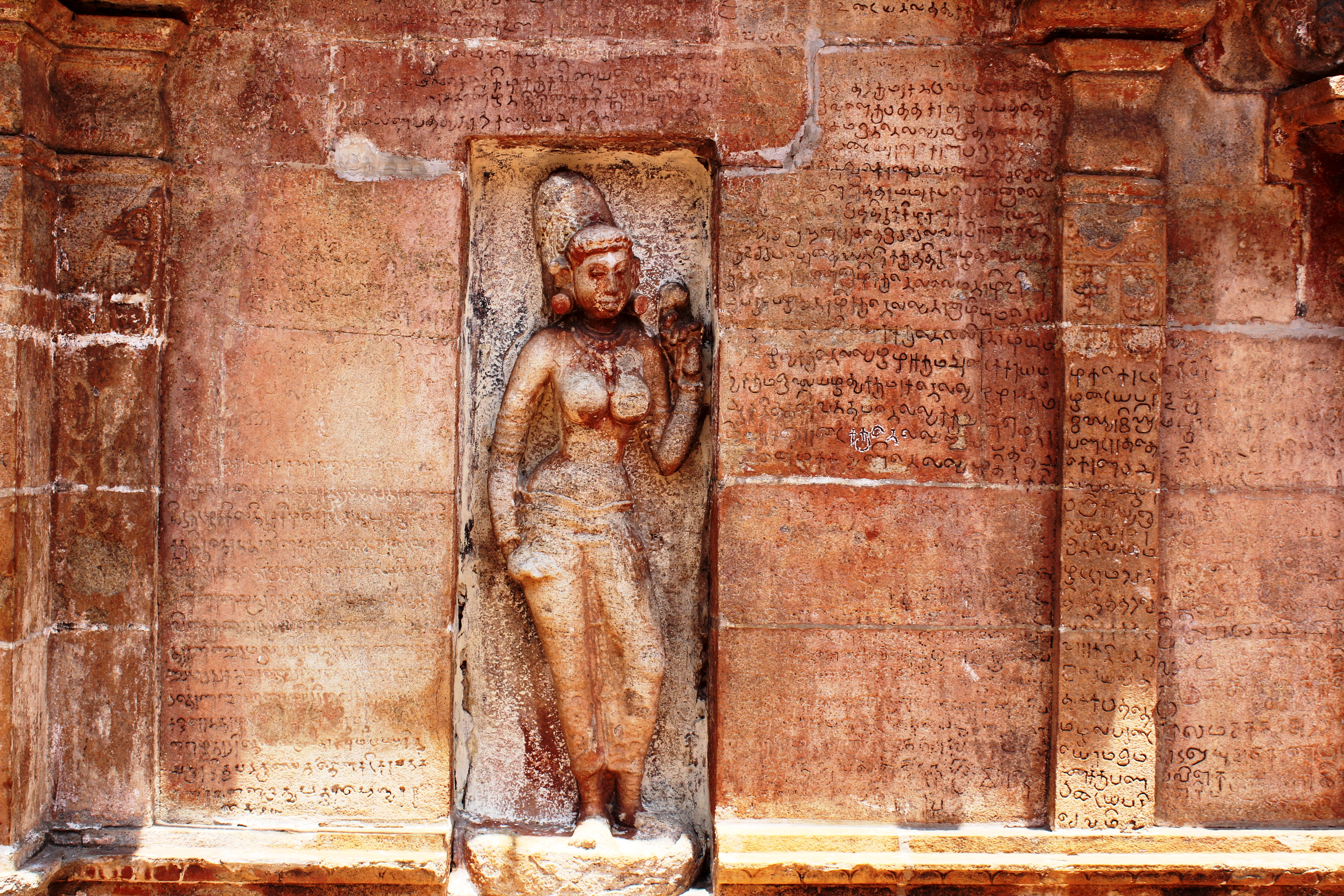
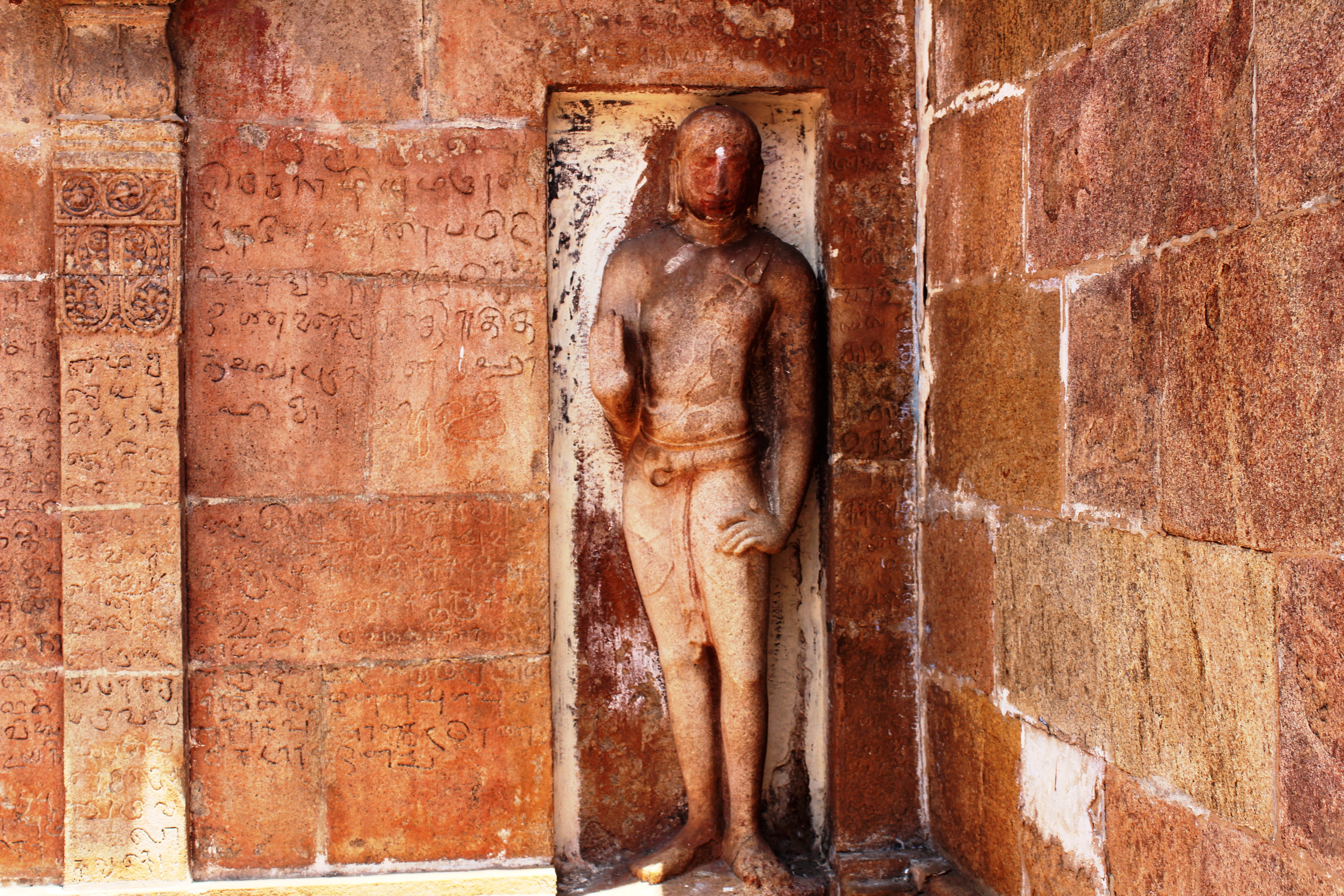
Sculptures from the period of Aditya Chola

Aditya Chola constructed this temple during the 9th century. It is great marvel of Chola architecture, building technology and astronomy. The orientation is structured in such a way that it allows sunlight inside the temple, right on the sanctum only during the Tamil month of Chithirai (April/May). It bears another name called Surya Kottam or Keezha Kottam. The Karuvarai (Sanctum Sanctorum) of Nageswaran temple is similar to Sarangapani Temple, as it is made in the form of a Chariot. The temple consists of three gopurams in the eastern, western and southern directions. The temple is designed in such a way that during the first three days of Tamil month Chittirai (April - May), the rays of the Sun falls directly in the base of the presiding deity in sanctum sanctorum.

The temple had been a centre of learning as seen from the inscriptions in the temple. The inscriptions indicate specific subjects like Purvamimansa styled as Pravahakarma. There were also provisions made for feeding and maintaining for teachers and students. In modern times, the temple is maintained and administered by the Hindu Religious and Charitable Endowments Department of the Government of Tamil Nadu.

== Architecture ==
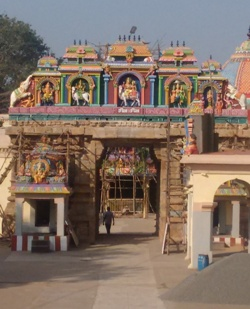
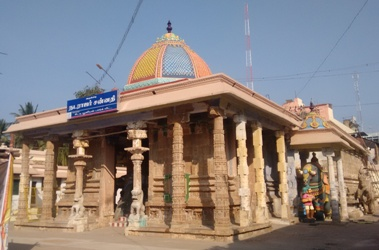
Inner entrance and Shrine of Nataraja

The temple is one of the prominent Shiva temples in Kumbakonam. The temple shows early Chola art in its best form particularly in the form of human figures. The sanctum is of padabandha-padmaka type stands on padmopana. The lotus leaves of the padmopano are carved with vitality. In its iconographic scheme the Ardhanari, Brahma and Dakshinamoorthy in the niches of the outer wall are featured. The other sculptures on the walls almost life-size reflect either the donors to the temples or contemporary princesses and princes. The epic scenes are in low relief on the plinth below the pilasters of the walls of the sanctum, recalling the wood work.

The Devi shrine is an independent structure situated in the outer prakaram(outer precincts of a temple), detached from the axial unit, though it faces south, a feature common to Saiva Devin shrines. The complex of Nataraja shrine is in the form of a chariot on wheel drawn by horses as in the case of Airavatesvara Temple at Darasuram and Sarangapani Temple in Kumbakonam. Similar architecture of halls (Mandapas) simulating a chariot drawn by elephant or horses is found in Sarangapani temple at Kumbakonam, Mela Kadambur Amirthakadeswarar Temple, Sikharagiriswara Temple, Kudumiyamalai, Vriddhagiriswarar Temple, Vriddhachalam and Thyagaraja Temple, Tiruvarur.

According to historian Harle, the temple is counted among the four early extant temples of the Chola Empire, with the other three being Koranganatha Temple in Tiruchirappalli district, Moovar Koil in Pudukottai district, and Brahmapureeswarar temple in Thanjavur district. These temples follow the Pallava architecture which are relatively small in size. They all have a fair-sized porch, locally called ardhamandapa attached to the sanctum, both of which are slightly below the ground level in a pit kind of structure. The structures are also predominantly built of stone.

During Rajendra Chola's Ganges expedition, the victorious chola army brought a beautiful Vinayagar statue as a war trophy to the chola empire. The Vinayagar statue was kept at this temple and was aptly named as Gangai Vinayagar. Currently, the Vinayagar is present in the ardha mandapam, in front of the sanctum of Nageswarar. The Vinayagar seems to be in the Pala style.

== Religious importance ==
Tirugnana Sambandar, a 7th-century Tamil Saivite poet, venerated Nageswarar in ten padigams in Tevaram, compiled as the First Tirumurai and second Tirumuari. Appar, a contemporary of Sambandar, also venerated Nageswarar in 12 padigams in Tevaram, compiled in the Fourth, fifth and sixth Tirumurai. Sundarar, the 8th century Nayanmar revered Nageswarar in seven padigams, which is compiled in Seventh Tirumuari. As the temple is revered in Tevaram, it is classified as Paadal Petra Sthalam, one of the 275 temples that find mention in the Saiva canon. The temple is counted as the 52nd in the list of temples in the northern banks of Cauvery. The temple is counted as one of the temples built on the banks of River Kaveri. The Sun rays falling on the image of Shiva is considered as the worship of Surya.

As per a Hindu belief, people troubled by Sarpa-dosha or Malefic effects Rahu-Kethu seek a relief by offering prayers in a single day to Kudanthai or Kumbakonam Nageshwarar in the morning, Thirunageshwaram Naganathar at the noon, Thirupamburam Pambureswarar in the evening and Nagoor Nageshwarar or Naganathar temple at night.

== Gallery ==
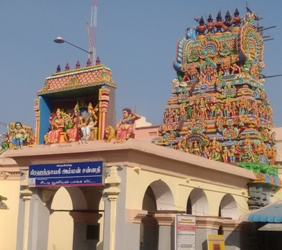
Shrine of the goddess

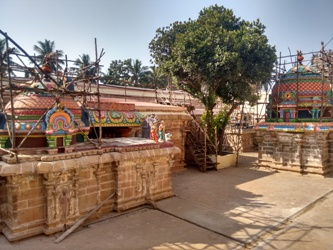
Inner prakara

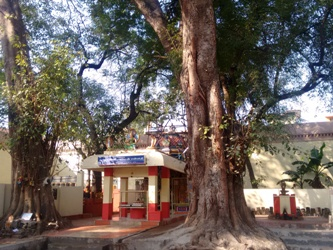
Temple tree

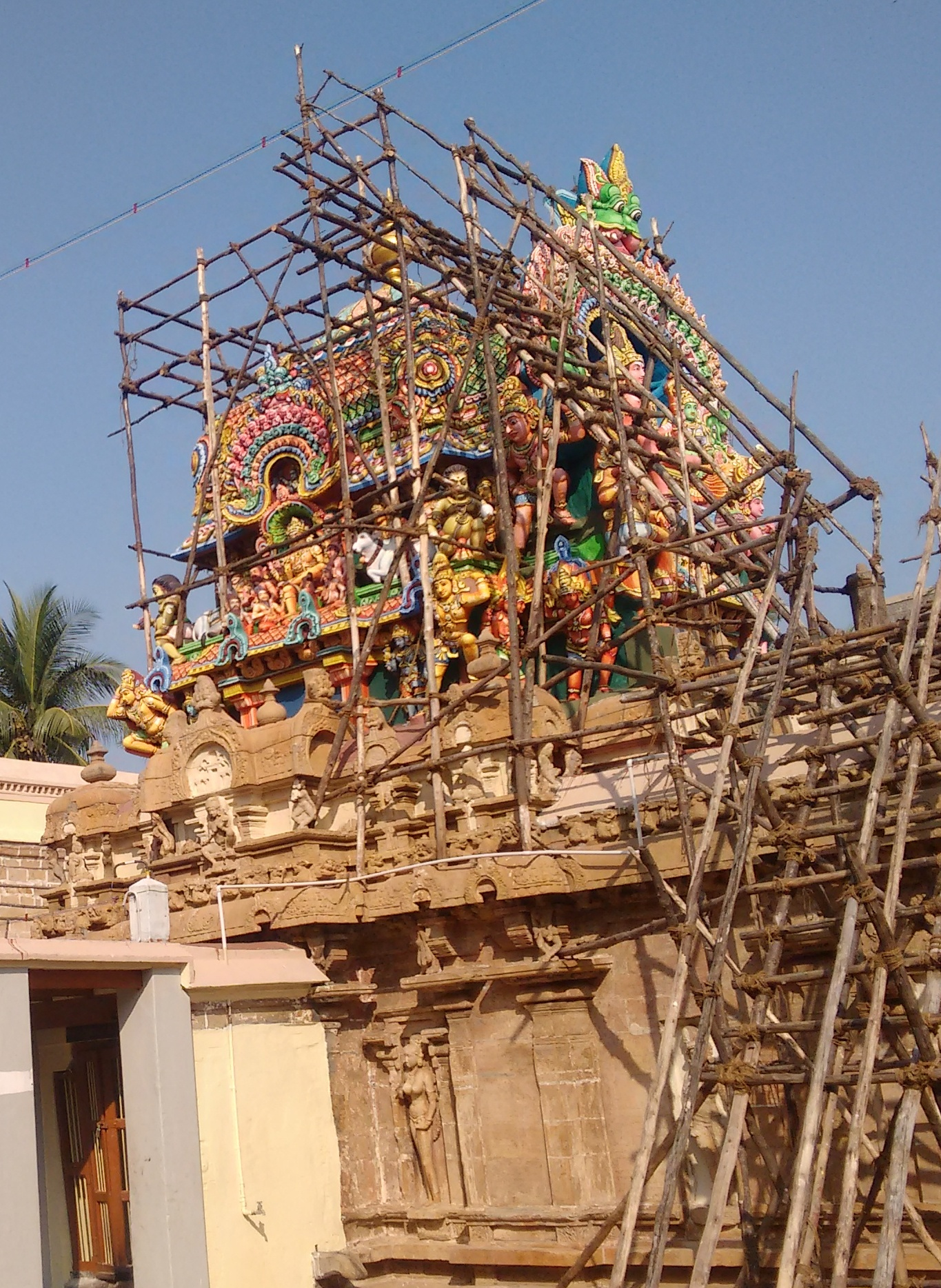
Vimana of the presiding deity

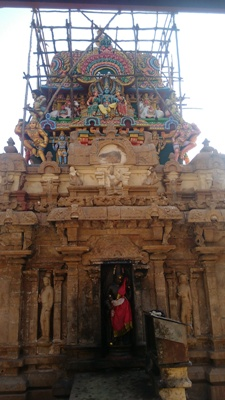
Vimana of the goddess

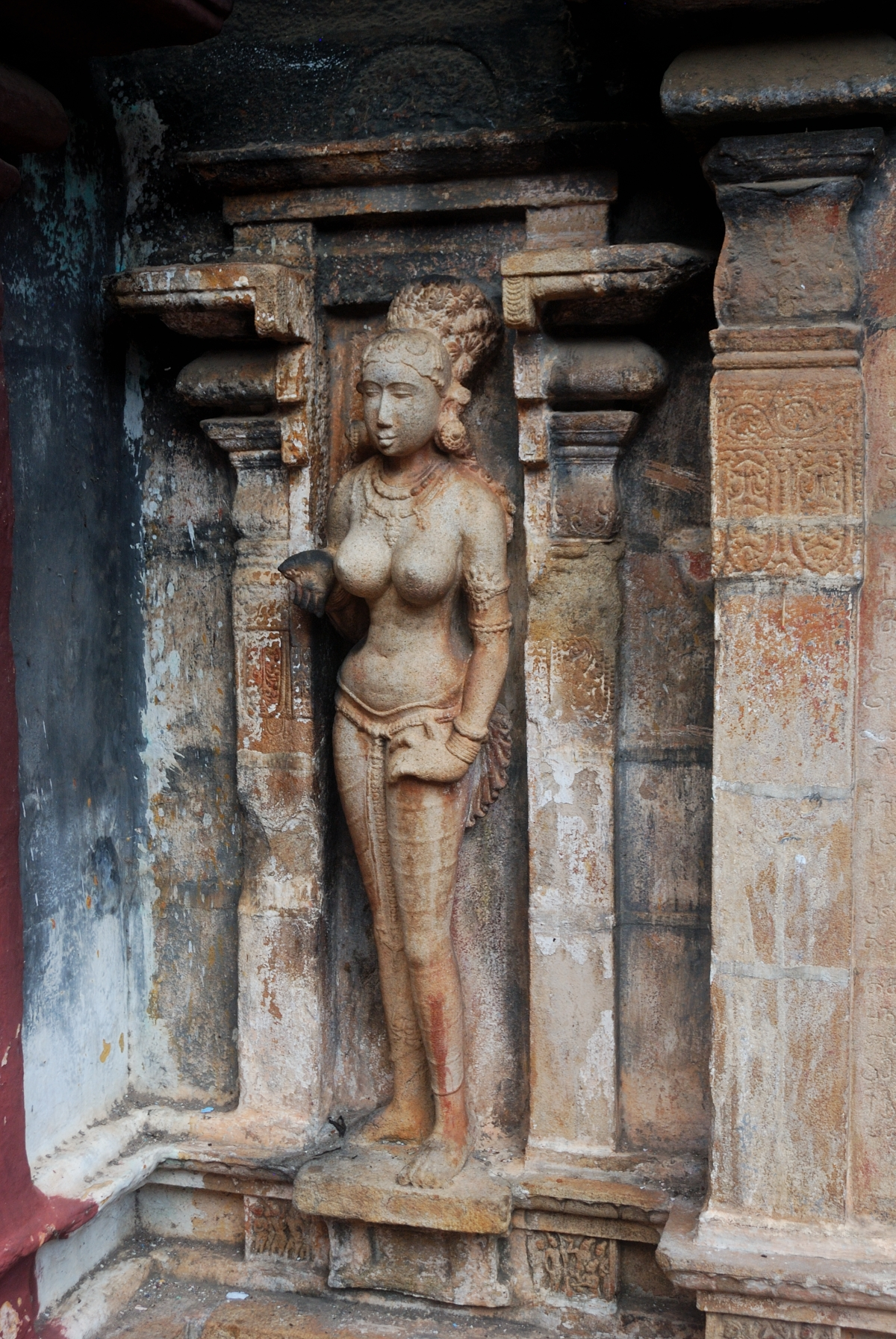
Sculpture at Nagheshwara Temple
