= Melakaveri =

Melakaveri Melacauvery
- Village
- Nickname: MCY
- Interactive map of Melakaveri
- Coordinates: 10°58′01.0″N 79°22′17.6″E
- Country: India
- State: Tamil Nadu
- District: Thanjavur
- Taluk: Kumbakonam

Area
  - Total: 6.07 km^{2} (2.34 sq mi)
- Elevation: 30.1016885 m (98.758821 ft)

Population (2014)
  - Total: 12,000
  - Density: 2,000/km^{2} (5,100/sq mi)

Tamil
  - Official: Tamil
- Time zone: UTC+5:30 (IST)
- Postal code: 612002
- Vehicle registration: TN68

Melakaveri (also called as Melacauvery, MCY) is one of the major villages of Kumbakonam taluk, Thanjavur district, Tamil Nadu, India.

== Demographics ==
As per the 2001 census, Melakaveri had a total population of 12,000 with 5864 males and 6136 females.

It is situated on the highway between Thanjavur and Chennai. The majority of its residents are Muslims. Jamiya Nagar and its surroundings are hamlets of Melakaveri.

It is predominantly agriculture-based. A sizable population of people took up jobs in Far East Asia. As opportunities in these countries diminished, the educated younger generation opted for lucrative jobs in Arab countries of the Persian Gulf. Nowadays, every household in the village has at least one person in the Persian Gulf.

The level of education in the village is comparatively high despite the absence of a high school as late as a decade ago. An English-medium school was opened in 1984, which recently blossomed into a higher secondary school, named Mydeen Matric. Higher Secondary School. An elementary school for girls, a government-aided elementary school, ARR matriculation school, BOVPAT Nursery play School are other schools in the region.

Government Hospital is situated in New Road (Puthu Road).

== Mosque ==
- Jamiya masjid Melacauvery, Muslim main street
- Askar masjid, Jamiya nagar
- Thoweed Jaamath Masjid Kilai 1, North street.
- Thoweed Jaamath Masjid Kilai 2, KMS street.

== Temples ==
- Mokkai Amman temple, 3 Road pillayar temple

== Airports ==
The nearest airports are:

- Tiruchirappalli International Airport - 92 km (57 mi)
- Madurai Airport - 228 km (142 mi)
- Chennai International Airport - 259 km (161 mi)
