= 2016 Mahamaham =

Hindu festival in Tamil Nadu, India

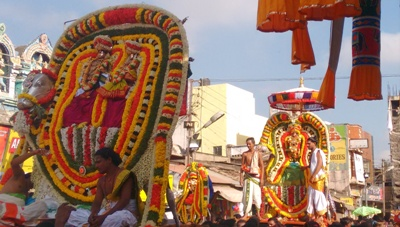
Processional deities of Kumbeswarar temple, atop the vahana

2016 Mahamaham (2016 மகாமகம்) is a recurring festival most recently celebrated at Kumbakonam in Thanjavur district of Tamil Nadu, India from 13 February 2016 to 22 February 2016. Mahamaham, also known as Mahamagham or Mamangam, is a Hindu festival celebrated every 12 years in the Mahamaham tank in Kumbakonam.

== Background ==
Anticipating a deluge that would destroy the world, the creator Brahma sought the help of the lord Shiva, who created a pot containing nectar and the seeds of creation. Brahma decorated the pot with coconut, darbha, mango leaves, sacred thread, vastram and vilvam and performed worshipful puja, placing the pot atop the Meru Hill. When the deluge struck, the pot came to rest in Kumbakonam. Shiva, as a hunter, appeared and opened the pot, and nectar dispersed from it in different directions, emerging as sacred theertham water in the holy Potramarai tank (Sarangapani temple) and Mahamaham tank.

== Bath in holy tank ==
To bathe in the holy tank is said to bring good fortune. The tank has 20 wells named after 20 holy rivers flowing across the country. Belief holds that a dip in these wells rids one of a specific sin and confers a specific blessing to the devotee. Thousands of devotees took a dip in the Mahamaham tank on the opening day of the once-in-12 years gathering in the Thanjavur district. The festival, with its tank bathing tradition, extends over 10 days (Brahmothsavam). The festivities are also observed with smaller crowds in the Magha month (about February) every year between the 12-year Maha (major) cycle. In interim years, the event is called the Masi-maham festival. During festival days, devotees were permitted to bathe in the Mahamaham tank from 6:00 a.m. to 10:00 p.m. Because the tank's 20 wells are named after the country's holy rivers, devotees believe that to take a dip here during the festival is equivalent to bathing in all of these rivers.

People anticipated the 2016 festival for over a year. In connection with it kumbabishegams rituals were held in many temples in Kumbakonam. On the auspicious first day, pandakkal muhurtham was held in many temples followed by hoisting of temples, float festival and tirttavari. On the last two days, (i.e., on 21 and 22 February 2016) all temples were opened from 6:00 a.m. to 10:00 p.m. The 22nd of February 2016 was proclaimed a local holiday in the Thanjavur, Nagapattinam and Tiruvarur districts. On festival days the tank held only two feet of water for safety reasons. Even after the culmination of festival, devotees were found taking bath in the temple.

== Pandakkal muhurttham ==
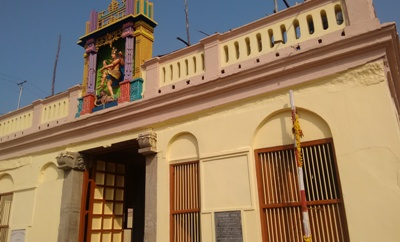
Pandakkal muhurttham in Kumbeswarar Temple

In all temples connected with Mahamaham, on 24 January 2016, Pandakkal muhurttham was held, an event signifying the start of the festival. The merging of holy water in the Mahamaham tank k and opening of water in Mahamaham took place on 12 February 2016. To avoid a crowd and sudden rush, devotees were allowed to bathe before 6:00 a.m. on 13 February 2016. In 40 days over 45 lakh (4.5 million) devotees participated in the festival, and it concluded to the satisfaction of one and all.

== Hoisting of temple flag ==
In Shiva temples on 13 February 2016, and in Vishnu temples on 14 February 2016 temple flags were hoisted. In Kumbeswarar Temple, Nageswara Temple, Kasi Viswanathar Temple, Abimukeswarar Temple, Kahahasteeswarar Temple and Someswarar Temple festivities were held for 10 days. In Brahmotsavam and in Ekambareswarar Temple, Gowthameswarar Temple, Kambatta Visvanathar Temple, Banapuriswarar Temple, Koteeswarar Temple, and Amirthakalasanathar Temple they were held for one day.

== Chariot festival ==
Arrangements were made for chariot festivals at the Abimukeswarar Temple and the Nageswarar Temple, and on 21 February 2016 at the Kumbeswarar Temple on 22 February 2016 After four Mahamahams, five temple chariots run at one stretch, at Kumbeswarar Temple. Chariot festivals of Kasi Viswanathar Temple, Abimukeswarar Temple and Nageswara Temple were held on 21 February 2016.

== Tirttavari ==
"Asthira Devar" — (‘Trishul’ with images of the respective Gods) of each temple were brought and ‘abishekams’ were performed. At the auspicious time, priests took the ‘Asthira Devars’ and immersed them in the tank and bathed, signaling the fulfillment of the "Theerthavari". The Tirttavari Trial for Tirttavari was held on 6 February 2016. For Shiva temples it was held on 22 February 2016 between 12:00 noon and 1:30 p.m. in the Mahamaham Tank. For five Vishnu temples it was held on the banks of Kaveri. Those five temples are Sarangapani Temple, Chakrapani Temple, Ramaswamy Temple, Rajagopalaswamy Temple, and Varahaperumal Temple. During Tirttavari, processional deities of 12 Shiva temples were kept on the Nandi vahana and went around the town's main streets. Later, in the Mahamaham tank, special abisegam sprinkling rituals were held to Astra devars, and Tirttavari was held. For five Vishnu temples, Tirttavari was held to astradevars at Sarangapani Tirttavari mandapa, near to Sakkarai ghat, known as Sakkara paditthurai in Tamil.

== Cultural programmes ==
In connection with Mahamaham, exhibitions and cultural programmes were held in five places in Kumbakonam. From 13 February 2016 Government Exhibition was held in the ground of Town Higher Secondary School. A book exhibition was held from 20 February 2016.

== Commemoration volumes ==
Special postcards Mahamaham Special cover and calendars with photographs of the processional deities of 12 Shiva temples and five Vishnu temples were also released. The Hindu Religious and Charitable Endowments Department of the Government of Tamil Nadu and Saraswathi Mahal Library released commemorative volumes with articles about various aspects such religion, the arts, temples and Kumbakonam.

== Arrangements ==
The Kumbakonam Municipality, in its sesquicentennial year, 2016, has spent over Rs. 50 crore ($6.8 million US) to improve civic infrastructure to ensure a hygienic and memorable environment for visiting devotees of Mahamham; this investment included special arrangements to improve facilities such as water supply, street lighting, bio-mining work, town roads and sanitary lines. Police also made elaborate security arrangements to prevent stampedes. A team of 25,000 policemen and 3,000 home guards was deployed throughout the town. All vehicles were halted at least one and half km from the temple, and all temples were cordoned off.

== Other Tanks ==
The tanks of Kumbakonam got a new lease of life thanks to Mahamaham. They are the Pachaiyappan tank, Sei Kulam, Ayee Kulam, Bairagi Kulam, Pidari Kulam and Banadurai Kulam.

== Photogallery ==
=== On Tirttavari day ===
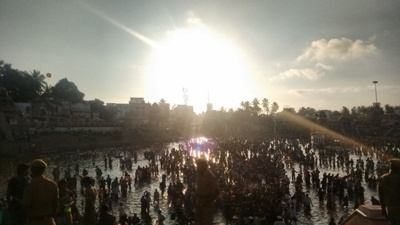
Sunrise near Mahamaham tank

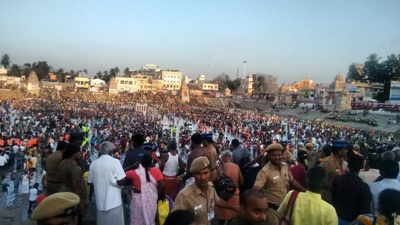
Devotees in Mahamaham Tank

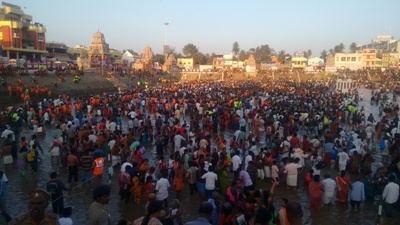
Devotees in Mahamaham Tank

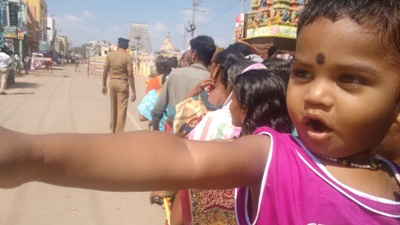
Devotees going to Portamarai Tank

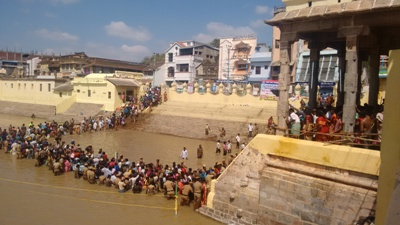
Devotees taking bath Portamarai Tank

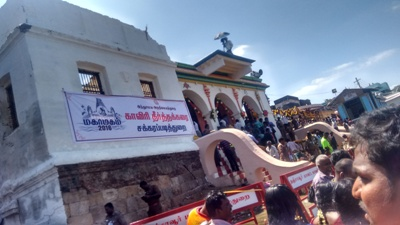
Devotees in Kavery

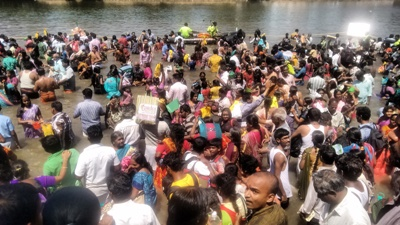
Devotees taking bath in Kavery

=== Shiva and Vishnu Temples ===
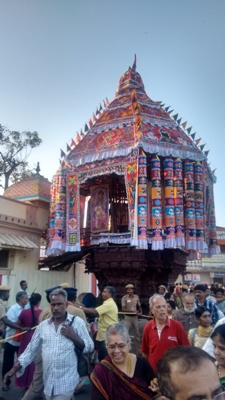
Chariot of Abimukeswarar Temple

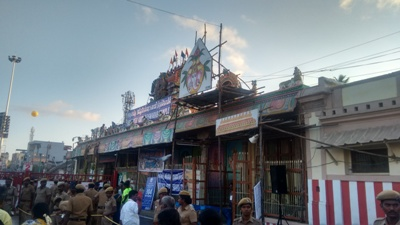
Abimukeswarar Temple

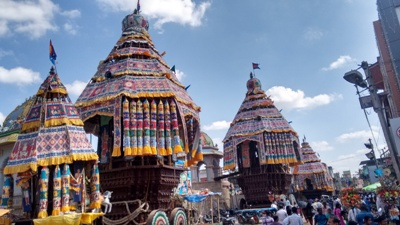
Five chariots of Kumbeswarar Temple

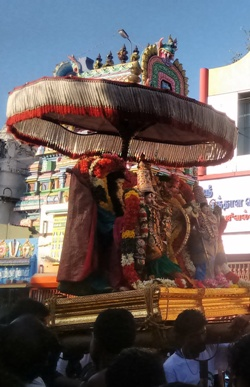
Processional deity of Ramasamy Temple

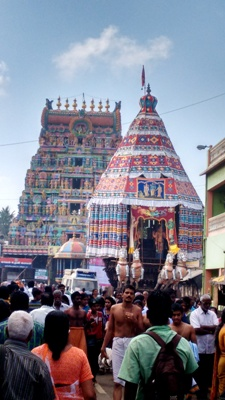
Ramasamy Temple

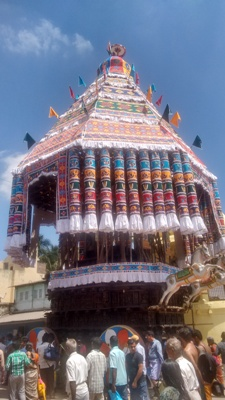
Chakrapani Temple chariot

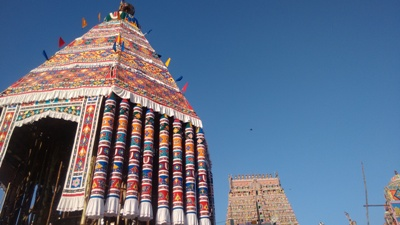
Sarangapani Temple and chariot

== See also ==
- Mahamaham Stampede
- Mamankam (Tirunavaya, Kerala)
- Mahamaham
