= Mamangam =

Mamangam may refer to:

- Mamankam festival or Māmāngam, a duodecennial medieval fair held at Tirunāvāya, Kerala in southern India
- Mamangam (TV series), an Indian Malayalam-language television series
- Mamangam (film), a 2019 Indian Malayalam-language period action film

== See also ==
- Maamaankam, a 1979 Indian Malayalam-language historical drama film
- Mahamaham, a similar festival in Tamil Nadu, India
  - Mahamaham tank, temple tank in Kumbakonam, Tamil Nadu, India where the festival takes place
  - 2016 Mahamaham, 2016 edition of the festival
  - Mahamaham stampede, stampede at the 1992 edition
