= Sundaresvarar Temple, Koranattukarupur =

Shiva temple in Tamil Nadu, India

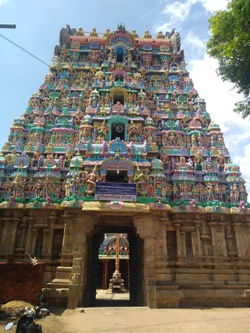
Rajagopura

Sundaresvarar Temple is a Siva temple in Koranattukarupur near Kumbakonam in Thanjavur district in Tamil Nadu, India.

== Location ==
This temple is located at Karupur also known as Koranattukarupur in Kumbakonam-Chennai road, at a distance of 3 km from Kumbakonam. As there were more number of Pathiri trees, this place was called as Koranattukarupur.

== Structure ==
The temple has five tier Rajagopura. In the sanctum sanctorum, the presiding deity is in the form of a lingam facing east. The shrine of his consort is facing south. In the first Prakaram, Vahana mandapa, kitchen, yagasala are found. In the south west sanctum sanctorum, is found. In the second prakara, Dakshinamurthi, Vinayaka, Subramania, Saptamathar, Mahalakshmi, Durga are found. In the north Nataraja, and Bairava, are found. In the north east Navagraha is found.

== Presiding deity ==
The presiding deity is known as Sundaresvarar, Sundarar and Lokasundarar. The consort is known as Abirami. Kumbhabhishekham of this temple took place during March 2018.

== Panchakorsa Sthalam ==
This is one of the Panchakrosa Sthalams, a cluster of five Siva temples connected with Mahamaham festival of Kumbakonam. Other temples are Tiruvidaimaruthur, Tirunagesvaram, Darasuram and Swamimalai.

== Gallery ==
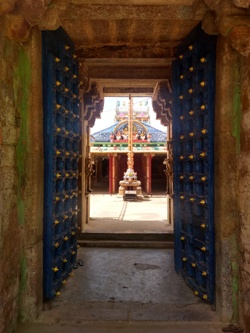
Entrance

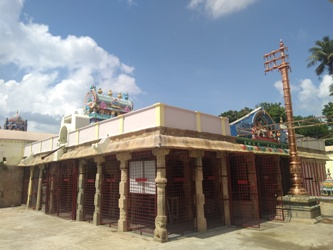
Front mandapa

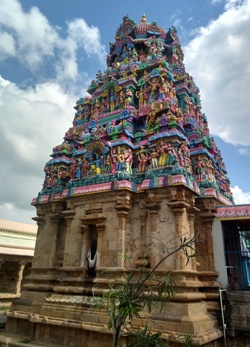
Vimana of the presiding deity

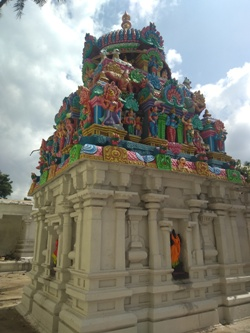
Vimana of Abirami

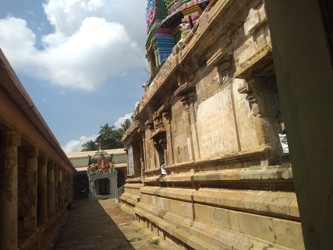
Outer prakara, north

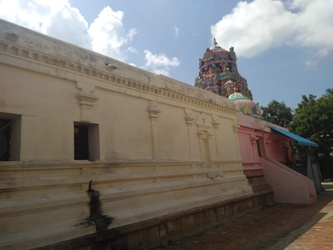
Outer prakara, south
