= Sodasa Linga Mandapas, Kumbakonam =

Shiva temple in Tamil Nadu, India

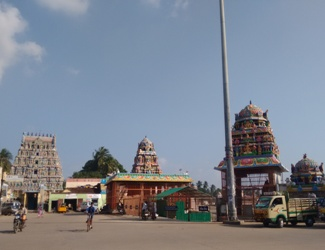
Mandapas of Brammatheerthesvarar and Mukundesvarar, near Kasi Visvanathar Temple

Sodasa Linga Mandapas are Hindu temples dedicated to the deity Shiva, the mandapas or temples found around the Mahamaham tank in Kumbakonam in Thanjavur district, Tamil Nadu, India.

== Sodasa ==
Sodasa refers to sixteen.

== 16 mandapas ==
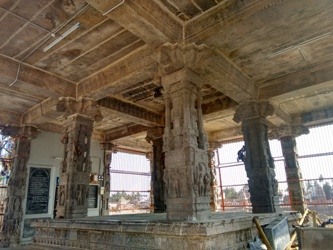

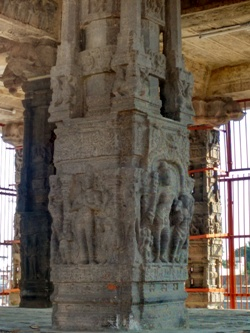

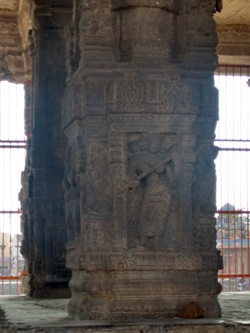
Sculptures in Mukundesvarar mandapa

These 16 mandapas are devoted to Brammatheerthesvarar, Mukundesvarar, Dhanesvarar, Virushabesvarar, Baanesvarar, Konesvarar, Bhakthikesvarar, Bhairavesvarar, Agasthisvarar, Vyasakesvarar, Umabakevarar, Nirutheesvarar, Brammesvarar, Gangathesvarar, Mukthatheerthesvarar, and Shethrabalesvarar. They were represented by the lingam. Govinda Dikshitar, the chieftain of Ragunatha Nayak of Thanjavur, constructed the sixteen mandapams and stone steps around this tank.

Of the mandapas, in the biggest one, the sculpture of offering of gold by Ragunatha Nayak is found. In other mandapas sculptures pertaining to the respective grants are found.

== Directions ==
Around the Mahamaham tank, these mandapas are found in all directions, except south. Of these shrines and mandapas eight are facing east-west, four are facing south-north, two are facing south-west and north-east and two are in north-east and south-west and south-east and north-east. These mandapas are under the administration of Kasi Visvanathar Temple.

Temples	Mandapas
Southwest	Northeast
East	West
East	West
East	West
South	North
Northeast	Southwest
East	West
East	West
Southeast	Northwest
South	North
South	North
South	North
Southwest	Northeast
East	West
East	West
East	West

== Kumbhabhishekham ==
These mandapas are also called as Sodasa (16) Mahalingas. Kumbhabhishekham to these mandapas were held on 29 November 2015.

== See also ==
- Mamankam festival

== Sodasa mandapas ==
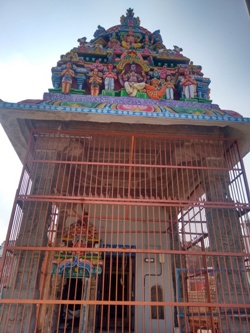
Brammatheerthesvarar mandapa

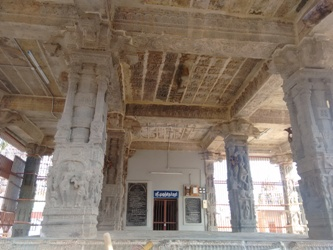
Mukundesvarar mandapa

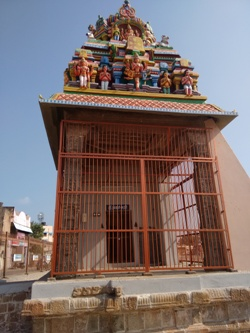
Dhanesvarar mandapa

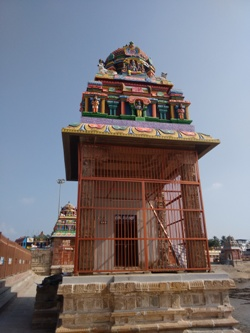
Virushabesvarar mandapa

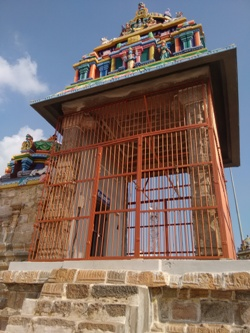
Baanesvarar mandapa

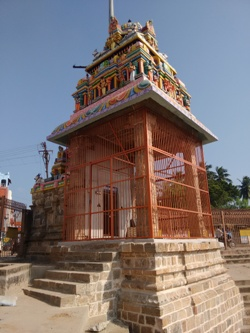
Konesvarar mandapa

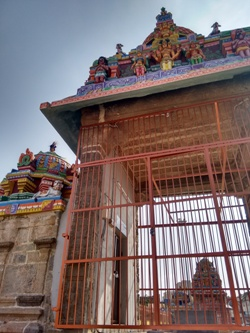
Bhakthikesvarar mandapa

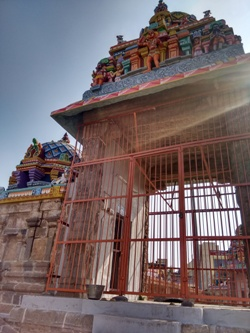
Bhairavesvarar mandapa

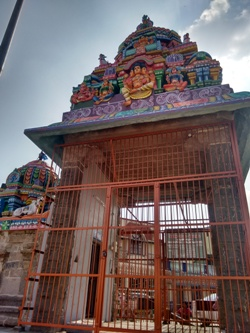
Agasthisvarar mandapa

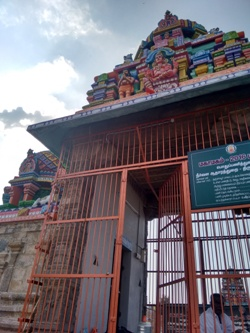
Vyasakesvarar mandapa

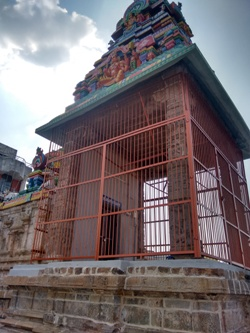
Umabakevarar mandapa

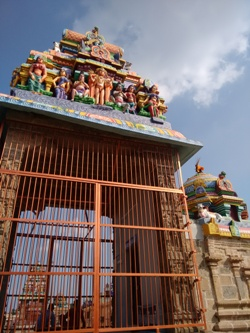
Nirutheesvarar mandapa

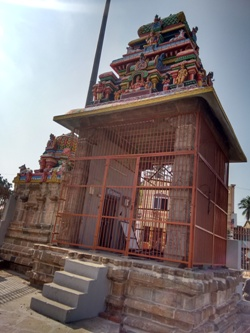
Brammesvarar mandapa

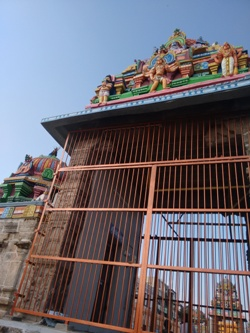
Gangathesvarar mandapa

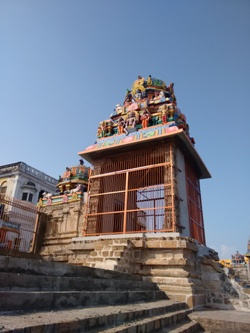
Mukthatheerthesvarar mandapa

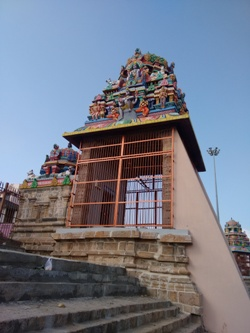
Shethrabalesvarar mandapa
