= Kasi Viswanathar Temple, Kumbakonam =

Kasi Viswanathar Temple
- Kudanthai Karonam
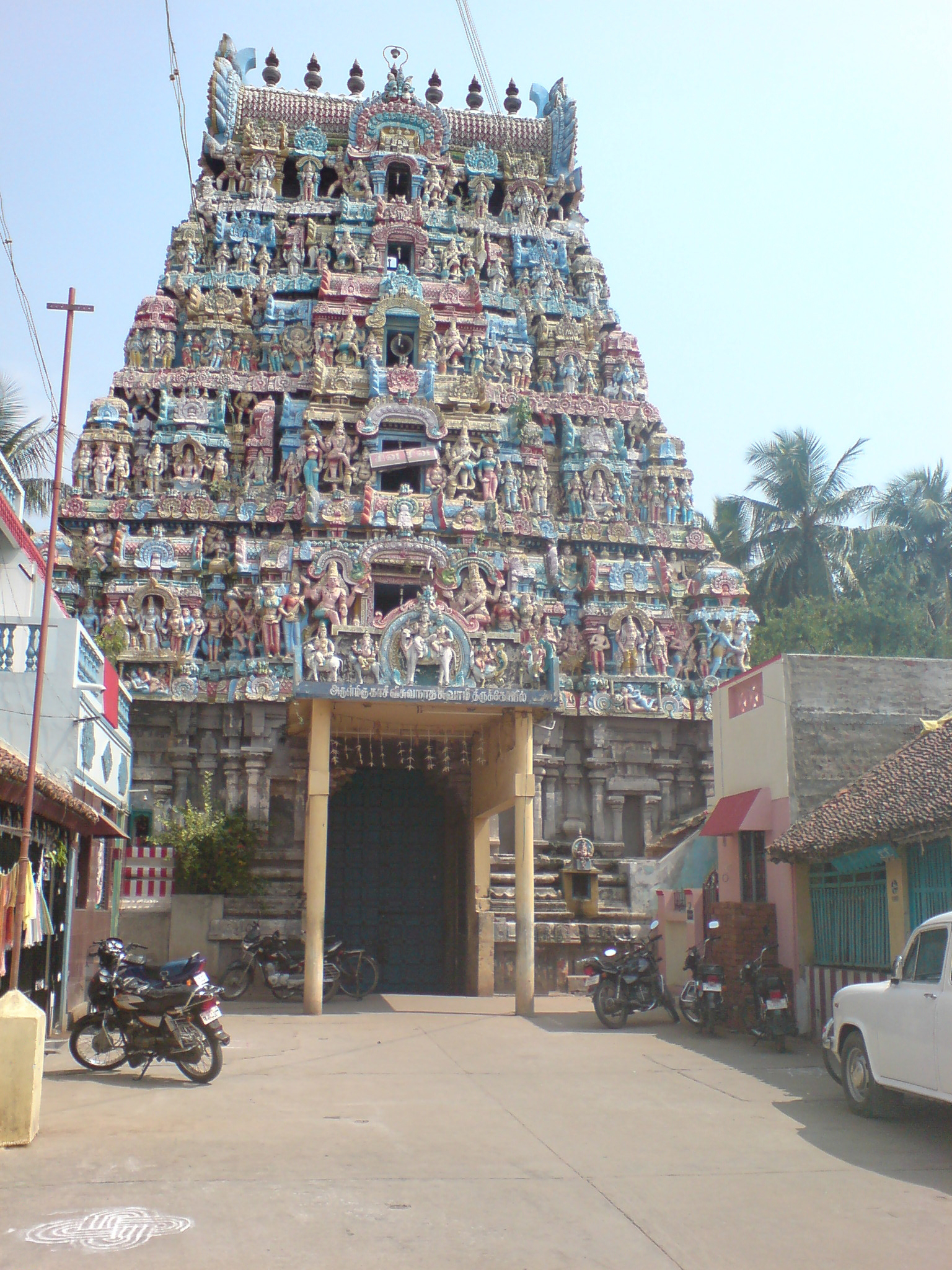

- Location in Tamil Nadu

Religion
- Affiliation: Hinduism
- District: Tanjore
- Deity: Kasi Viswanathar (Shiva) Visalakshi (Parvathi), Nava Kannigas
- Features: Temple tank: Mahamaham tank

Location
- Location: Kumbakonam
- State: Tamil Nadu
- Country: India
- Coordinates: 10°57′23.86″N 79°22′55.92″E

Architecture
- Type: Dravidian architecture

Kasi Viswanathar Temple, Kumbakonam is a Hindu temple dedicated to Lord Shiva, located in Kumbakonam, Tamil Nadu, India. Here, Lord Shiva is worshipped as Kasi Viswanathar, and His consort Parvati is depicted as Visalakshi. The presiding deity is revered in the 7th-century Tamil Saiva canonical work, the Tevaram, written by Tamil saint poets known as the nayanars and classified as Paadal Petra Sthalam.

The temple complex covers two acres and is located close to the Mahamaham tank. It houses two gateway towers known as gopurams. The tallest is the western tower, with seven stories and a height of 72 feet (22 m). The temple has numerous shrines, with those of Kasi Viswanathar, Visalakshi and Navakanniyar being the most prominent.

The temple has six daily rituals at various times from 6:00 a.m. to 9 p.m., and twelve yearly festivals on its calendar. The Masi Magam festival is celebrated during the day of the Magam (February–March) is the most prominent festival.

The present masonry structure was built during the Nayak during the 16th century. In modern times, the temple is maintained and administered by the Hindu Religious and Charitable Endowments Department of the Government of Tamil Nadu.

== Legend ==
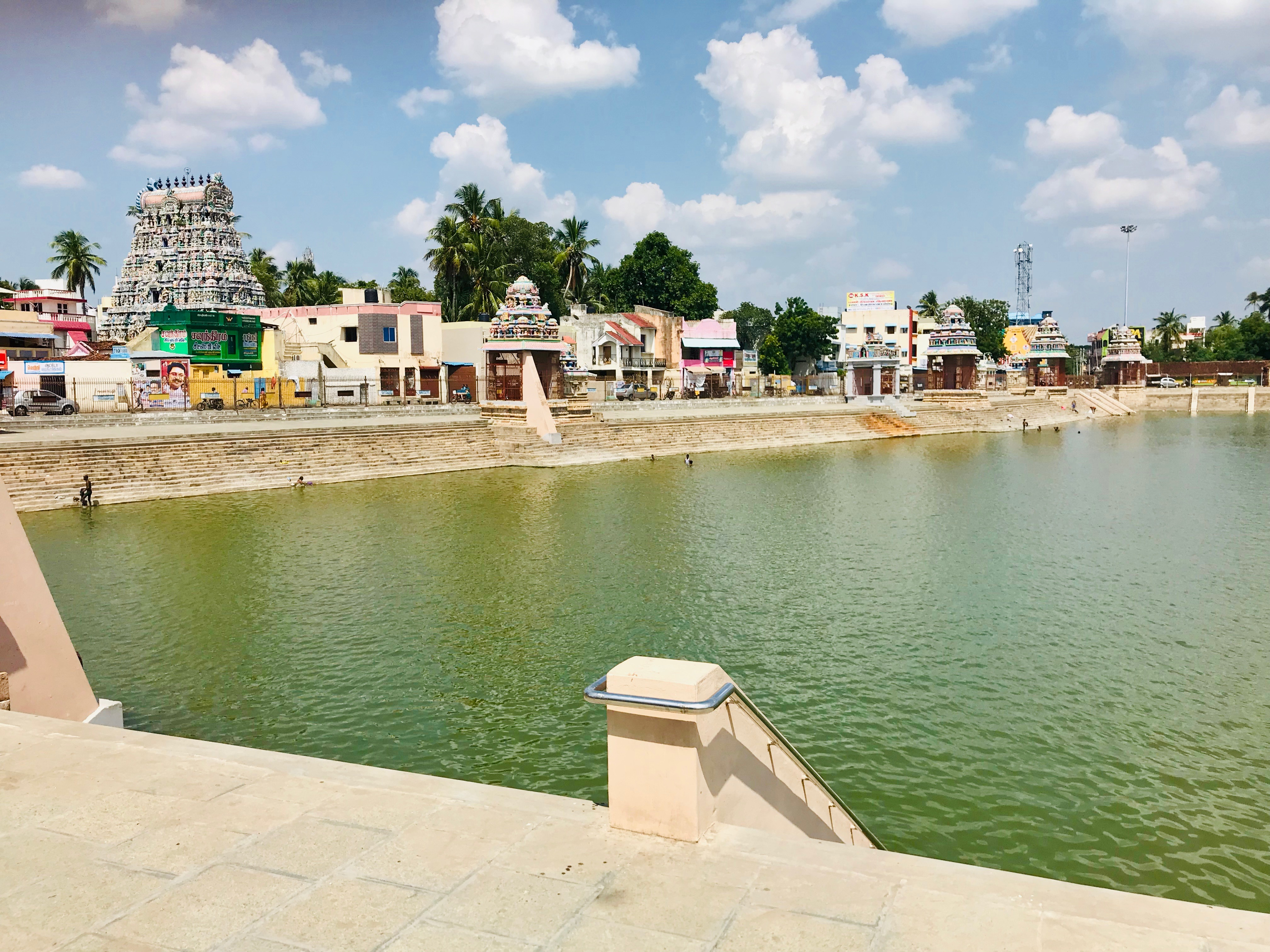
Mahamaham tank

This place has been referred to in Tevaram written by Saint Poet (7th century CE) Thirugnana Sambanthar and Thirunavukkarasar. This temple is referred back to Ramayana period when Lord Rama and Lakshmana are said to have worshipped Shiva here during their search for Sita, and acquired Rudramsam, to enable them to fight Ravana. Legend has it that the nine sacred rivers of India, prayed to Shiva at Banares (Viswanathar) to be absolved of the sins washed away by bathers, and were directed to bathe in the Mahamagam tank and worship Adi Kumbeswarar Temple. Viswanathar of Kaasi is believed to have manifested himself here at Kumbhakonam at Kudandaikkaronam. As per another legend, the holy pot from Shiva's arrow split into twelve places where Shiva temples were built and the temple is counted as one of them.

== Architecture ==
The temple is located near the banks of Mahamaham tank. This temple has two prakarams (outer courtyard) and a 72 ft high Rajagopuram. The temple has a nava kanniyar, a.k.a. nava kannigais (nine rivers), in the form of deities worshiping Shiva, and hence the temple is referred as 'Nava Kanniyar' temple. The nine river deities depicted are Ganges, Yamuna, Narmada, Saraswati, Cauvery, Godavari, Krishna, Tungabhadra and Sarayu. The lingam worshipped by Rama is located in the north eastern prakaram (outer courtyard) of the temple. As per local legend, he lingam is believed to grow with time. In modern times, the temple is maintained and administered by the Hindu Religious and Charitable Endowments Department of the Government of Tamil Nadu.

== Worship and religious practices ==
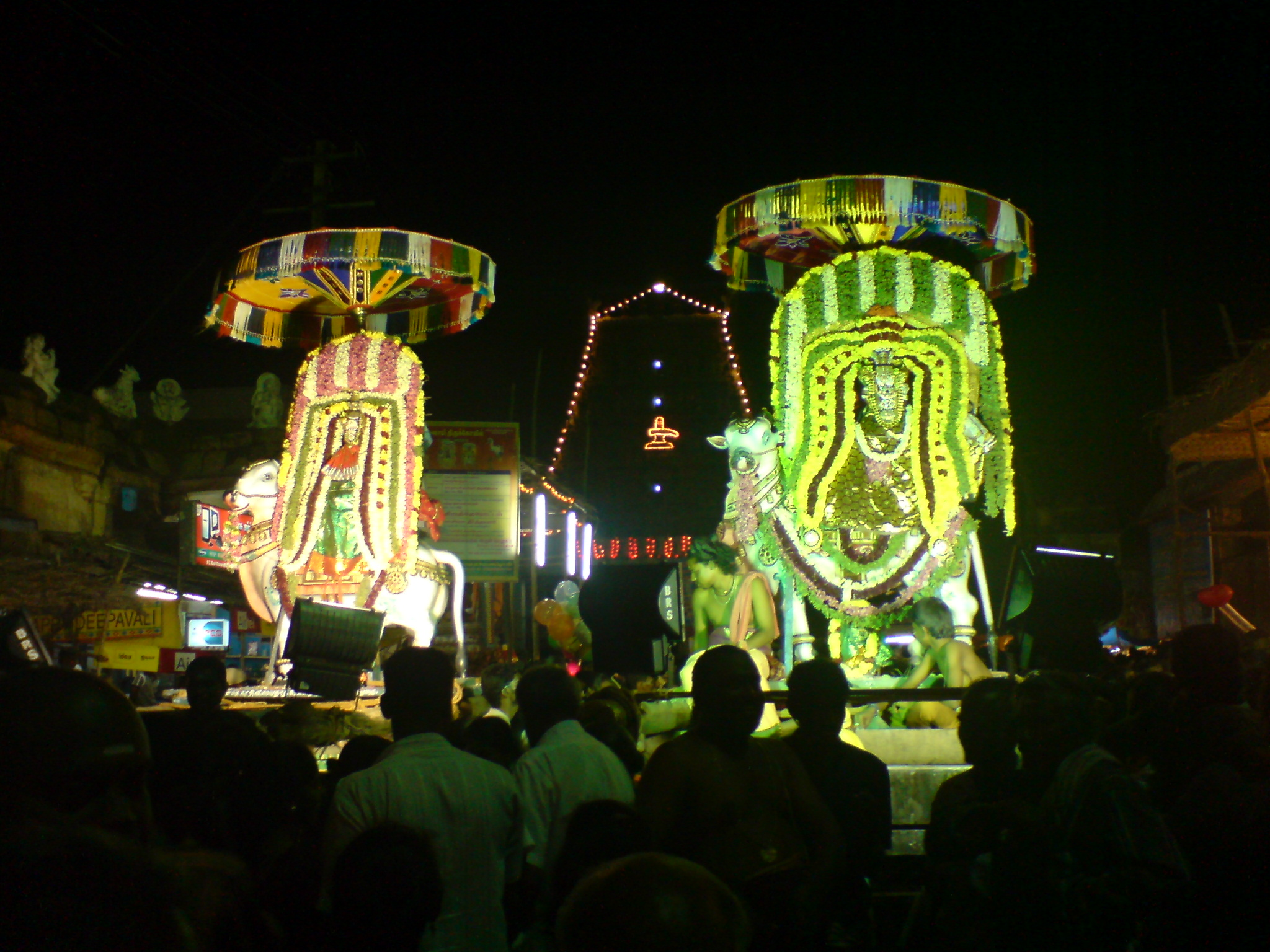
Image of festival deity of the temple

The temple priests perform Puja (rituals) during festivals and on a daily basis. The temple rituals are performed six times a day; Kalasanthi at 6:00 a.m., Irandam Kalm at 9:00 a.m., Uchikalam at 12:00 a.m., Sayarakshai at 6:00 p.m., Irandam Kalm at 7:30 p.m., and Arthajamam at 9:00 p.m. Each ritual comprises four steps: abhisheka (sacred bath), alangaram (decoration), naivethanam (food offering) and deepa aradanai (waving of lamps) for Viswanathar and Visalakshi. There are weekly rituals like somavaram (Monday) and sukravaram (Friday), fortnightly rituals like pradosham, and monthly festivals like amavasai (new moon day), kiruthigai, pournami (full moon day) and sathurthi. Masi Maham during the Tamil month of Maasi (February–March), Shivaratri in February- March and Panguni Uthiram during Panguni are the major festivals celebrated in the temple.

== Specialty ==
12 Shiva temples are connected with Mahamaham festival which happens once in 12 years in Kumbakonam. They are:

- Kasi Viswanathar Temple,
- Adi Kumbeswarar Temple,
- Someswarar Temple,
- Nageswaraswamy Temple,
- Kalahasteeswarar Temple,
- Gowthameswarar Temple,
- Kodeeswarar Temple,
- Amirthakadeswarar Temple,
- Banapuriswarar Temple,
- Abimukeswarar Temple,
- Kambatta Viswanathar Temple and
- Ekambareswarar Temple.

This temple is one among them.

The temple is counted as one of the temples built on the banks of River Kaveri.

== Photogallery ==
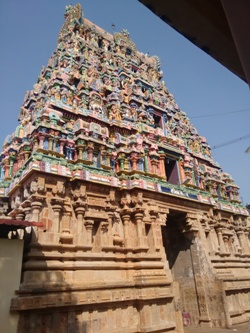

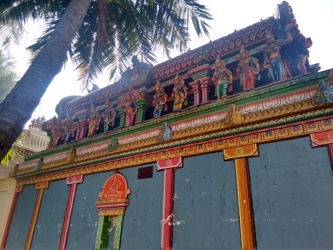

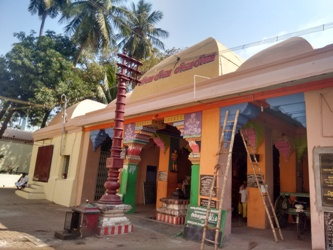

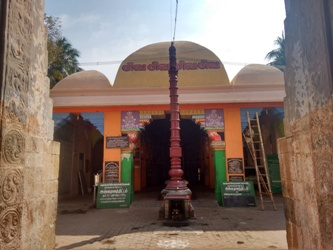

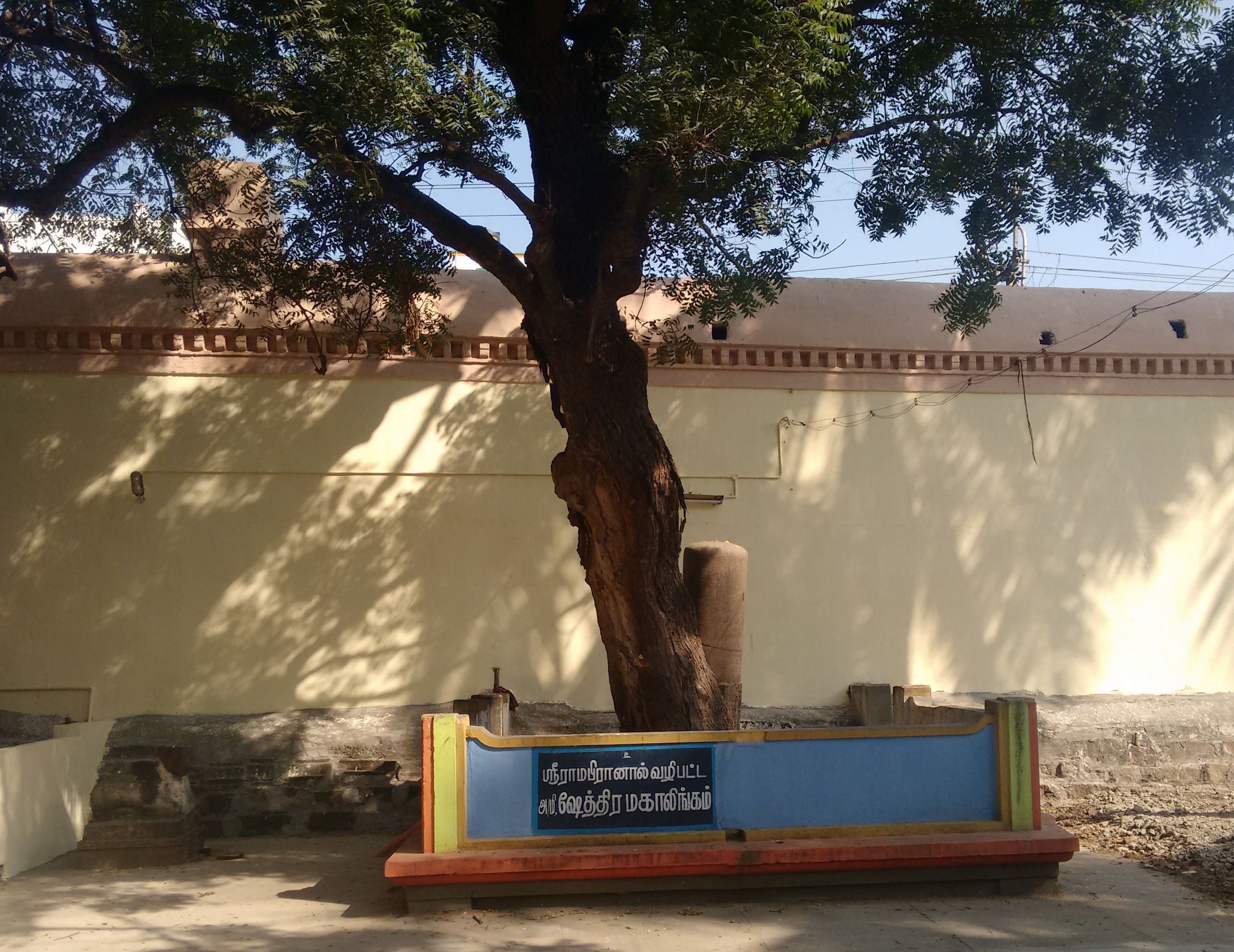

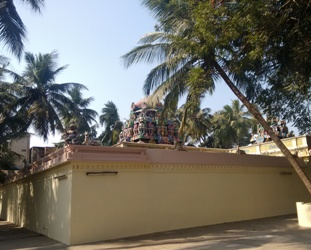

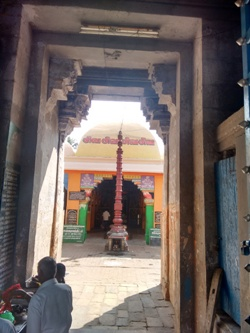
