= Mahamaham =

Tamil Hindu festival

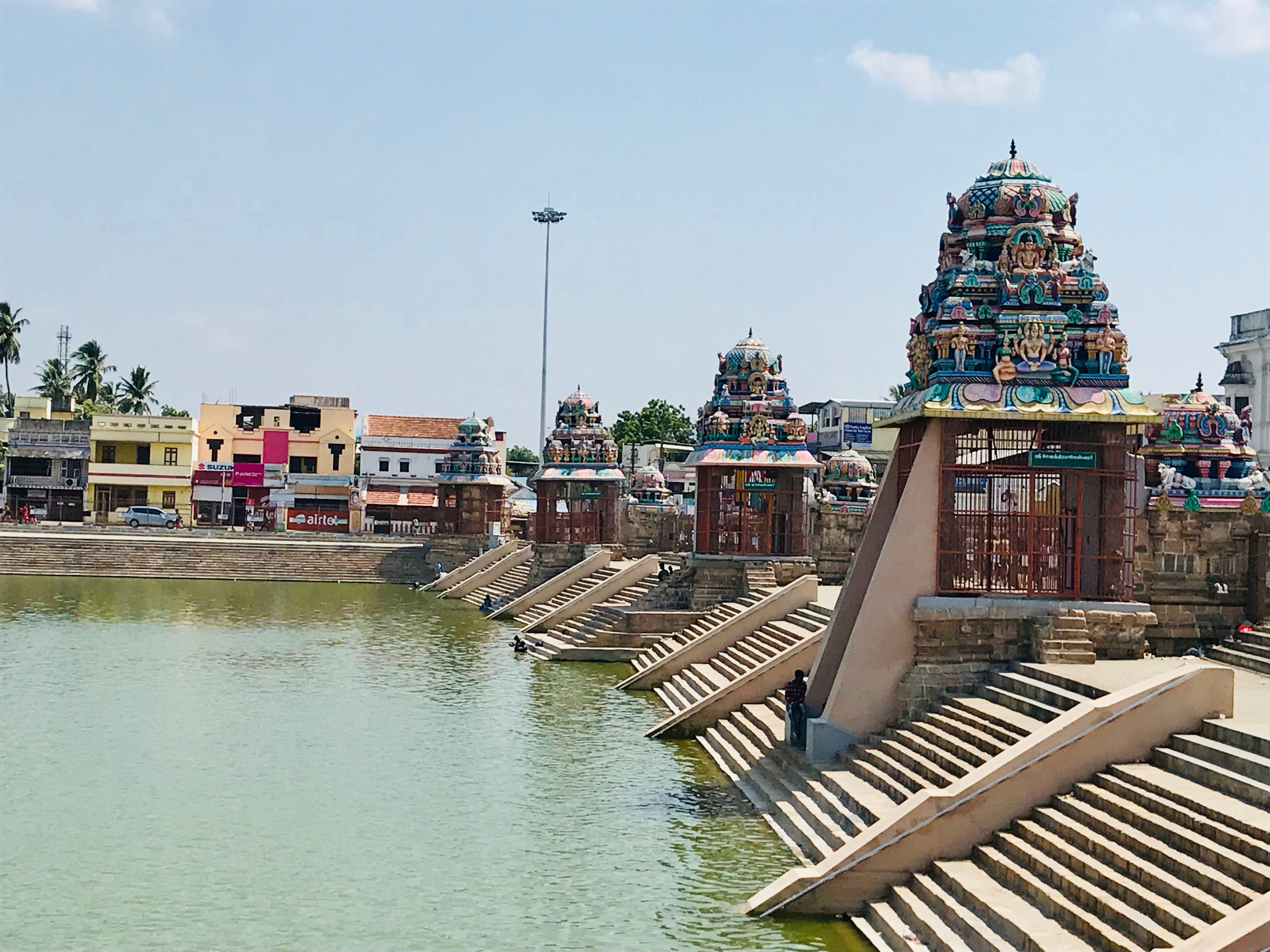
- Mahamaham tank
- Genre: Religious festival
- Frequency: 12 years
- Locations: Kumbakonam, Tamil Nadu
- Coordinates: 10.9558°N 79.3817°E
- Country: India
- Most recent: 2016
- Next event: 2028
- Attendance: >1 million (in 2016)

Mahamaham is a Hindu religious festival celebrated every twelve years at Kumbakonam in Tamil Nadu, India. Observed during the Hindu calendar month of Magha, it is considered a southern counterpart to the Kumbh Mela. While the festival's annual observance is known as Masimaham (named after the Tamil calendar month of Masi), the primary Mahamaham occurs once every twelve years. The festival attracts large crowds, documented in administrative and traveler accounts since the 19th century. The most recent Mahamaham was celebrated on 22 February 2016.

Pilgrims gather at the central Mahamaham tank, whose waters are believed to receive the sacred confluence of nine river goddesses: Ganga, Yamuna, Sarasvati, Narmada, Godavari, Krishna, Tungabhadra, Kaveri, and Sarayu. According to the 12th-century Tamil classical work Periya Puranam, these river deities convene at the tank on this day to worship Shiva and cleanse their own waters. Devotees undertake ritual bathing in the tank to atone for past transgressions and purify themselves. This multi-day event also features temple chariot (ter) processions, devotional music, and cultural performances across the town.

== Mythology ==
The Mahamaham tank is surrounded by sixteen mandapas (pavilions) housing Shiva lingas and sculptures of Vedic and Puranic deities. The Kashi Vishwanathar temple is situated in the tank's northern bank. At the temple gateway, carvings depict Shiva with nine personified river goddesses. Epigraphs and sculptures depicting scenes from the Periya Purana can been all along the temple pavilion. The complete legend is recorded on the walls of the nearby Adi Kumbeswarar Temple. According to this narrative, during mahapralaya (cosmic dissolution), Brahma placed the seeds of creation and nectar of immortality (amrutam) inside a sacred pot (kumbha). When floodwaters receded, the vessel came to rest at Kumbakonam, where Shiva—in his manifestation as a hunter (kiratamurti)—dislodged it with an arrow. The contents of the pot, thus released, became the Mahamaham tank.

According to tradition, the fragments of the broken pot, along with the coconut and mango leaves adorning it, formed the sacred sites of the town. This established twelve Shiva and five Vaishanava temples in the vicinity including, Adi Kumbeswarar, Someswarar, Kasi Viswanathar, Sarangapani, and Chakrapani.

Astronomically, the festival coincides with the full moon entering the Makha Nakshatra (in the constellation Leo or Simha) while the Sun occupies the opposite sign of Aquarius (kumbha). The full twelve-year cycle of Mahamaham occurs once in twelve years when this planetary configuration coincides with Jupiter transiting through Leo.

== History ==
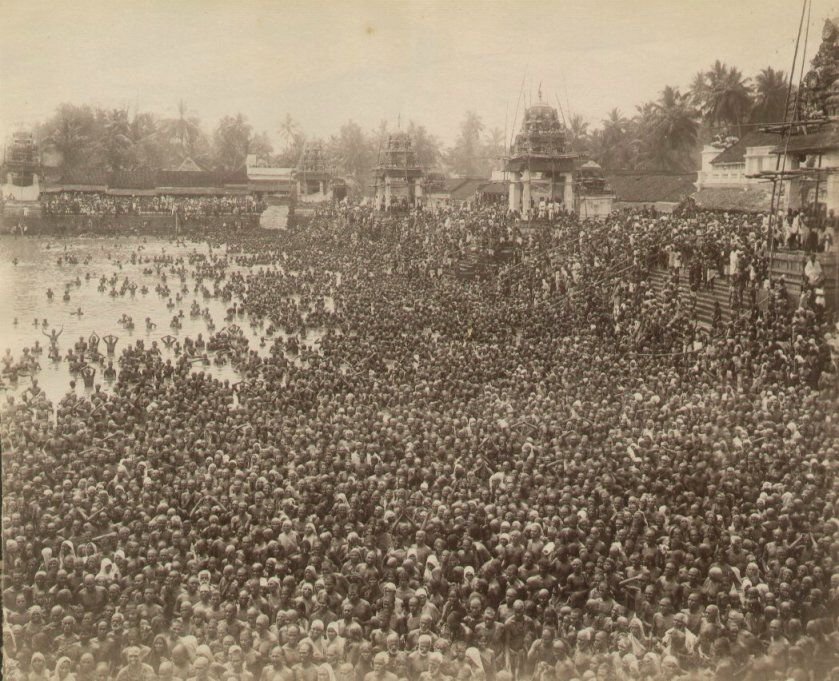
Mahamaham festival in 1896

Epigraphical evidence suggests that the festival has been celebrated for more than five centuries. Inscriptions at Nagalpuram in Chengalpattu district and the Shiva temple at Kuthalam have records of royal pilgrimage of the Vijayanagara Emperor Krishnadevaraya (r. 1509–1529) to the festival in 1524. During the 16th-century Thajavur Nayak period, minister Govinda Dikshitar sponsored the construction of the sixteen stone mandapas surrounding the tank and funded royal weight donations in gold (tulapurusha-dana).

The tank remains a significant pilgrimage destination in southern India. It is venerated as the regional equivalent of the Prayag Sangam (Kumbh Mela) in Uttar Pradesh.

== The festival ==
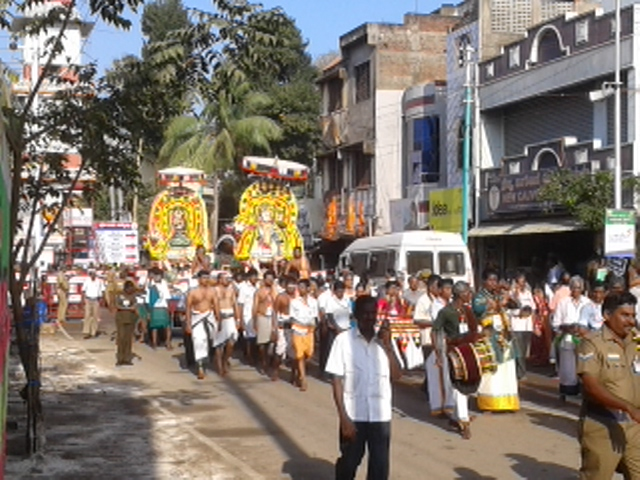
Mahamaham festival includes events such as chariot processions

Masi Maham is an annual event celebrated in Kumbakonam during the Tamil month of Masi (February–March) under the star Makham. Pilgrims gather at the Mahamaham tank ro participate in ritual bathing. According to tradition, sacred rivers across India are deemed to converge in the tank during this festival, making a single ritual bath (ablution) here equivalent to ablutions in all sacred rivers combined. Processional deities (utsava mūrtis) from regional temples are brought to the banks at noon for the ceremonial immersion ritual (theerthavāri). After the ritual bath, pilgrims traditionally make charitable donations (dāna). Processions of temple chariots (ter) are carried out through the city during the festival. Thousands of pilgrims gather here for this festival with the 1992 Mahamaham seeing about one million devotees.

According to tradition, nine personified river goddesses Ganges, Yamuna, Sarasvati, Sarayu, Godavari, Tungabhadra (alternately Mahanadi), Narmada, Krishna, and Kaveri—converge in this tank to be re-purified by Shiva's grace. Sculptures depicting this festival gathering can been seen in the nearby Kasi Viswanathar Temple.

An inscription on the northern bank pavilion record the practice of Tulapurshadana, the ceremonial weighing of a king against gold or precious metals or stones. The ceremony has been historically conducted during equinoxes, eclipses, and astronomical alignments such as Makara Sankranti, and the weighed material is distributed in charity.

== The tank ==
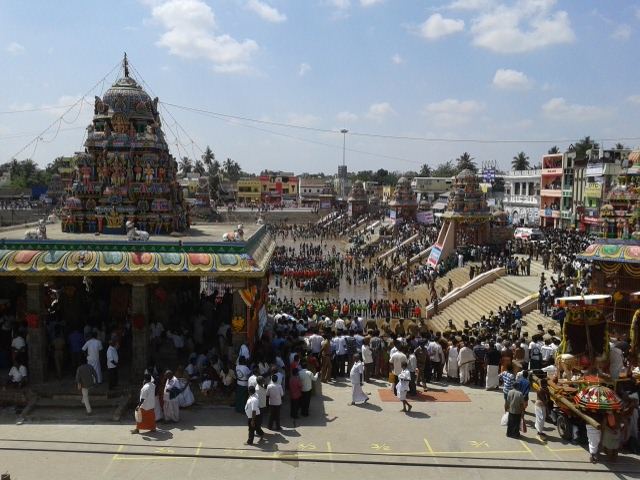
Mahamaham tank has various mandapams on its banks.

The tank is situated in central Kumbakonam, covering an area of approximately 6.2 acres (2.5 ha) within an overall 20 acres (8.1 ha) complex. Although initially designed as a square tank, infrastructure upgrades and extensions over the time have given it a trapezoidal perimeter. Stone steps line the perimeter which contains 20 wells (theerthams) and is surrounded by 16 mandapams built in 16th-century under Govinda Dikshitar, minister to Raghunatha Nayak of Thanjavur Nayak dynasty. The sixteen (shodasa linga mandapas) each house a Shiva linga representing different aspects of the deity.

=== Shodasa linga mandapas ===
The sixteen mandapas that surround the tank are dedicated to specific manifestations of Shiva:

Shodasa linga mandapas
No	Mandapa	No	Mandapa
1	Brammatheertheshwarar	9	Agasthyeshwarar
2	Mukundeshwarar	10	Vyaneshwarar
3	Dhaneshwarar	11	Umaibakeshwarar
4	Virushabeshwarar	12	Nairutheeshwarar
5	Baaneshwarar	13	Brammeshwarar
6	Koneshwarar	14	Gangatheshwarar
7	Bhakthikeshwarar	15	Mukthatheertheshwarar
8	Bhairaveshwarar	16	Shethrabaleshwarar

=== Associated Theerthams ===
The twenty sacred spring wells within the tank are named after Vedic deities, directions and rivers:

No	Name	Type	No	Name	Type
1	Vayu	Direction	11	Agni	Direction
2	Ganga	River	12	Cauvery	River
3	Bramma	Devatha	13	Yama	Devatha
4	Yamuna	River	14	Kumari	River
5	Kubera	Devatha	15	Niruthi	Direction
6	Godavari	River	16	Bayoshni	River
7	Ishana	Direction	17	Deva	Devatha
8	Narmada	River	18	Varuna	Devatha
9	Saraswathi	River	19	Sarayu	River
10	Indira	Devatha	20	Kanya	River

=== Festival rituals and associated temples ===
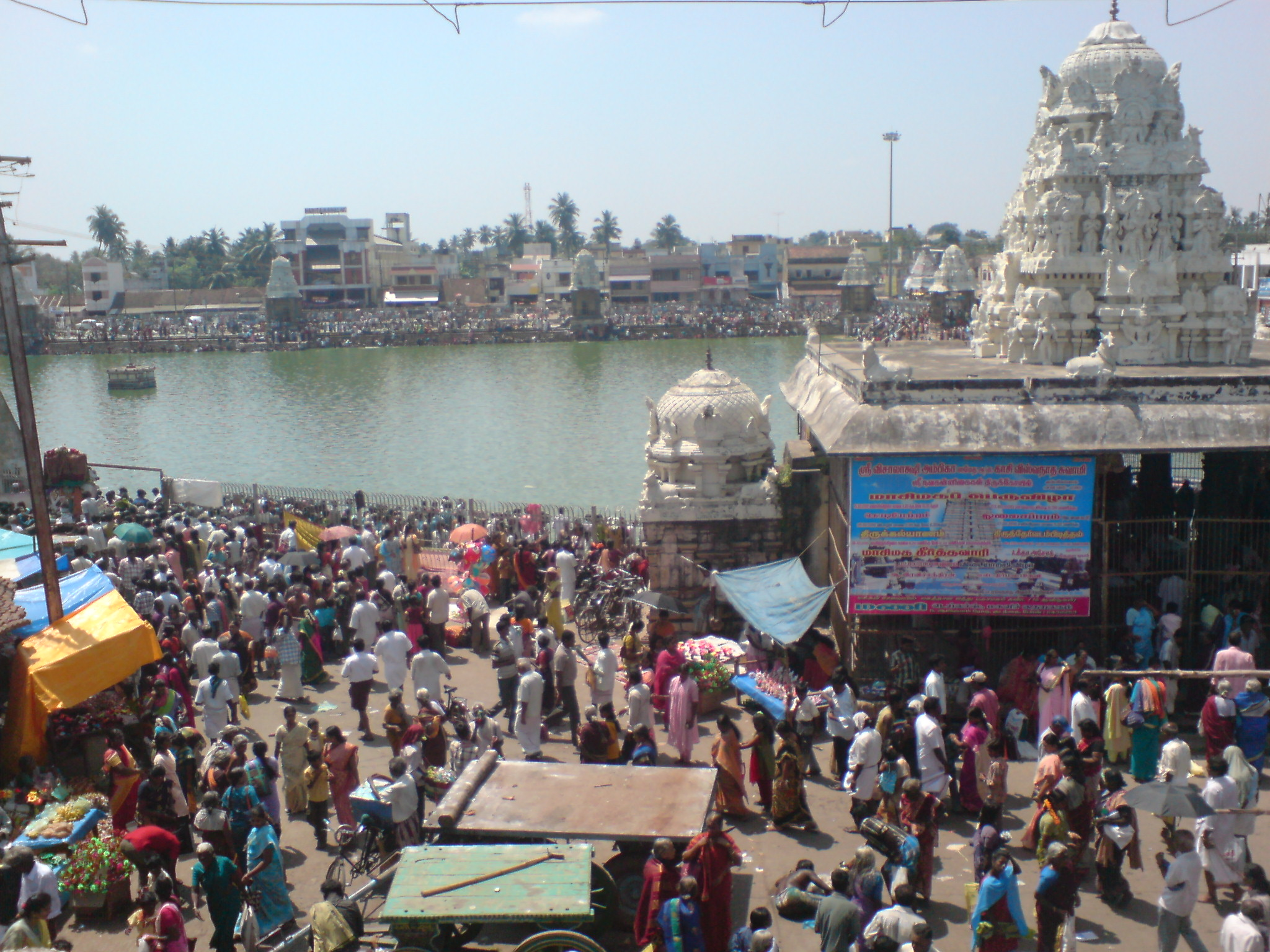
The tank and Masimaham festival

The traditional pilgrimage practice begins with worship at the region's Shiva temples, followed by ritual bathing at the tank. A more exhaustive procedure involves devotees bathing at each of the interior wells, visiting the Adi Kumbeswarar Temple and finally taking a ritual bath in the Kaveri river.

Seventeen historic templease participate in the thteerthavari festival:

- Shiva temples (12): Kasi Viswanathar Temple, Kumbeswarar Temple, Someswarar Temple, Nageswara Temple, Ekambareswarar Temple, Gowthameswarar Temple, Abimukeswarar Temple, Kambatta Visvanathar Temple, Banapuriswarar Temple, Kalahasteeswarar Temple, Koteeswarar Temple, and Amirthakalasanathar Temple.
- Vishnu temples (5): Sarangapani Temple, Chakrapani Temple, Ramaswamy Temple, Rajagopalaswamy Temple, and Varahaperumal Temple.

== 1992 stampede and infrastructure ==
During the 1992 festival, a stampede along the perimeter steps of the tank resulted in the deaths of 48 pilgrims and injuries to 74 others. There was a judicial inquiry into crowd safety, and subsequently municipal authorities introduced designated ingress and egress corridors, concrete barricades, desilting and water-recirculation systems for future festivals. The February 2016 festival drew an estimated four million devotees over its ten-day period. This time, the municipal authorities had arranged temporary transit facilities and decentralized bathing ghats across the town.

== See also ==
- Mahamaham Stampede
- Mamankam (Tirunavaya, Kerala)

== Bibliography ==
- Dictionary of Hindu Lore and Legend (ISBN 0-500-51088-1) by Anna Dallapiccola
- Ayyar, P.V. Jagadisa (1993). South Indian Shrines Illustrated. New Delhi: Asian Educational Services. ISBN 81-206-0151-3.
- Bansal, Sunita Pant (2008), Hindu Pilgrimage: A Journey Through the Holy Places of Hindus All Over India, Delhi: Hindology Books, ISBN 978-81-223-0997-3
- S., Gajarani (2004), History, Religion and Culture of India, Vol.3, New Delhi: Isha Books, ISBN 81-8205-061-8
- V., Vriddhagirisan (1995), Nayaks of Tanjore, New Delhi: Asian Educational Services, ISBN 81-206-0996-4.
- "VHP scare at holy dip". The Telegraph India. 8 March 2004.
