= Mahamaham tank =

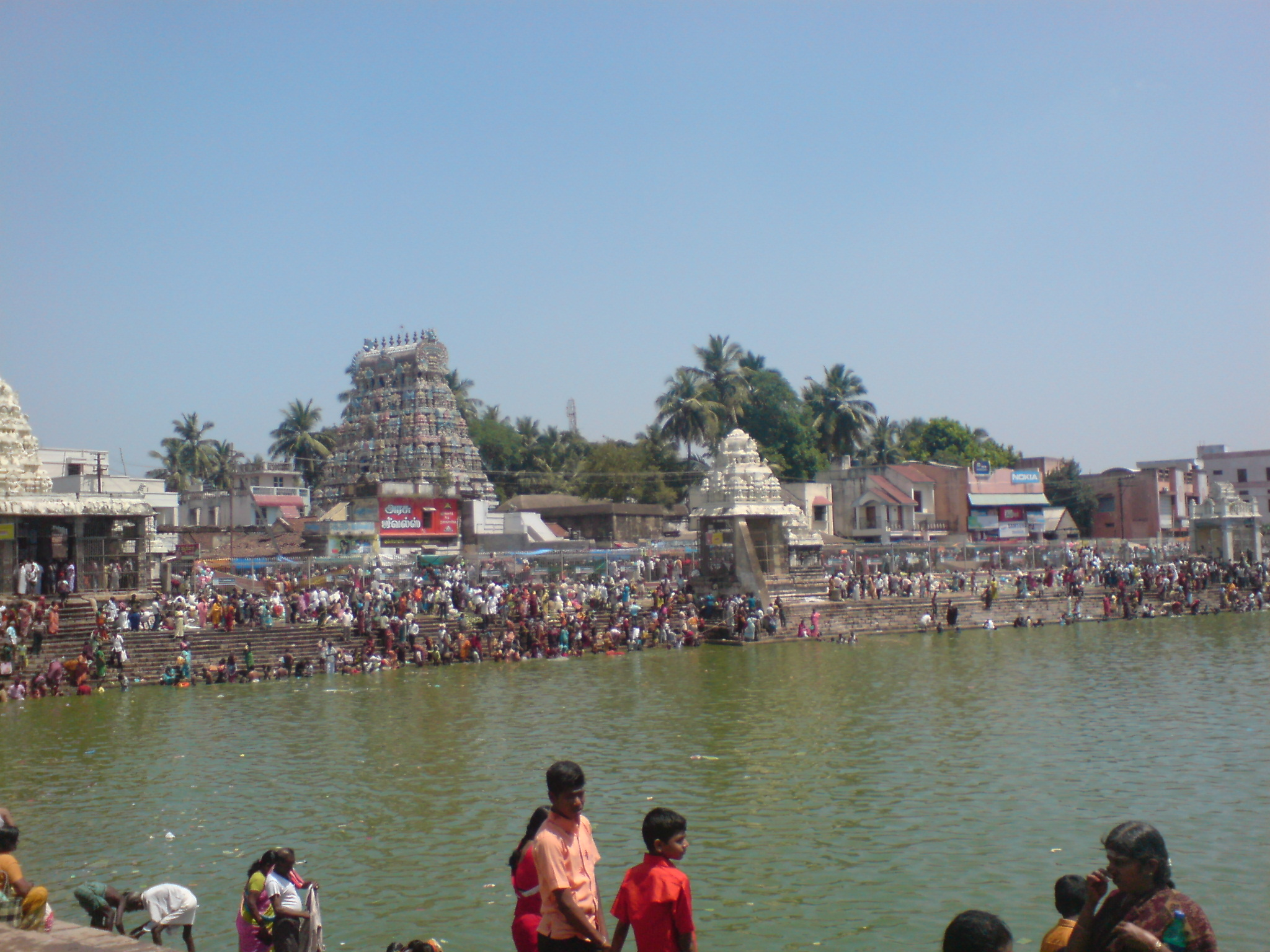
- Mahamaham tank

- Location in Tamil Nadu, India
- 10.9558°N 79.3817°E
- Location: Kumbakonam, Tamil Nadu, India

Site notes
- Architectural style: Dravidian architecture

Mahamaham tank is a huge temple tank located in Kumbakonam, Tamil Nadu, India. It is considered to be the foremost and one of the largest temple tanks in Tamil Nadu. The Masimaham festival held in the tank has 100,000 visitors and the once-in-12-year Mahamaham festival has close to 2 million visitors.

== Legend ==
In the northern bank mandapa, there is an inscription of Tula-purusha-dana, a practise of weighing oneself against gold. The ceremony is observed during various times like equinoxes, commencement of an era (Yuga) and its ending, eclipses and Makara Sankranti. The ceremony is usually performed in sacred places like temples, rivers and tanks. The amount of gold thus weighed is distributed among deserving men. As per Hindu legend, after the end of each era, the whole world immerses in a deluge on account of the wrath of Hindu god Shiva for the sins committed by humans in earth. Brahma, the Hindu god of creation, recreated the world during the start of current Kali Yuga (Iron Age). Shiva declared that after the end of previous era, a divine pot would reach a holy spot. As the divine pot reached Kumbakonam, Shiva, in the form of a hunter, broke the pot with an arrow. The pot broke into many parts and scattered around, which became the cause for so many temples in the town – Kumbeswara, Someswara, Kasi Viswanatha, Nageswara, Kamata Viswanatha, Abimukeshwara, Goutameswara, Banapuriswara, Varahar, Lakshminaryana, Sarangapani, Chakrapani and Varadharaja. Brahma prayed to Shiva to allow pilgrims to visit the tank during the sacred occasion. Shiva acceded to the demand and is believed to arrive along with Vishnu and other celestial deities at the centre of the tank. Astronomically, when the planet Jupiter passes over Leo on the day of the festival, it is believed to bring all water bodies together and enrich the tank with minerals. Similarly, a lake in Kotihar in Jammu and Kashmir gets full supply of water the same day, which otherwise remains empty during the other 11 years. Since Brahma reconstructed the world after the last deluge, there is a temple dedicated to him in Kumbakonam, though he is cursed not to have any temple for him anywhere else.

== History ==
The antiquity of the Mahamaham is deduced from the architectural and epigraphical patterns. The ceiling of the Gangatirtha mandapam carries the sculptural representation of Tulapurushardava. It is believed that Govinda Dikshitar subjected himself to the event and donated the gold to the building of the sixteen mandapas. The visit of Krishandevaraya during 1445 is recorded in an inscription in the gopuram of Nagalpuram, a village in Chengalpattu district. That Krishnadevaraya visited the event is also recorded in the inscription found in the Shiva temple in Kuthalam.

== Architecture ==
The tank is located in the heart of Kumbakonam town. It covers an area of 21 acres (8.5 ha) and is trapezoidal in shape. The tank is surrounded by sixteen small Mandapams (shrines) and has 21 wells inside the tank. The names of the wells carry the name of Hindu god Shiva or that of Rivers of India. Govinda Dikshitar, the chieftain of Ragunatha Nayak of Thanjavur, constructed the sixteen Mandapams and stone steps around this tank.

== List of mandapams and wells inside the tank ==
Brahmatheerthesar, Mukunthar, Thalesar, Rishakesar, Umaipakesar, Nairuthesar, Brahmeesar, Gangatheerthesar and Seshtra Paleesar, are the names of deities located in these Mandapams.

There are 21 wells inside the tank in the shape of small spring wells. Beginning the eastern side of the tank, there are 8 wells in the name of celestial deities namely Indra, Yama, Agani, Ninruthi, Vayu, Kubena and Isana respectively. In between the Vayu and Kubera wells, the ninth well is located called Brahma Theertham. Commencing from the north of Vayu Theertham, and ending to the little east of it, there are nine wells indicating the holy rivers of India, namely the Ganges, Yamuna, Godavari, Narmada, Saraswathi, Kaveri, Tungabatra, Krishna and Sarayu. At the centre of all these exists the Sixty-six crore theertham, believed to be the most sacred of all.

Name of Theertham	Associated Deity
Vayu Theertham	Vayu (Air)
Ganga Theertham	Ganga (River)
Brahma Theertham	Lord Brahma
Yamuna Theertham	Yamuna (River)
Kubera Theertham	Kubera (Celestial Deity)
Godavari Theertham	Godavari (River)
Eshana Theertham	Shiva
Narmada Theertham	Narmada (River)
Saraswathi Theertham	Saraswati (Deity)
Indira Theertham	Indra (Celestial Deity)
Agni Theertham	Agni (Fire)
Cauvery Theertham	Cauvery (River)
Yama Theertham	Yama (Celestial Deity)
Kumari Theertham	Parvathi (Goddess)
Niruthi Theertham	Parvathi (Goddess)
Bayoshini Theertham	Parvathi (Goddess)
Deva Theertham	Shiva (God)
Varunai Theertham	Varuna (Celestial Deity)
Sarayu Theertham	Sarayu (River)
Kanya Theertham	Parvathi (Goddess)

== Mahamaham festival ==
Masimaham is an annual event that occurs in the Tamil month of Masi (February–March) in the star of Magam. Once in twelve years, when the planet Guru (Jupiter) enters the sign Siṃha (Leo), the Kumbh mela festival of South India is celebrated at Mahamaham tank. Vast crowds gather at Kumbakonam to have a dip in the tank, along with saints and philosophers. All the rivers of India are believed to meet at the tank on this day and a purificatory bath at this tank on this day is considered equal to the combined dips in all the holy rivers of India Festival deities from all the temples in Kumbakonam arrive at the tank and at noon, all the deities bathe along with the devotees – it is called "Theerthavari". The purificatory bath is believed to remove sins and after the dip, pilgrims offer charitable gifts in the hope of being rewarded in the current life and subsequent lives. Historians view the continuity of the temple festivals as a test of time to reinforce continuity with the past. The temple cars of major temples in Kumbakonam come around the city on the festival night. During the Mahamaham of 1992, the number of devotees reached 1 million.

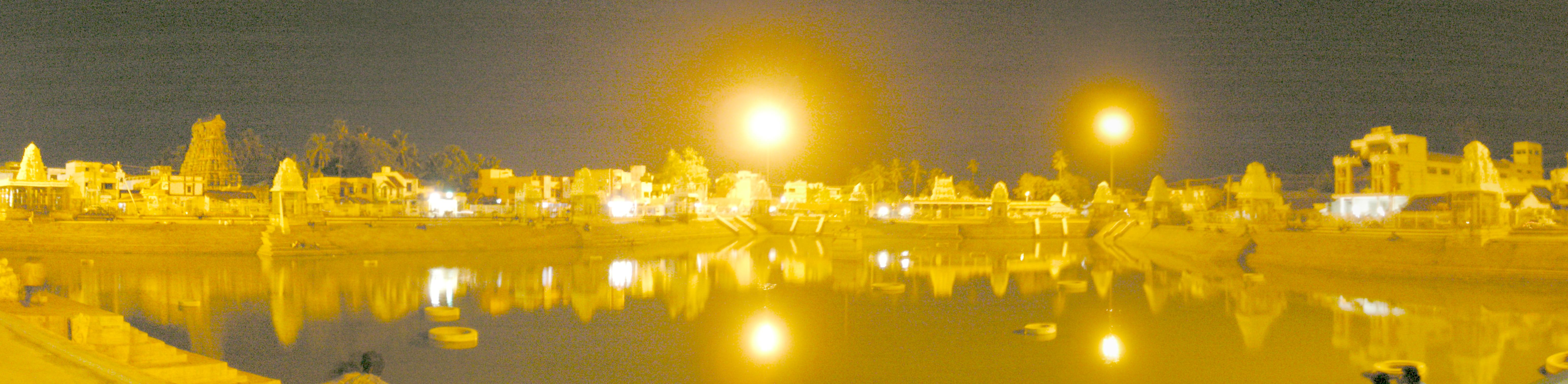
Night view of the Mahamaham tank

== Literary mention ==
Bhavishya Purana mentions the importance of Mahamaham and the importance of the festival as a narrative of Shiva to all celestial deities as under:

Let all of you this very day go to Kumbakonam, a spot dear to me and to Vishnu and bathe there is the nectar full tank created by the directions of the Parabrahman. Do bathe in the presence of Kumbesvara in Vrishaba lagna on this Mahamagam day, the full-moon day combined with Mahga star with Jupiter in the sign of Leo. Thereby you will get rid of all your accumulated sins and regain power to wipe off the sins of others

Sekkizhar, saint author of Periyapuranam notes the holy rivers as

"பூமருவும் கங்கை முதல் புனிதமாம் பெருந்தீர்த்தம்
மாமகந்தான் ஆடுவதற்கு வந்து வழி படுங்கோவில்"

meaning a dip in the holy tank on the Mahamaham day is equivalent to dip in all holy rivers and leads to worldly prosperity. Appar, the 7th-century saint poet mentions the subtle presence of holy rivers like the Ganges in the Mahamaham tank in Tiruthandakam.

தாவிமுதற் காவிரிநல் யமுனை கங்கை

சரஸ்வதிபொற் றாமரைபுட் கரணி தெண்ணீர்க்
கோவியோடு குமரிவரு தீர்த்தஞ் சூழ்ந்த

குடந்தைக்கீழ் கோட்டத்தெங் கூத்தனாரே"

== Associated temples ==
Traditionally, twelve Shiva temples and five Vishnu temples are connected with this festival. The twelve Shiva temples are Kasi Viswanathar Temple, Kumbeswarar Temple, Someswarar Temple, Nageswara Temple, Ekambareswarar Temple, Abimukeswarar Temple, Gowthameswarar Temple, Kambatta Visvanathar Temple, Banapuriswarar Temple, Kalahasteeswarar Temple, Koteeswarar Temple, and Amirthakalasanathar Temple. Of these ten temples are in Kumbakonam. The processional deities of these temples come to this tank during festival days. The five Vishnu temples are Sarangapani Temple, Chakrapani Temple, Ramaswamy Temple, Rajagopalaswamy Temple, and Varahaperumal Temple. All these temples are in Kumbakonam. The processional deities of these temples come to Cauvery during festival days.

== Gallery ==
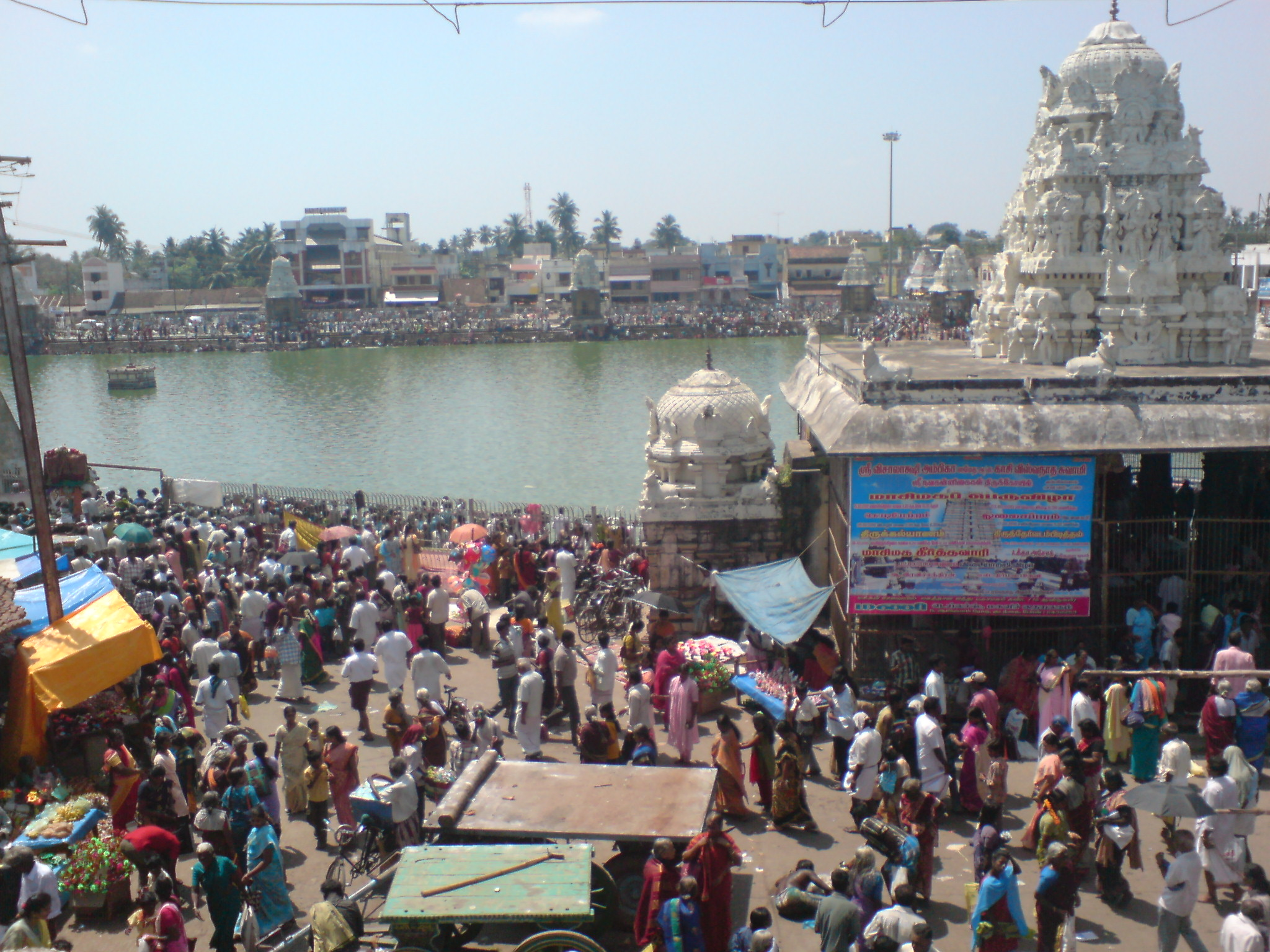
Yearly Masimagam festival at the tank

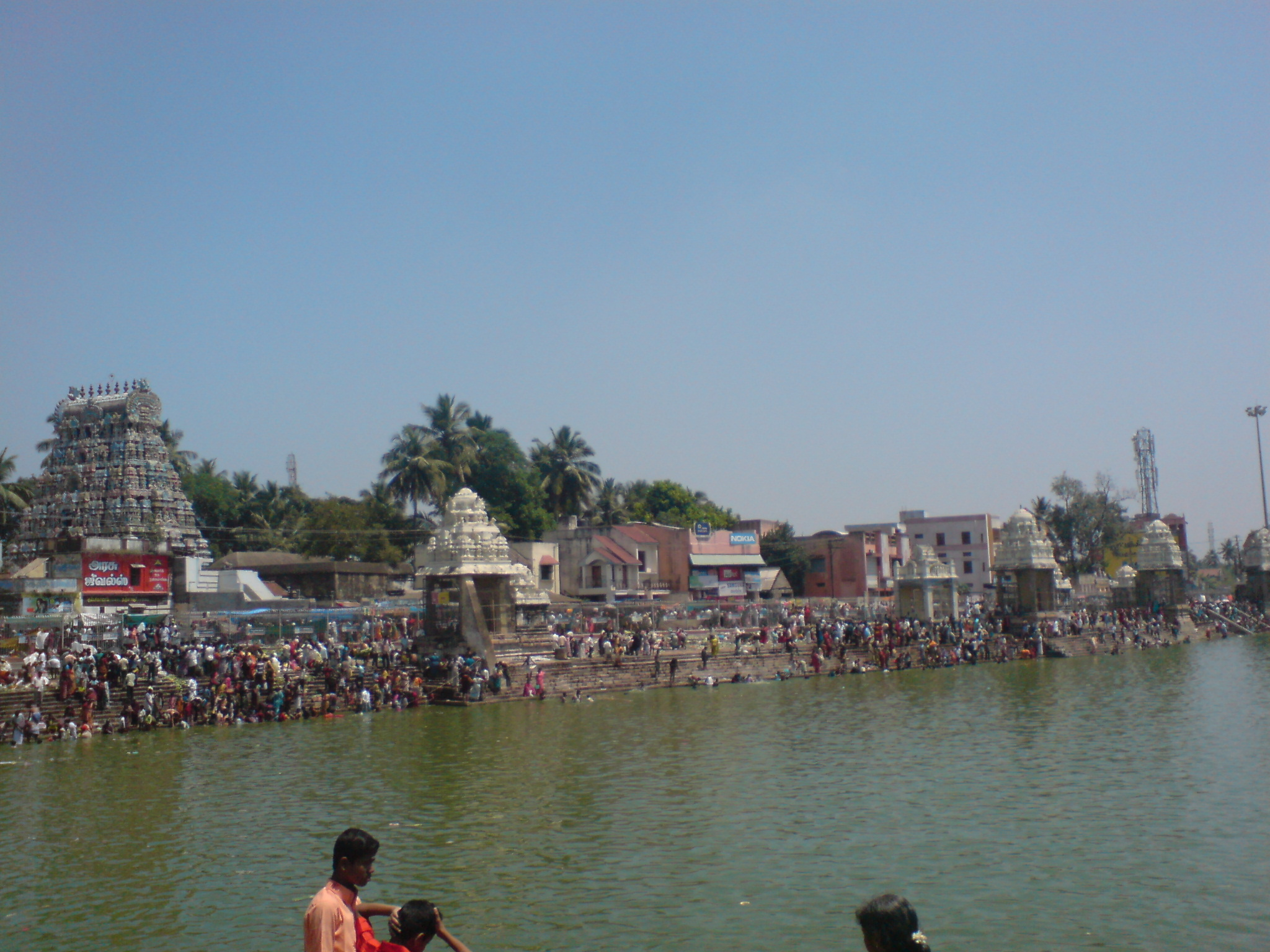
Yearly Masimagam festival at the tank

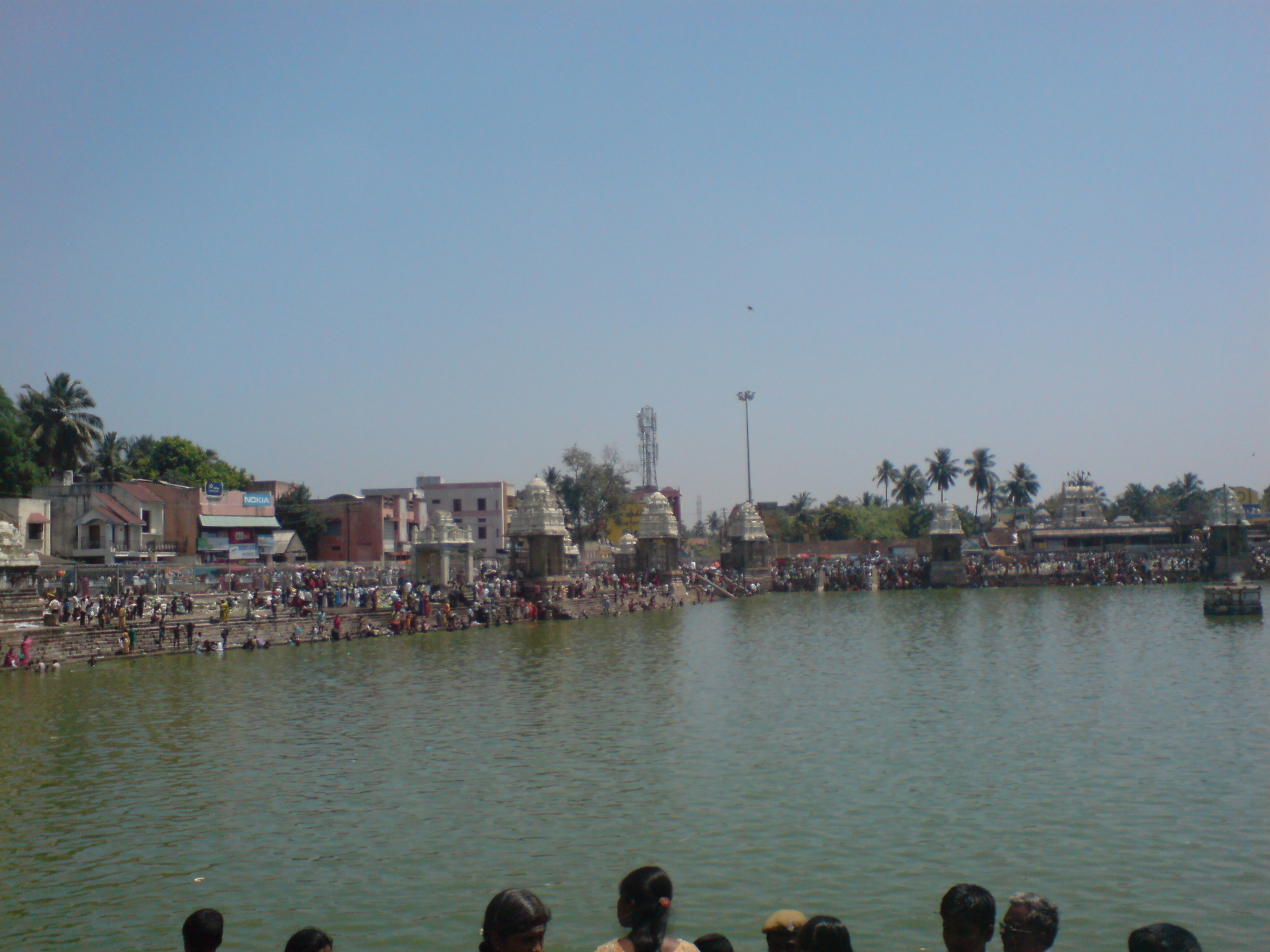
Yearly Masimagam festival at the tank

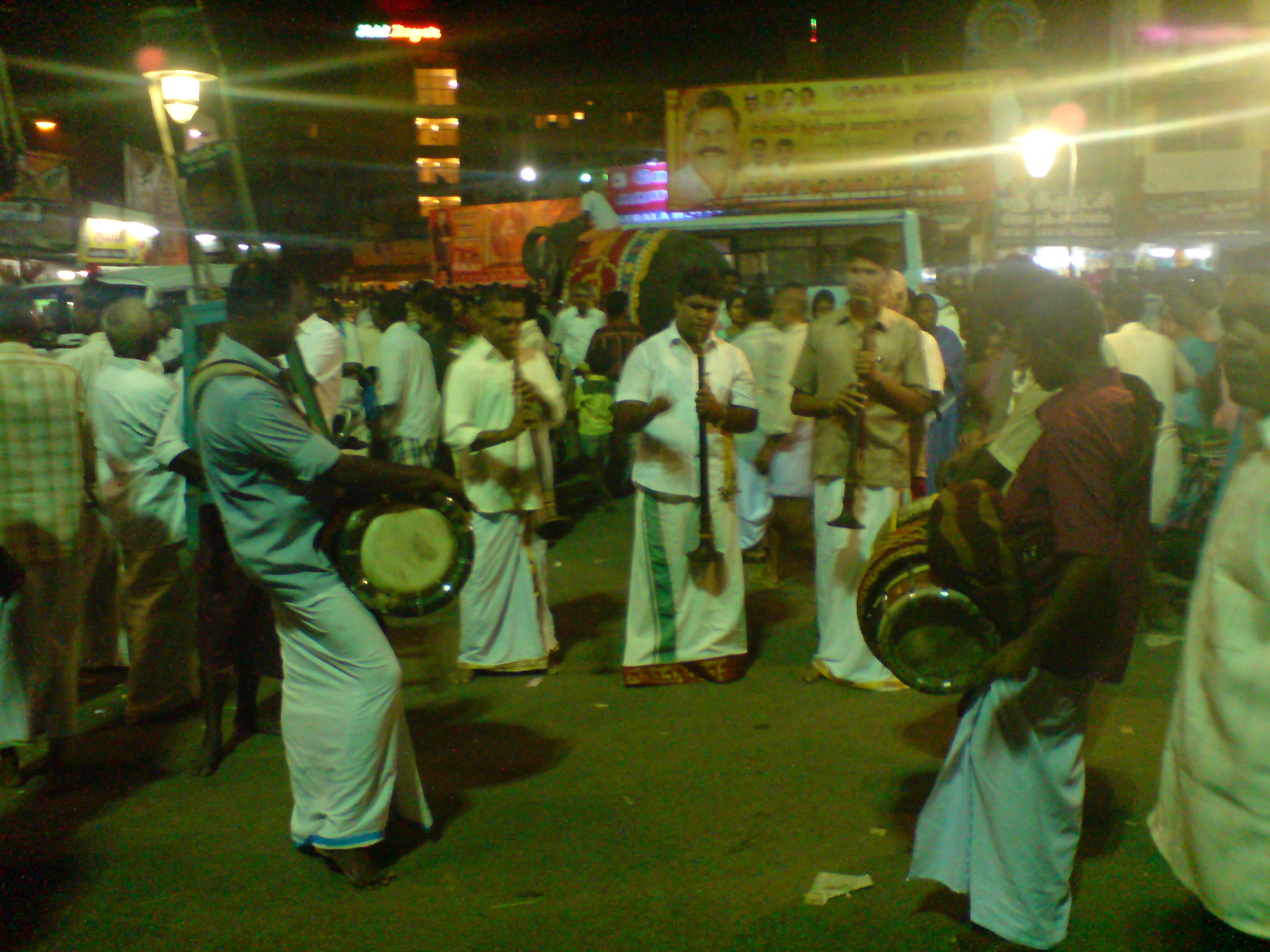
Percussions

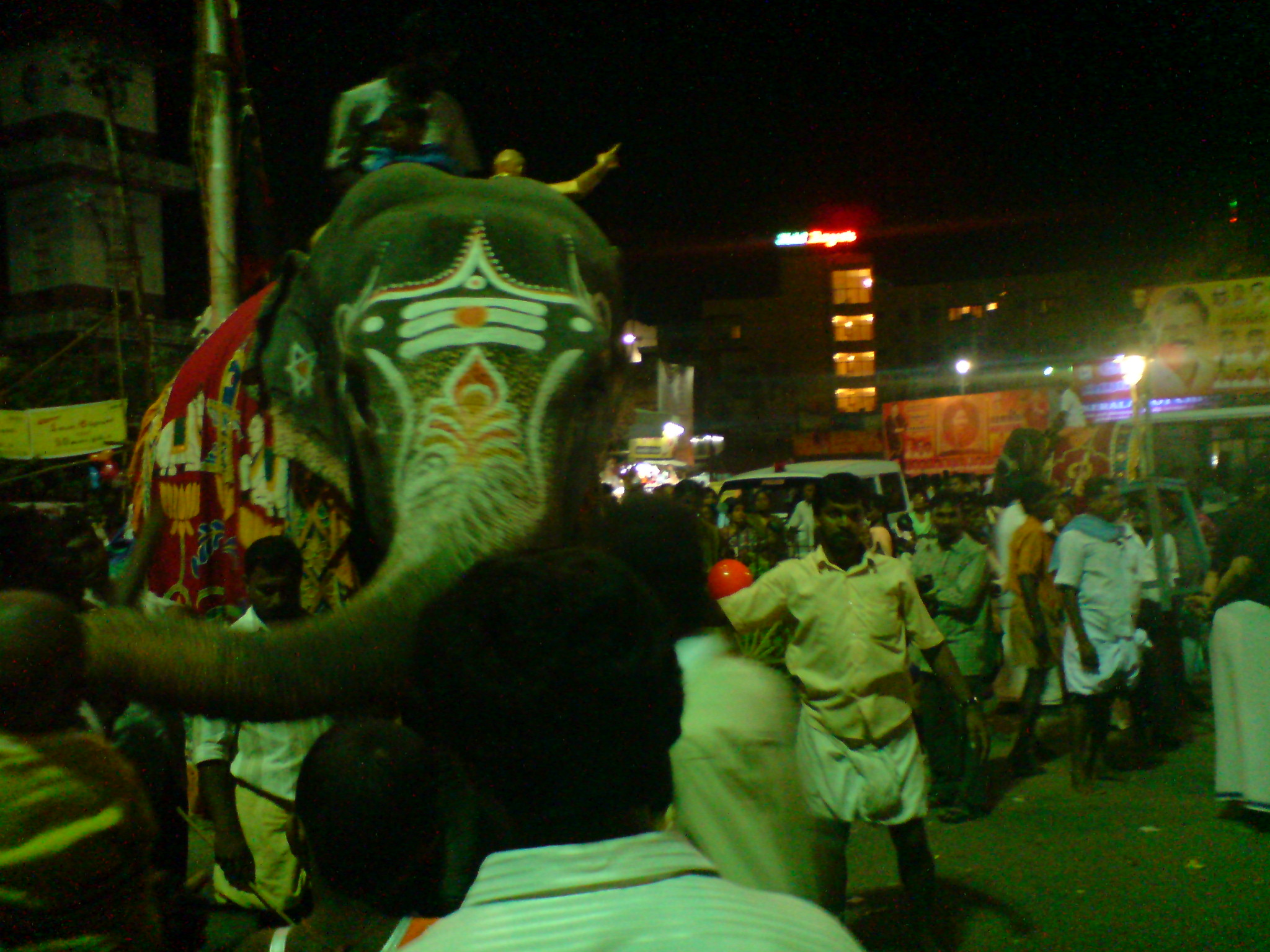
Elephant procession

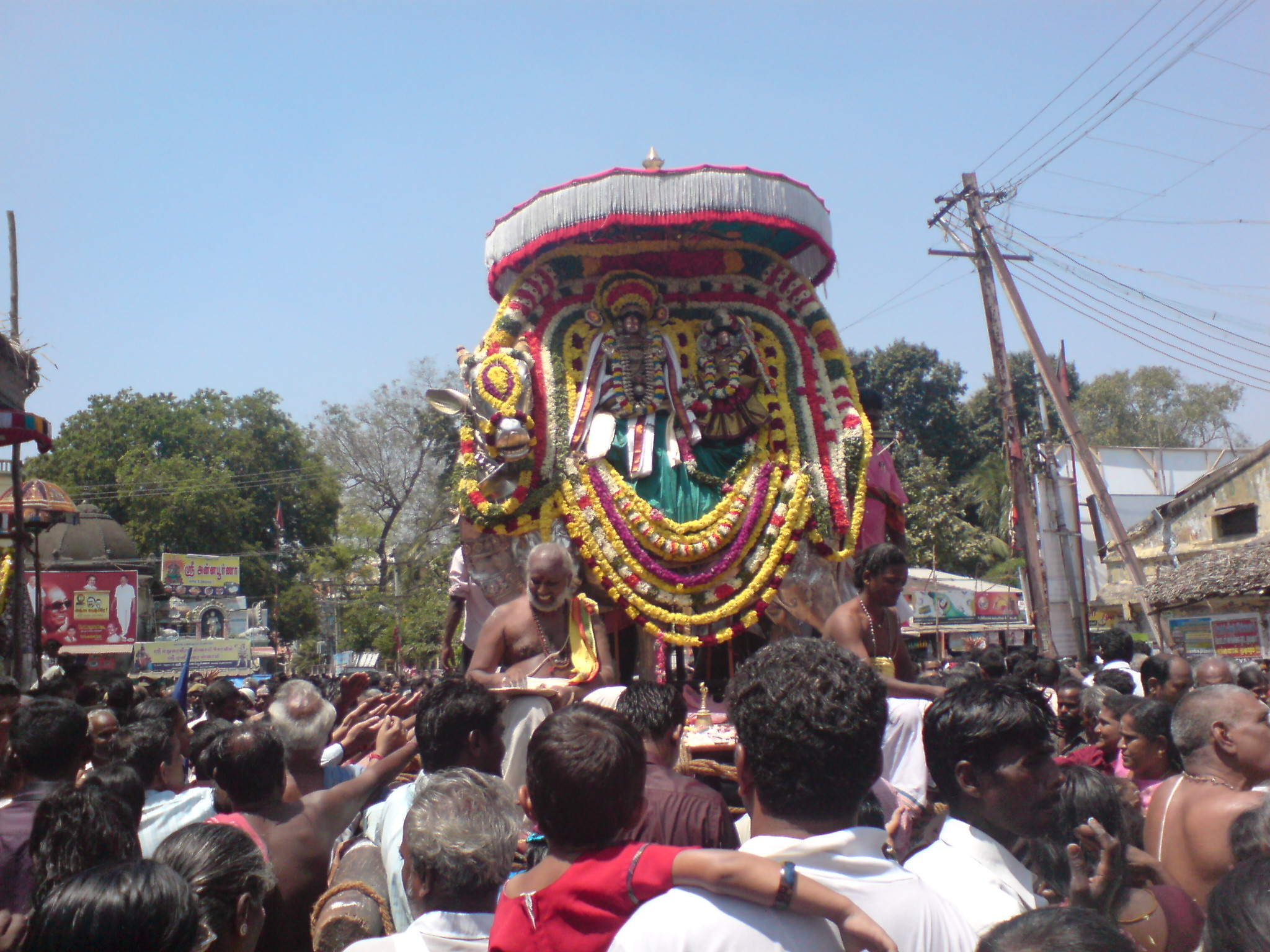
Kumbeswarar Procession

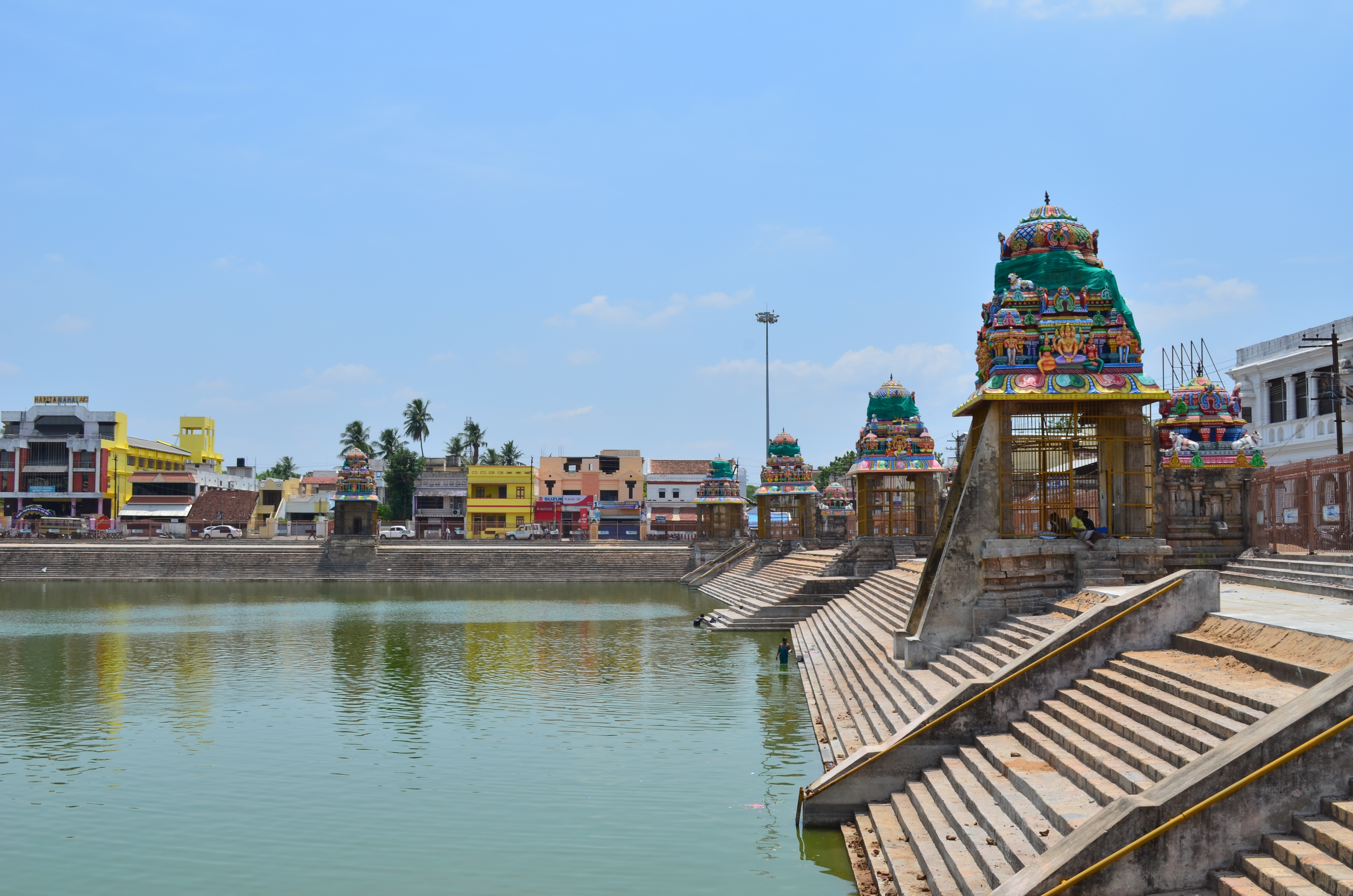
Kumbakonam Mahamaham tank on a regular day

== See also ==
- Mahamaham Stampede
