= Adi Kumbeswarar Temple, Kumbakonam =

Hindu temple in Tamil Nadu, India

Adi Kumbeswarar Temple
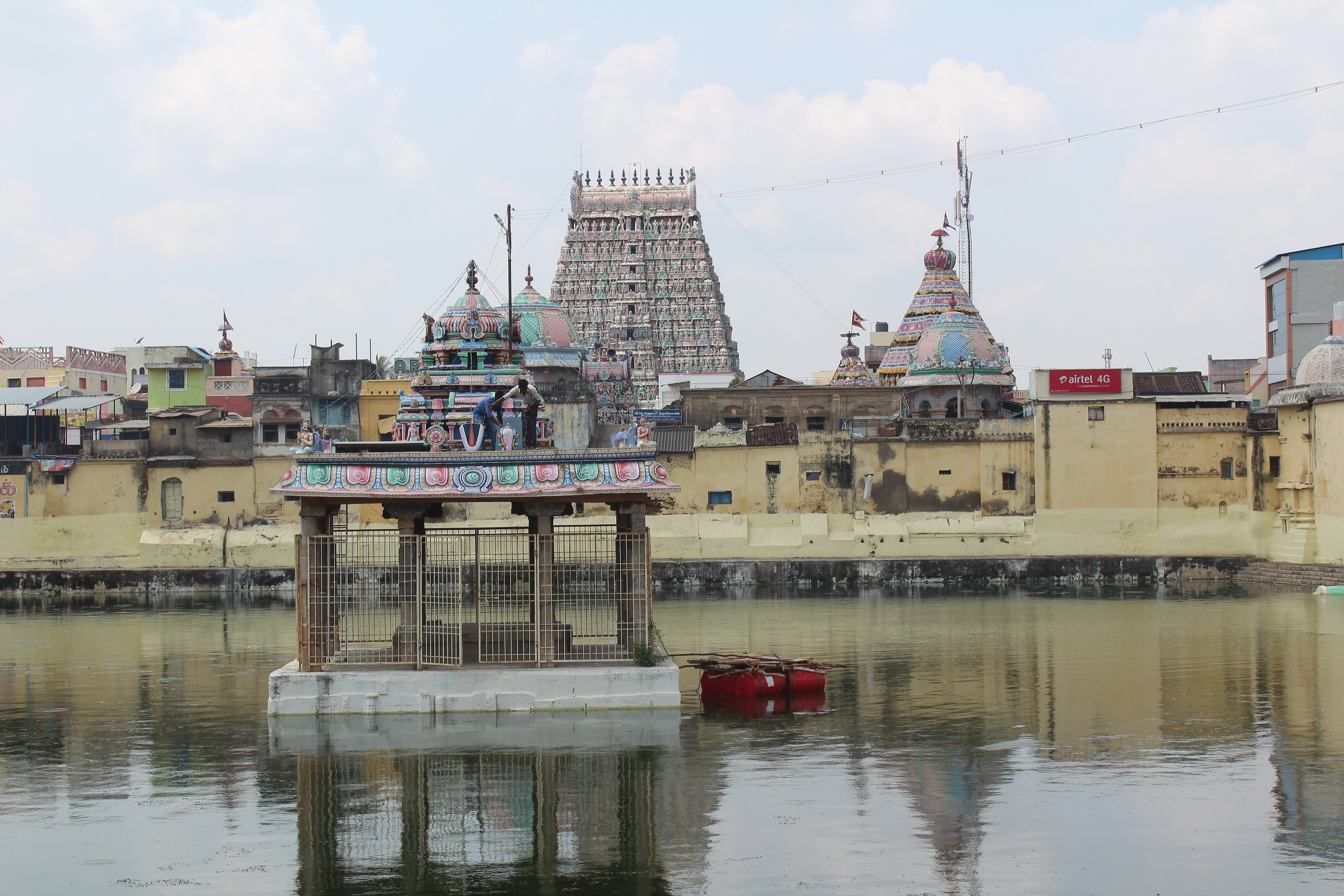

- Location in Tamil Nadu

Religion
- Affiliation: Hinduism
- District: Thanjavur
- Deity: Adi Kumbeswarar (Shiva), Mangalambigai (Parvathi)

Location
- Location: Kumbakonam
- State: Tamil Nadu
- Country: India
- Coordinates: 10°57′30″N 79°22′16″E

Architecture
- Type: Tamil architecture
- Creator: Cholas

Adi Kumbeswarar Temple, Kumbakonam is a Hindu temple to Shiva in the town of Kumbakonam in Thanjavur District, Tamil Nadu, India. Shiva is worshiped as Adi Kumbeswarar, and is represented by the lingam. His consort Parvati is depicted as Mangalambigai Amman. The presiding deity is mentioned in the 7th-century-CE Tamil Saiva canonical work the Tevaram and it is classified as Paadal Petra Sthalam.

The temple complex covers an area of 30,181 sq ft (2,803.9 m^{2}) and houses four gateway towers known as gopurams. The tallest is the eastern tower, with 11 stories and a height of 128 feet (39 m) The temple has numerous shrines, with those of Kumbeswarar and Mangalambigai Amman being the most prominent. The temple complex houses many halls; the most notable is the sixteen-pillared hall built during the Vijayanagara period that has all the 27 stars and 12 zodiacs sculpted in a single stone.

The masonry structure was built during the Chola dynasty in the 9th century, while later expansions are attributed to Vijayanagara rulers of the Thanjavur Nayaks of the 16th century. The temple is maintained and administered by the Hindu Religious and Charitable Endowments Department of the Government of Tamil Nadu.

== Legend ==
The name of the town Kumbakonam is derived from the legend associated with Kumbeswarar Temple. The pot (kumbha) is said to be of Brahma that contained the seed of all living beings on earth. The kumbha is believed to have been displaced by a pralaya (dissolution of the universe) effected by Shiva's arrow and ultimately came to rest at the spot where the town of Kumbakonam now stands. The nectar is believed to have fallen in two places - the Mahamaham tank and the Potramarai tank. This event is now commemorated in the Mahamaham festival held every 12 years. Kumbakonam was also formerly known by the Tamil name of Kudamukku. Kumbakonam is also identified with the Sangam age settlement of Kudavayil.

== History ==
The temple is in existence from Chola times of the 9th century, and has been maintained by Nayaks during the 15-17th century. In modern times, the temple is maintained and administered by the Hindu Religious and Charitable Endowments Department of the Government of Tamil Nadu.

== Architecture ==
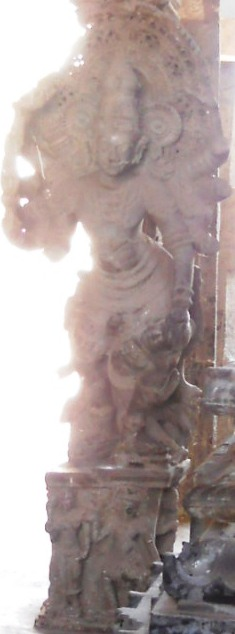
Sculpture inside the temple

Kumbeswarar temple complex covers an area of 30,181 sq ft (2,803.9 m^{2}) and houses four gateway towers known as gopurams. The tallest is the eastern tower, with 11 stories and a height of 128 feet (39 m) The temple is approached by a corridor 330 ft (100 m) long and 15 ft (4.6 m) wide. There are five silver-plated chariots in the temple used to carry the temple deities during festive occasions. The temple is the largest Shiva temple of Kumbakonam and has a 9-storeyed rajagopuram (gateway tower) 125 ft tall It is spread over 4 acres in the centre of the town. The temple has 3 concentric compounds, elongated along an east–west axis has triple set of gopurams.

Adi Kumbeswarar is the presiding deity of the temple and the shrine is located in the centre. Kumbeswarar is in the form a lingam believed to have been made by Shiva himself when he mixed nectar of immortality and sand. Manthrapeeteswari Mangalambika is his consort and her shrine is present parallel to the left of Kumbeswarar shrine. The temple has a colonnaded hall and a good collection of silver vahanas (sacred vehicles used to carry deities during festival processions) Beyond the flagstaff, a hallway whose columns feature painted brackets representing yali (a mythological creature) leads to the gopuram. The Navaratri Mandapam (Hall of Navratri celebration) has 27 stars and 12 rasis (constellations) carved in a single block. The idol of Subramanya having six hands instead of 12, stone nadasvarams (pipe instrument) and Kiratamurti are main attractions of the temple.

The central shrine of the temple houses the image of Adi Kumbheswarar in the form of lingam The shrine of Mangala Nayaki is located parallel to the left of Kumbeswarar and Somaskanda is located to the right. The images of Nalvars (Appar, Sambanthar, Sundarar and Manickavasagar), images of the sixty three Nayanmars, Virabhadra, Saptakannikas, Visalakshi, Visvanatha, Valam Chuzhi Vinayaka, Bhikshatana, Karthikeya, Annapurani, Gajalakshmi, Mahalakshmi, Saraswathi, Jasta Devi, Durga, Chandikesa, Kuratirtha, Arukala Vinayakar, Nandi, bali pitham, Sabha Vinayaka, Kasi Visvanatha, Nataraja are located in the first precinct around the sanctum. The temple also has images of Navaneetha Vinayaka, Kiratamurti, Bhairava, Jvarahareswara, Chaota Sri Govinda Dikshits-Nagammal, Chandra, Surya, Adikara Nandhi (the sacred bull of Shiva), Vallabha Ganapathi, Shanmukha, Navagraha (nine planetary deities), Nandhi, Lakshmi Narayana Perumal, Mutra Veli Vinayaka, Bala Dandayutapani, Nandhi, Vanni Vinayakar, Kumbha Munisiddhar, Kumarappar, Adilinga and Sattananthar. Chamber of repose, decoration hall, Sacrificial hall, grand kitchen, marriage hall, elephant shed, Vasantamandapam, cattle shed, garden and four-pillared hall are other notable parts in the temple. The flag mast is located in the second precinct, directly on the axis of the presiding deity.

The Mahamaham tank, Potramarai Tirtha, Varuna Tirtha, Kasyapa Tirtha, Chakkara Tirtha, Matanga Tirtha and Bhagavad Tirtha (bathing ghats along the river Cauvery) are the seven outlying water bodies associated with the temple. Mangala Kupam Asva, Naga tirtha, Kura tirtha are the three wells, while Chandra tirtha, Surya tirtha, Gautama tirtha and Varaha tirtha are the four tanks located inside the temple. The Potramarai tank separates the Kumbeswarar temple from Sarangapani temple.

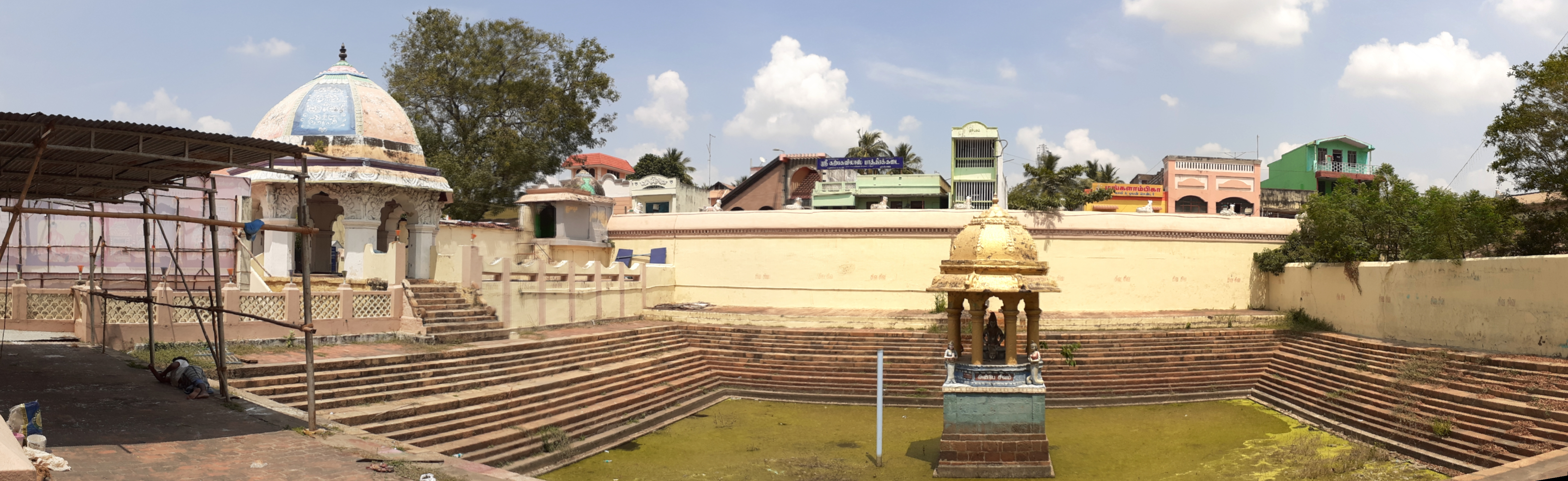
Panoramic image of the temple tank

== Festivals ==
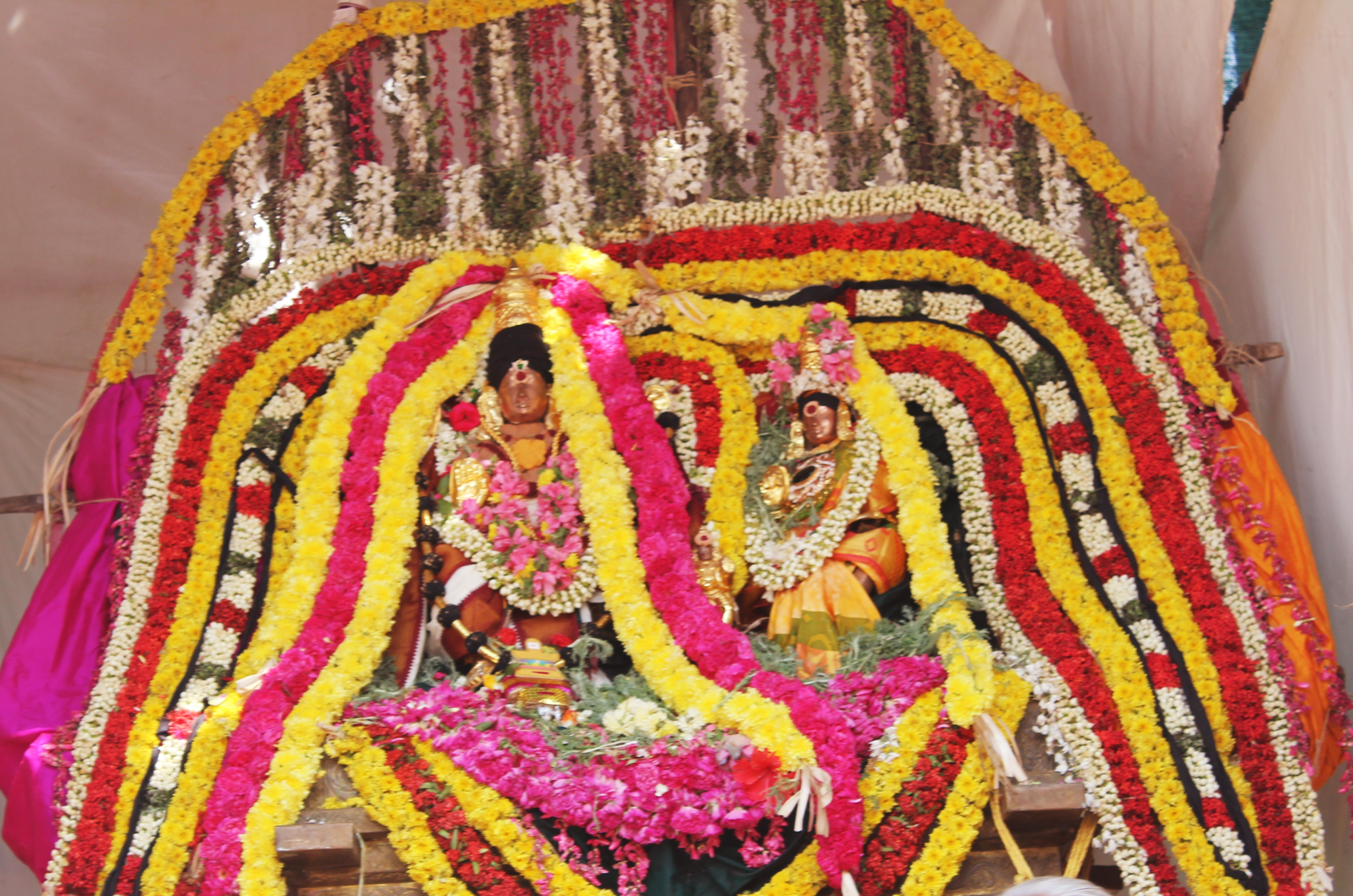
Festival procession of Kumbeswarar

The Mahamaham festival takes place once every twelve years during the Tamil Month of Masi (February–March), when lakhs of pilgrims from various parts of India visit Kumbakonam to take a holy bath in the sacred Mahamaham tank which is located in the heart of the town. The festival has archaeological and epigraphical evidence. Tulapurushadaram, the practise of weighing oneself against gold and donating to the temple was effected by Govinda Dikshitar and the funds were utilised for funding the construction of the 16 mandapas around the tank. Krishnadeva Raya (1509–1529 CE) is believed to have witnessed the Mahamaham festival during this time. He made donations to the temple on this occasion is found in another inscription.

== Literary mention ==
Appar, the 7th-century Tamil Shivite poet and nayanar mentioned Kumbeswarar and the temple in his verses in Tevaram, compiled as the Fifth Tirumurai. As the temple is mentioned in Tevaram, it is classified as Paadal Petra Sthalam, one of the 276 temples in the Saiva canon. The temple is the seventh in the list of temples in the southern banks of Cauvery. Appar mentioned the temple in nine poems referring the place as Kudamuku and the deity as "Kumbesar". The mention is in the 59th poem in the Third Tirumurai by Sambandar and 22nd poem in the Fifth Tirumurai by Appar. The temple is one of the Shakta pithas where Parvathi, the consort of Shiva is consecrated as a major deity. Mangalambigai is known as Mantira Piteswari

== Photogallery ==
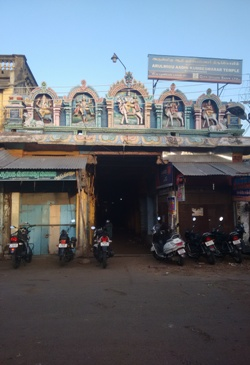
East (Main) entrance

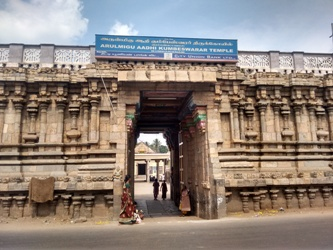
South entrance

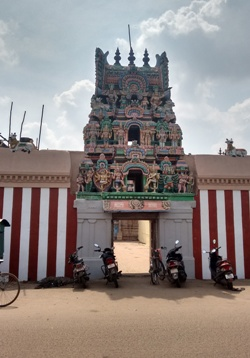
North entrance

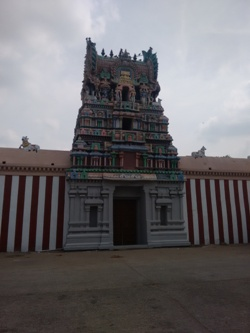
West entrance

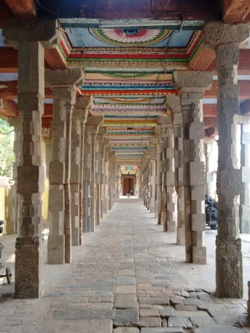
Inner mandapa

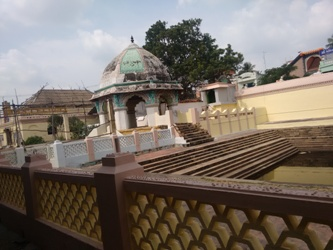
Mandapa

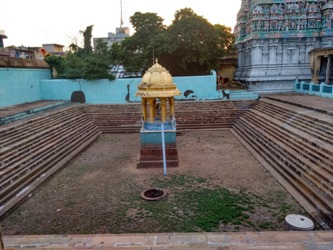
Temple tank
