= Kodeeswarar Temple =

Shiva temple in Tamil Nadu, India

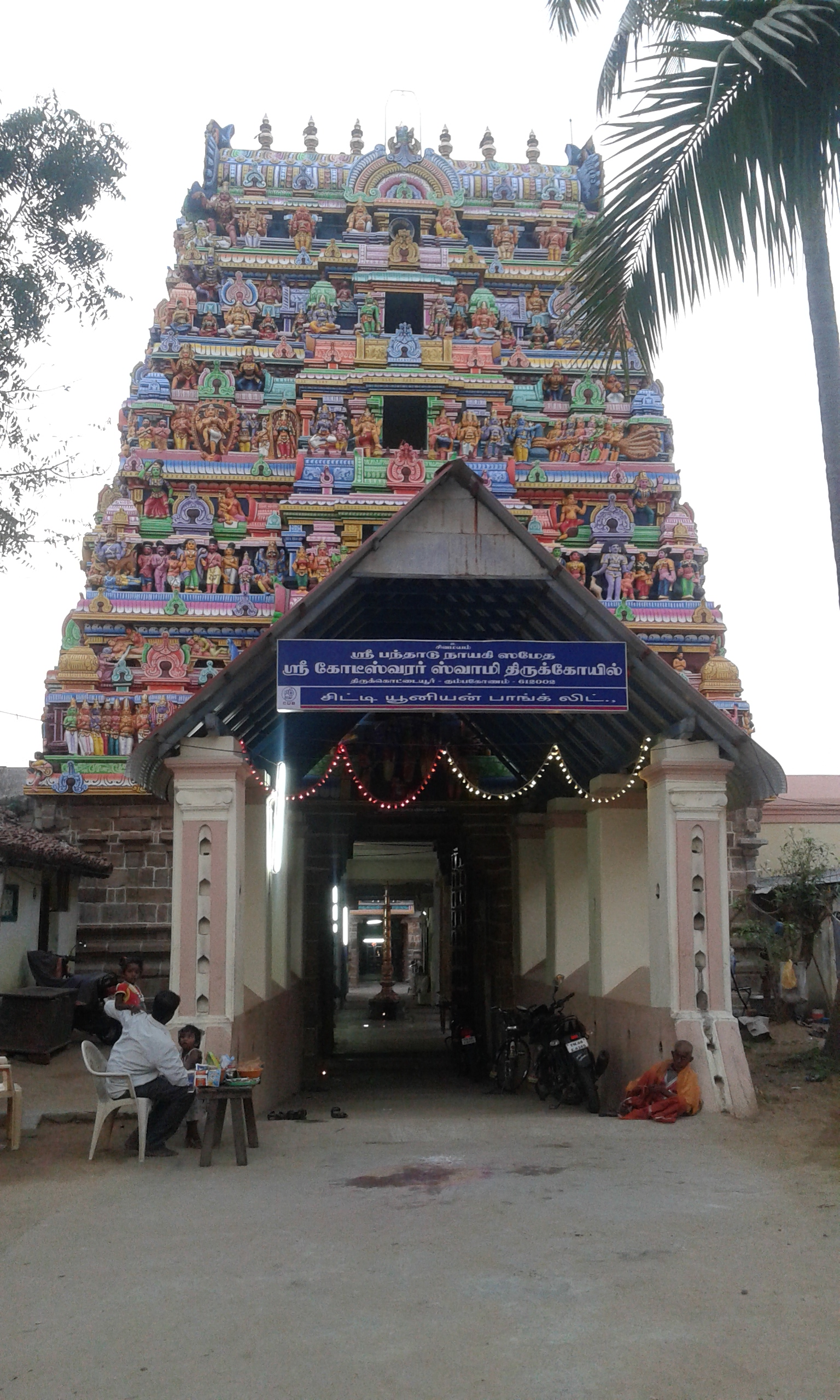
- Image of the Kodeeswarar temple gopuram

- Location in Tamil Nadu

Religion
- Affiliation: Hinduism
- District: Thanjavur
- Deity: Kodeeswarar (Shiva), Pandhadu Nayagi
- Festival: Maha Shivaratri

Location
- Location: Kottaiyur
- State: Tamil Nadu
- Country: India
- Coordinates: 10.966845°N 79.358225°E

Architecture
- Type: Dravidian architecture

Specifications
- Temple: One
- Elevation: 51.58 m (169 ft)

Kodeeswarar Temple is a Hindu temple of Shiva in Kottaiyur, a village on the western outskirts of Kumbakonam, in Thanjavur district, Tamil Nadu, India. Shiva is worshipped as Koteeswarar and his consort Parvathi as Pandhadu Nayaki. Koteeswarar is mentioned in the 7th century Tamil Saiva canonical and greatest work, Tevaram, written by Tamil saint poets known as the Nayanmars and classified as Paadal Petra Sthalam, the 275 temples mentioned in the canon.

The temple has a five-tiered Raja Gopuram, the entrance tower and all the shrines are enclosed in rectangular walls. It is maintained and administered by the Hindu Religious and Endowment Board of the Government of Tamil Nadu.

== Legend ==
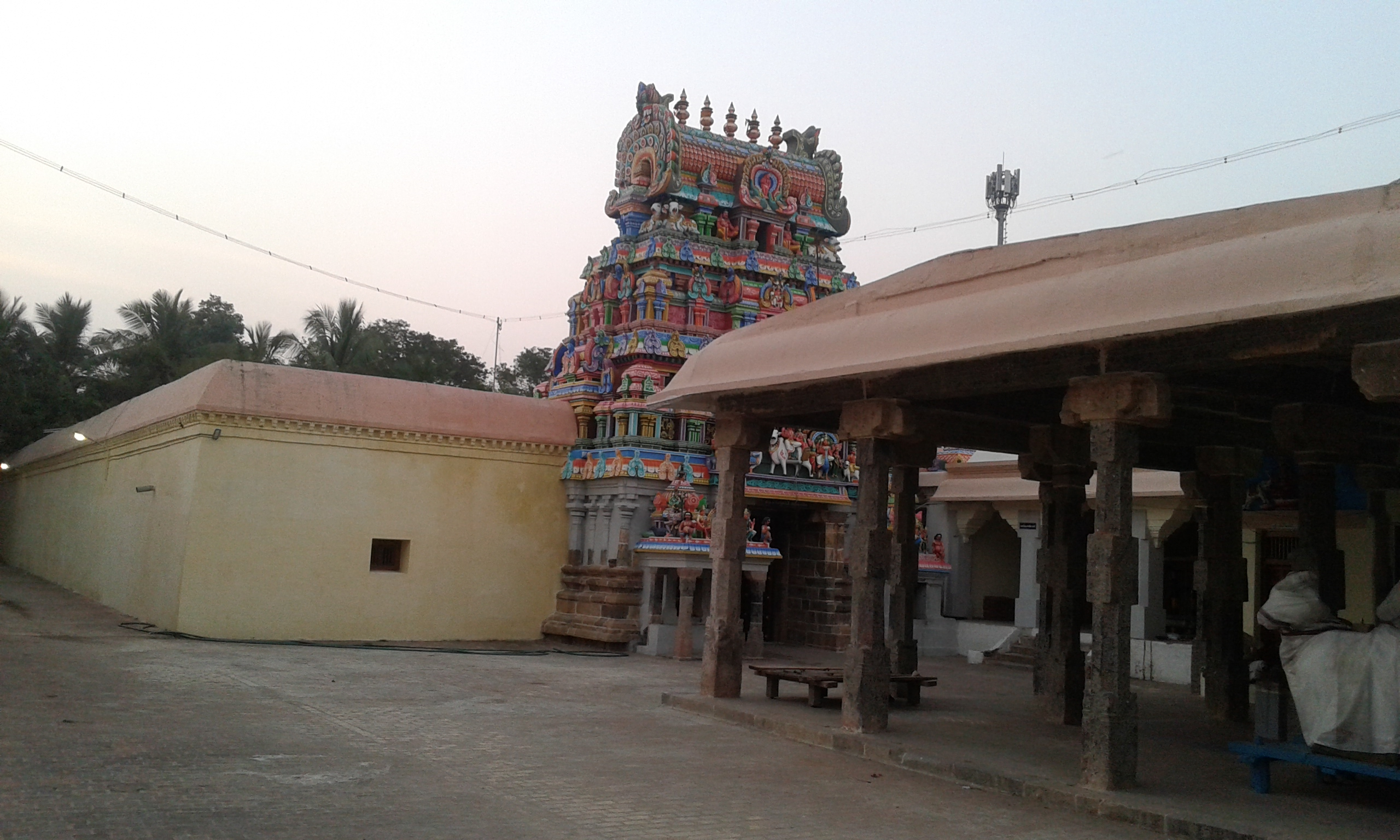
Image of entrance of the Shiva shrine

As per Hindu legend, Suruchi, the son of Sathyarthi, the ruler of Trihartha kingdom, took the form of a devil on account of a curse. On account of disfigure, people ran away on seeing him. He prayed to Shiva and was advised to take a holy dip in the spring in the temple. He got his original form and the belief is followed in modern times, where ladies take a holy dip to get a better appearance. As per another legend, sage Herandar (Athreya) is believed to have worshipped Shiva at this place. Pandhadu Nayagi, meaning Goddess playing with a ball, got her name as she is believed to toss the curses of devotees off their suffering. Shiva is believed to have appeared in ten million (called kodi in Tamil) forms of Vinayaga, Parvathi and Muruga and hence got Koteeswarar as his name.

== Architecture ==
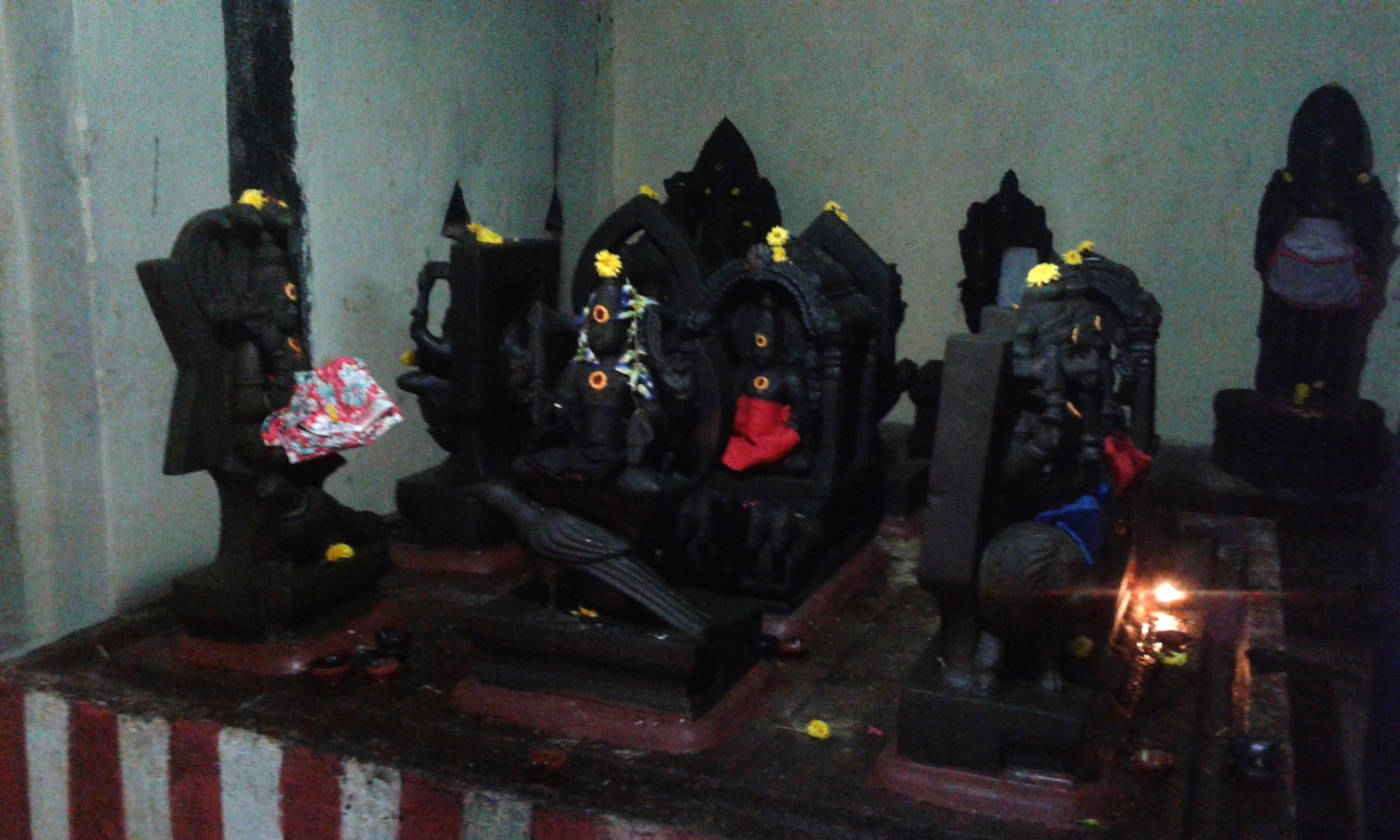
Image of Navagraha, which is unique in the temple

The temple is located 5 km (3.1 mi) north-west of Kumbakonam on the Kumbakonam–Swamimalai road. Kodeeswarar temple has a rectangular plan with two prakarams (outer courtyard) covering an area of 1 acre (0.40 ha) and a five-tiered rajagopuram (gateway tower) facing East. The central shrine faces east and houses the image of Kodeeswarar (Shiva) in the form of lingam made of granite. There is a separate shrine for Vinayagar and Murugan on both sides of the entrance to the sanctum. The granite images of Nandi (the bull and vehicle of Shiva), a tall flag staff and a Balipeeta, the place of offering, axial to the sanctum. As in other Shiva temples of Tamil Nadu, the first precinct or the walls around the sanctum of Kodeeswarar has images of Dakshinamurthy (Shiva as the Teacher), Durga (warrior-goddess) and Chandikeswarar (a saint and devotee of Shiva). The temple precinct is surrounded by granite walls. The images of Navagraha, the planetary deities is unique that they are depicted with all their chariots.

The temple is one of those on the northern bank of River Kaveri. It is one of the shrines of the 275 Paadal Petra Sthalams – Shiva Sthalams mentioned in the early medieval Tevaram poems. The Mahasamprokshanam also known as Kumbabishegam (consecration) of the temple was held on 26 October 2015.

It is one of the Saptha Stana Temples of Kumbakonam.

== Photogallery ==
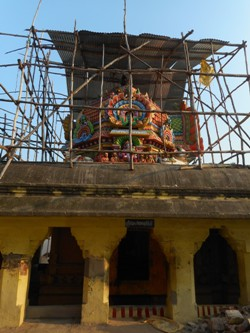
Vimana

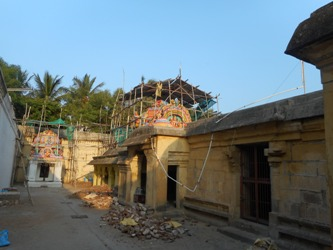
Inner prakara

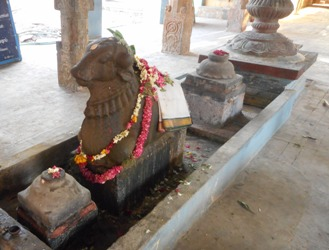
Nandhi and Balipeeta

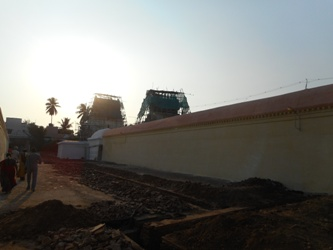
Inner prakara

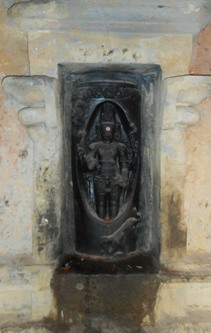
Sculpture in kosta

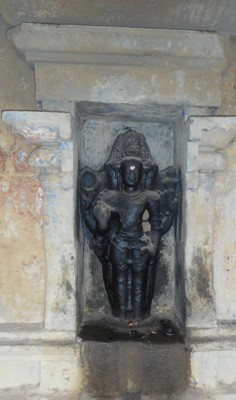
Sculpture in kosta

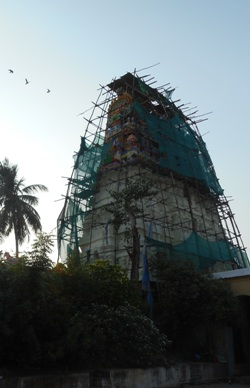
Main entrance
