= Hindu temples in Kumbakonam =

Religious structures in Tami Nadu, India

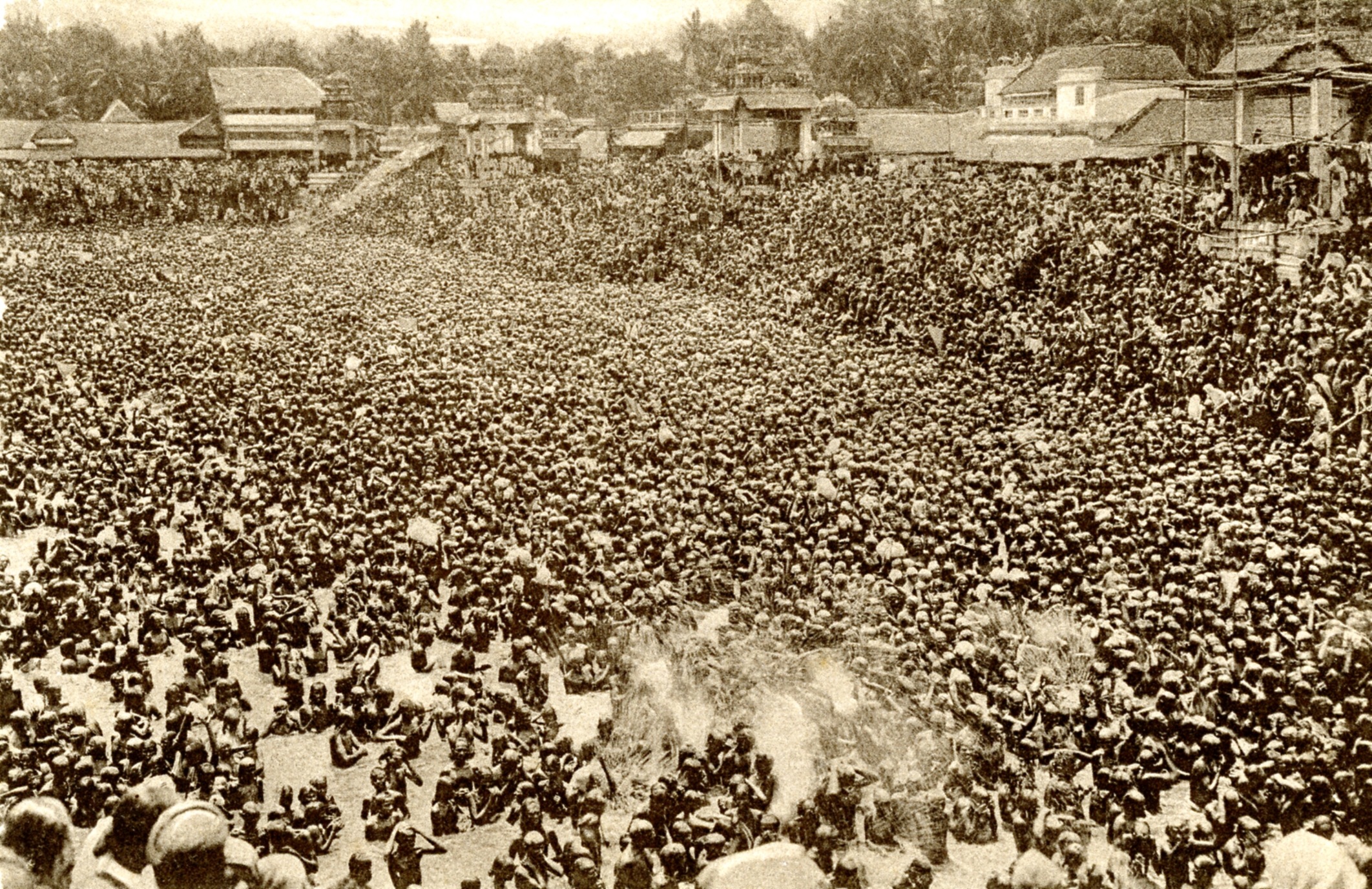
Mahamaham tank, the most famous temple tank in the town

Kumbakonam (kumpakōṇam) is a city and a municipal corporation in the Thanjavur district in the Indian state of Tamil Nadu, 40 kilometres from Thanjavur and 273 kilometres from Chennai. It is the headquarters of the Kumbakonam taluk of Thanjavur district and a temple town with many Hindu temples located in and around it, the majority dedicated to Vishnu and Shiva.

12 Shiva temples are connected with Mahamaham festival which happens once in 12 years in Kumbakonam. They are Kasi Viswanathar Temple, Kumbeswarar Temple, Someswarar Temple, Nageswara Temple, Ekambareswarar Temple, Gowthameswarar Temple, Abimukeswarar Temple, Kambatta Visvanathar Temple, Banapuriswarar Temple, Kalahasteeswarar Temple, Kumbakonam, Koteeswarar Temple, and Amirthakalasanathar Temple. Of these twelve, the first ten temples are located in Kumbakonam town itself.

Five Vishnu temples are connected with Mahamaham. They are Sarangapani Temple, Chakrapani Temple, Ramaswamy Temple, Rajagopalaswamy Temple, and Varahaperumal Temple. All five are in Kumbakonam.

== Saivite Temples in Kumbakonam ==
=== Kasi Viswanathar Temple ===
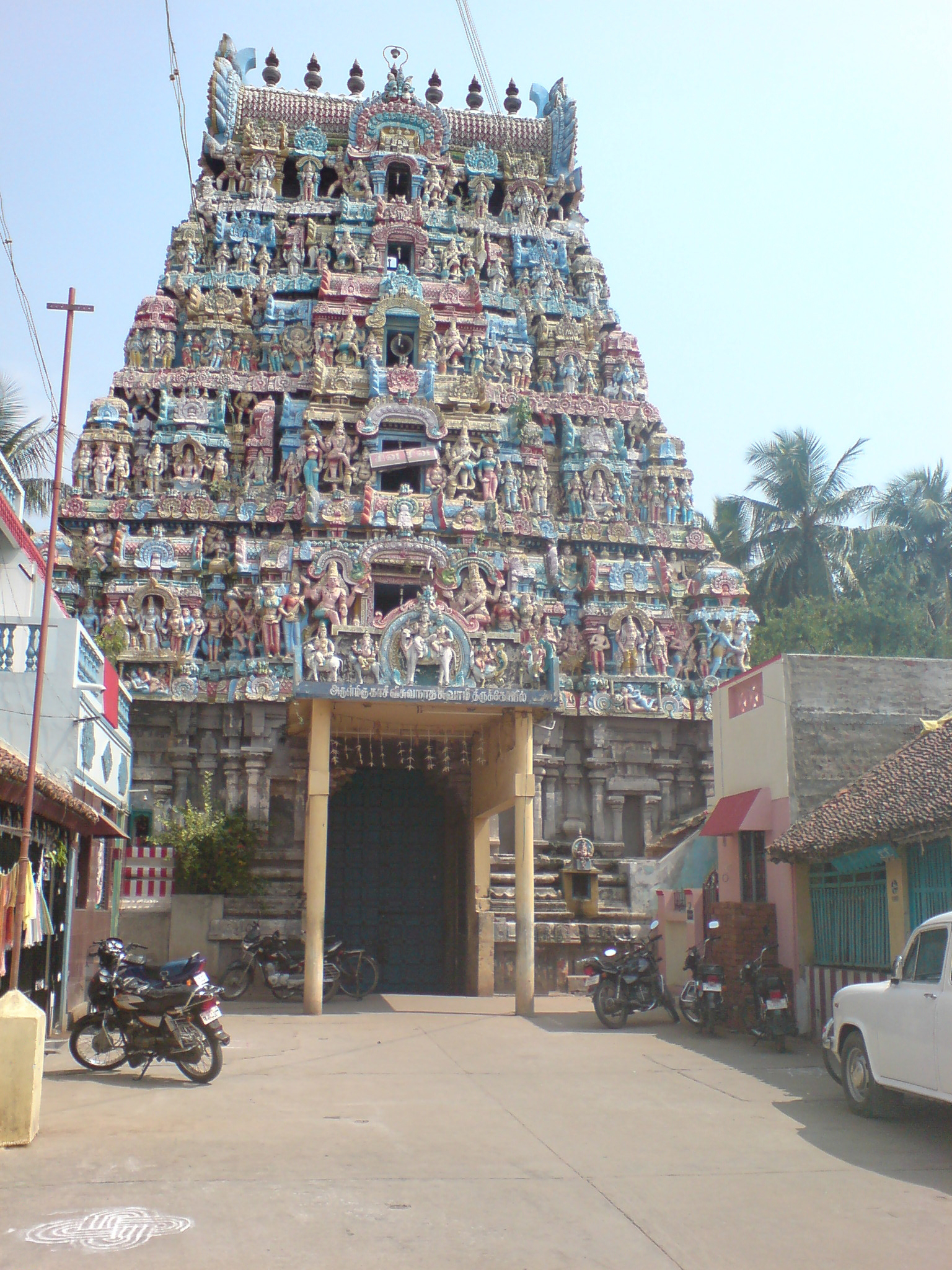
Kasi viswanathar temple, kumbakonam

Kashi Vishwanathar Temple is situated very close to the Mahamaham tank and another temple is placed in Solaiyappan street. Here main deity is Kashi Vishwanathar/Vishalakshi.

=== Adi Kumbeswara Temple ===
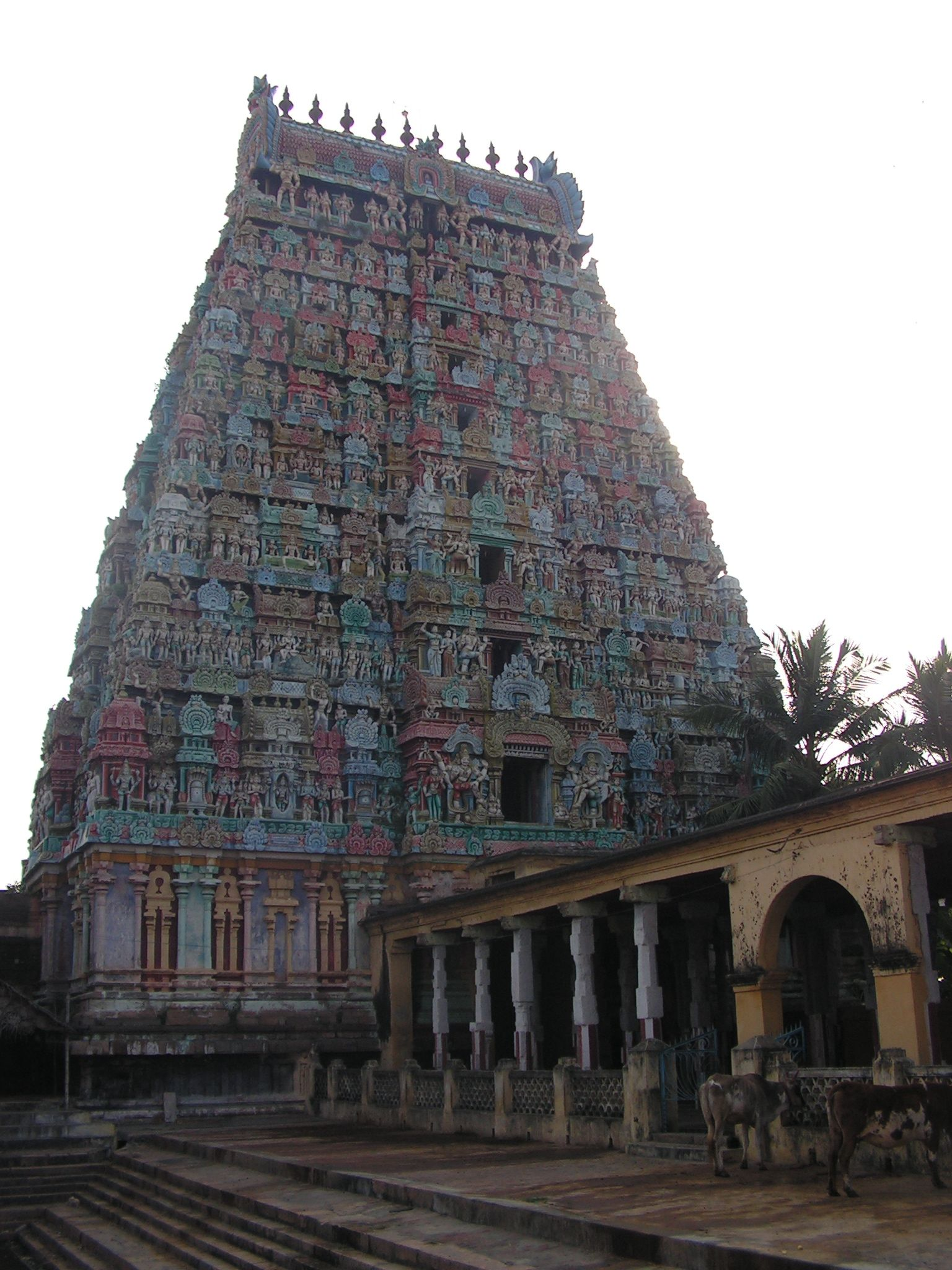
Adi Kumbeswarar Temple, Kumbakonam

Adi Kumbheshwarar temple is the major one among the Shaivite temples and located in the centre of Kumbhakonam at Big Bazaar Street. Shri Adi Kumbheshwara is the presiding deity of Kumbhakonam and Mantrapeetheshwari Mangalambika is the lord's Consort. The temple covers an area of 30,181 sq ft (2,803.9 m^{2}). with a length and breadth of 750 feet (230 m), and 252 feet (77 m) respectively. This temple comprises three Praharas and three Gopurams in the eastern, northern and western directions. The East Gopuram consists of 9 stories with a height of 128 ft (39 m). Mangala Teertham, Marriage hall and small temples for Muruga, Ganapati and Mangalambika are other major constituents of this temple.

=== Someswar Temple ===
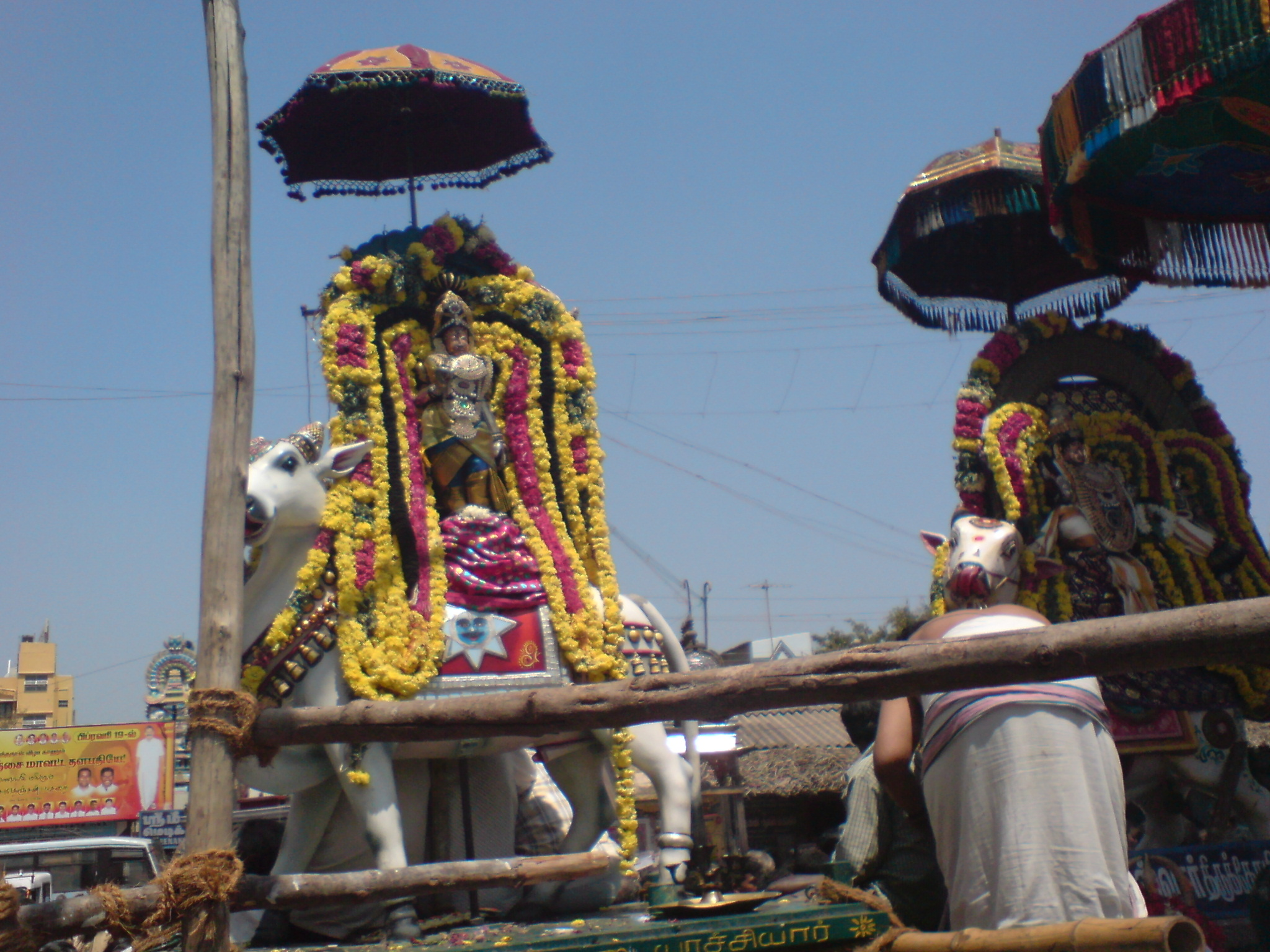
Someswar Temple, kumbakonam

Someswar Temple is situated in the southern portion of Sri Sarangapani temple. This temple faces east with a 5-tier Gopuram at the entrance. It also has an entrance in the south. The architectural style and element of this temple resembles the Dravidian Architecture of the 13th century of the Chola period. Arumugam and Thenar Mozhi Ammal are the other deities located in this temple complex.

=== Nageswaran Temple ===
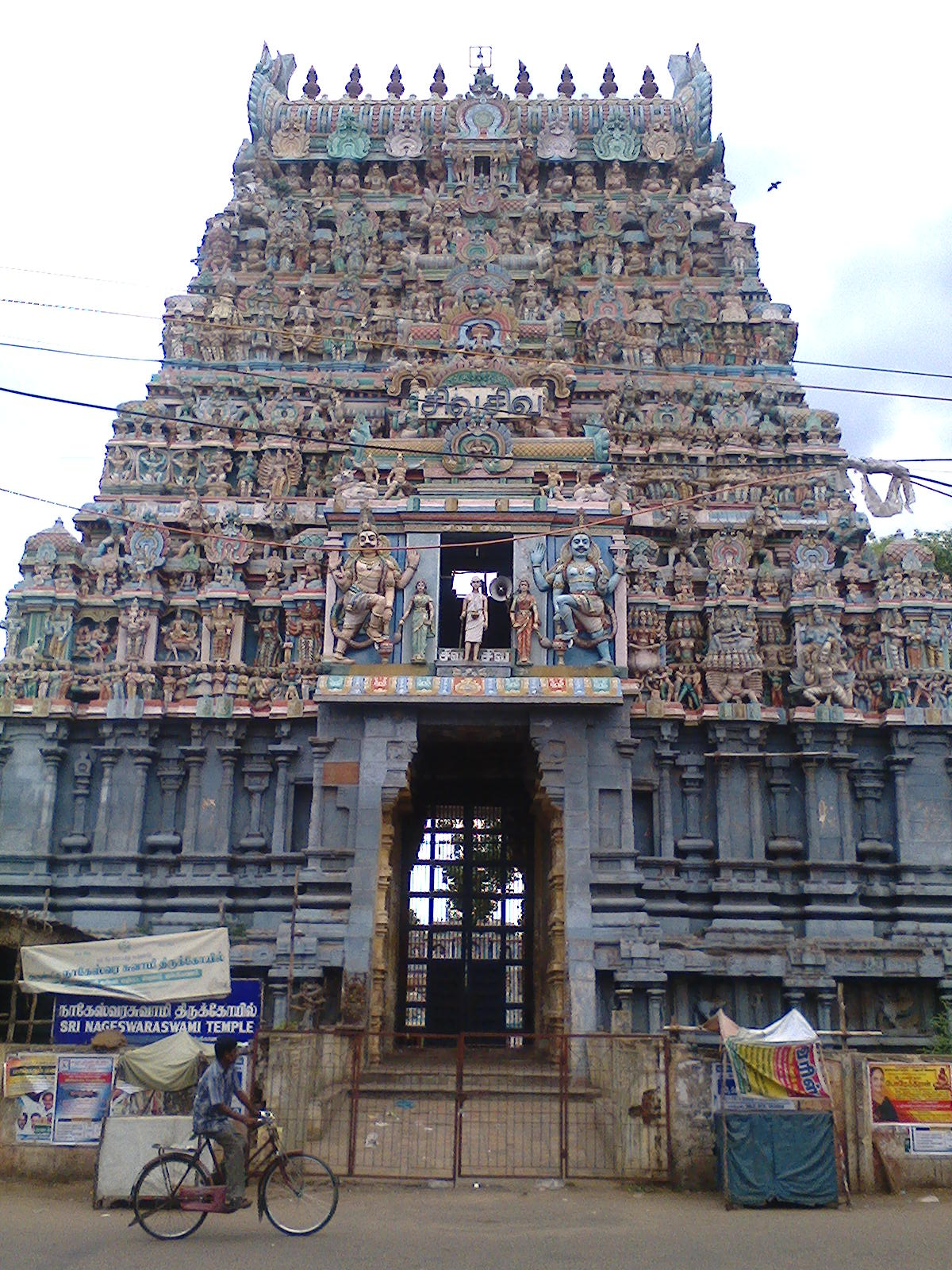
Nageswaraswamy Temple, Kumbakonam

Nageswaran Temple, is dedicated to Shiva in the guise of Nagaraja, the serpent king. Also known as "Koothandavar Kovil", it is located near the Kumbakonam old bus stand. Aditya Chola constructed this temple during the 12th century. It stands as a great marvel of Chola architecture, building technology and astronomy. The design and orientation are structured in such a way that it allows sunlight inside the temple only during the Tamil month of Chithirai (April/May), therefore, it bears another name called Surya Kottam or Keel Kottam. The Karuvarai (Sanctum Sanctorum) of Nageswaran temple is similar to that of Sarangapani Temple, as it is made in the form of a Chariot. The temple consists of three gopurams in the eastern western and southern directions.

This vast temple known is for its shrine to Rahu, one of the nine celestial bodies in the Navagraha. A legend has it that the mythological serpents Adiseshan, Dakshan and Kaarkotakan worshipped Shiva here. Legend also has it that King Nala worshipped Shiva here as in Thirunallar.

=== Ekambeswarar Temple ===
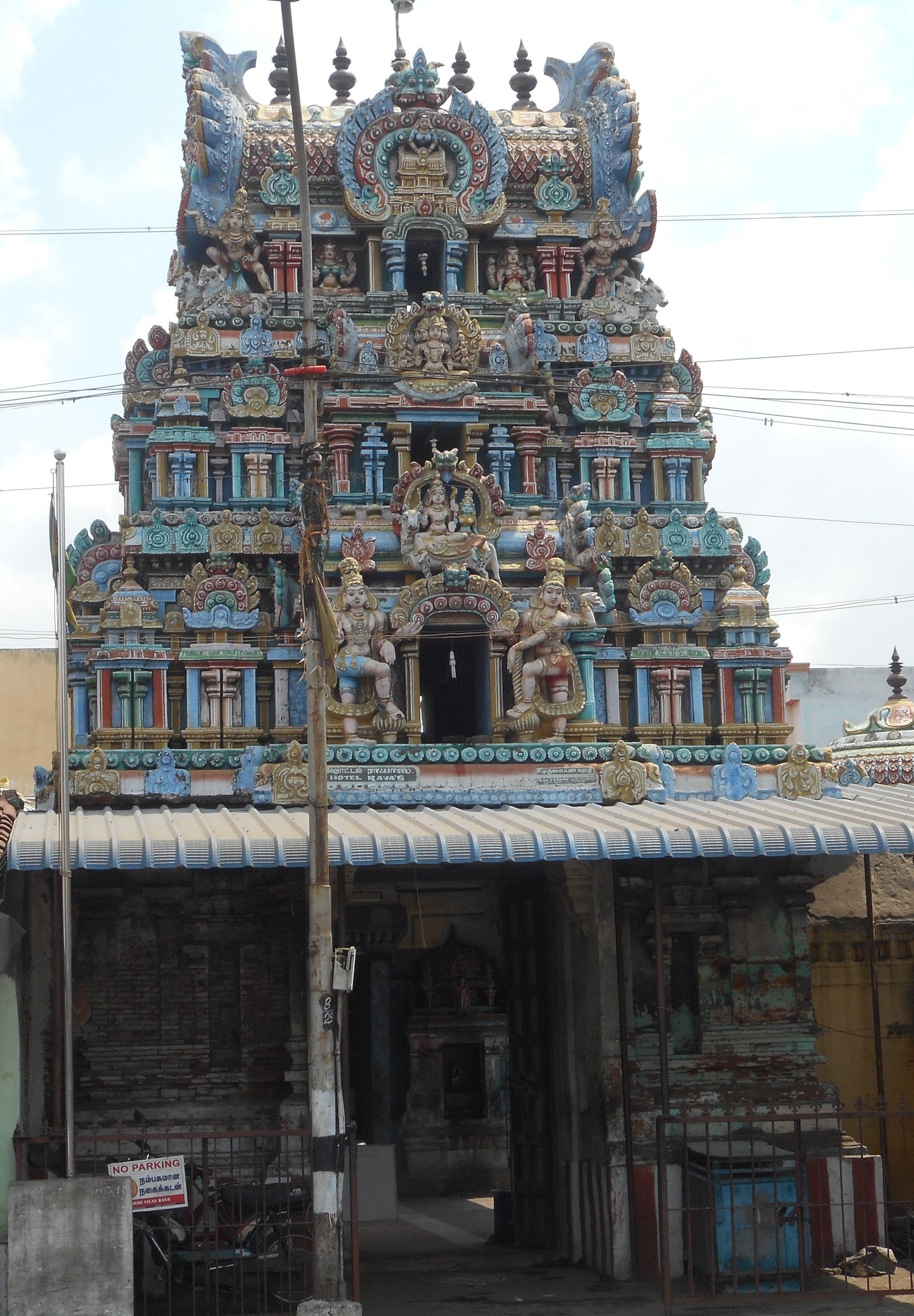
Ekambeswarar Temple, Kumbakonam

Ekambeshwarar Temple is a Hindu temple located at Kumbhakonam. It is dedicated to the Hindu god Shiva. The presiding deity is known as Ekambeshwarar also known by other names Ekamranathaswamy or simply Ekamresha. It is one of the famous Pancha-linga kshetra ( pilgrimages consisting of five Shaivite places )

=== Abimukeswarar Temple ===
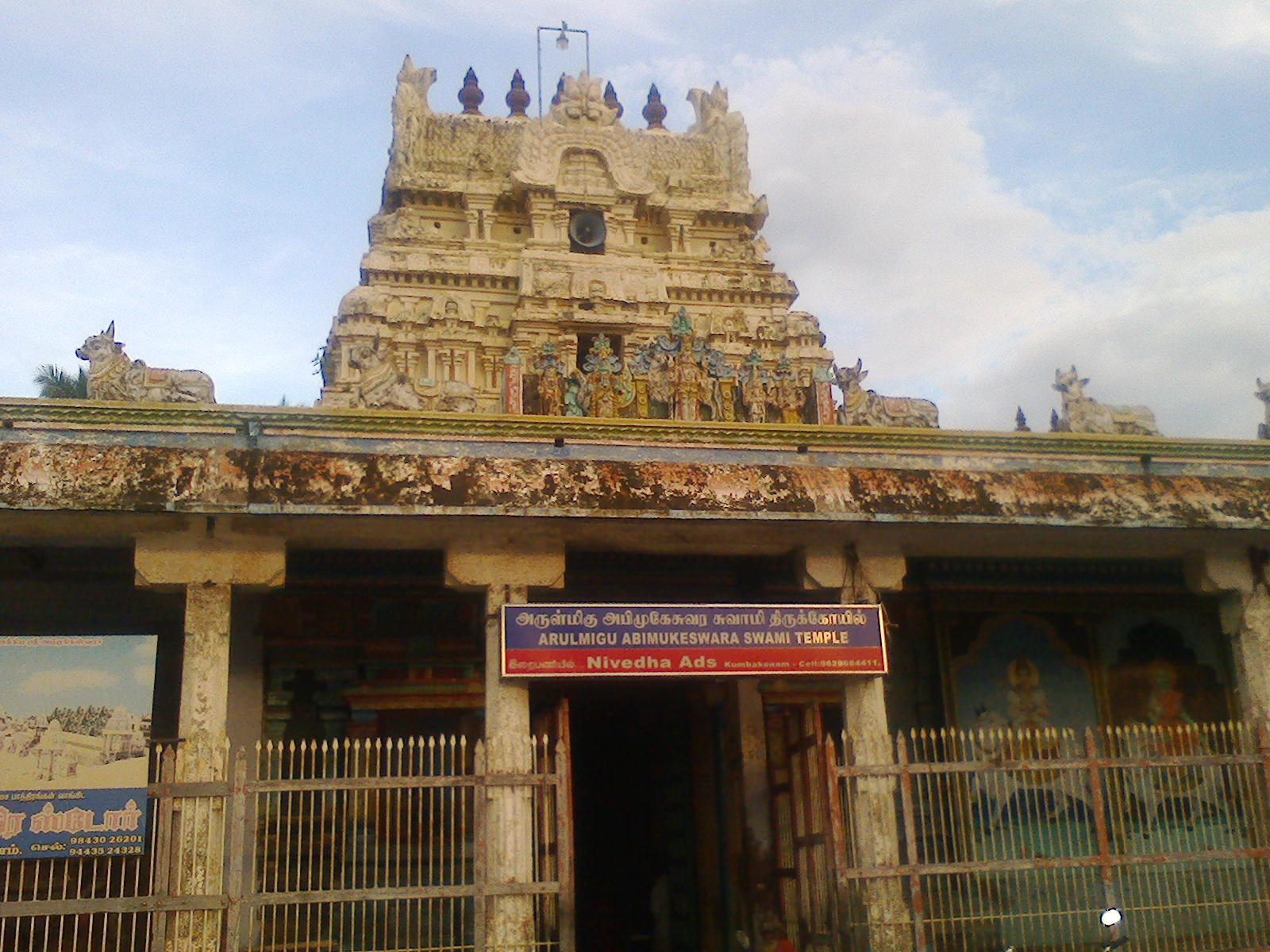
Abimukeswarar Temple, Kumbakonam

Abhimukheshwarar Temple is situated in the eastern bank of the Mahamaham tank, Kumbhakonam. It is a Shiva temple. The presiding deity of the temple, in the form of Shivalinga, is known as Abhimukheshwarar. His consort is known as Amirthavalli or Amritavalli.

=== Gauthameswarar Temple ===
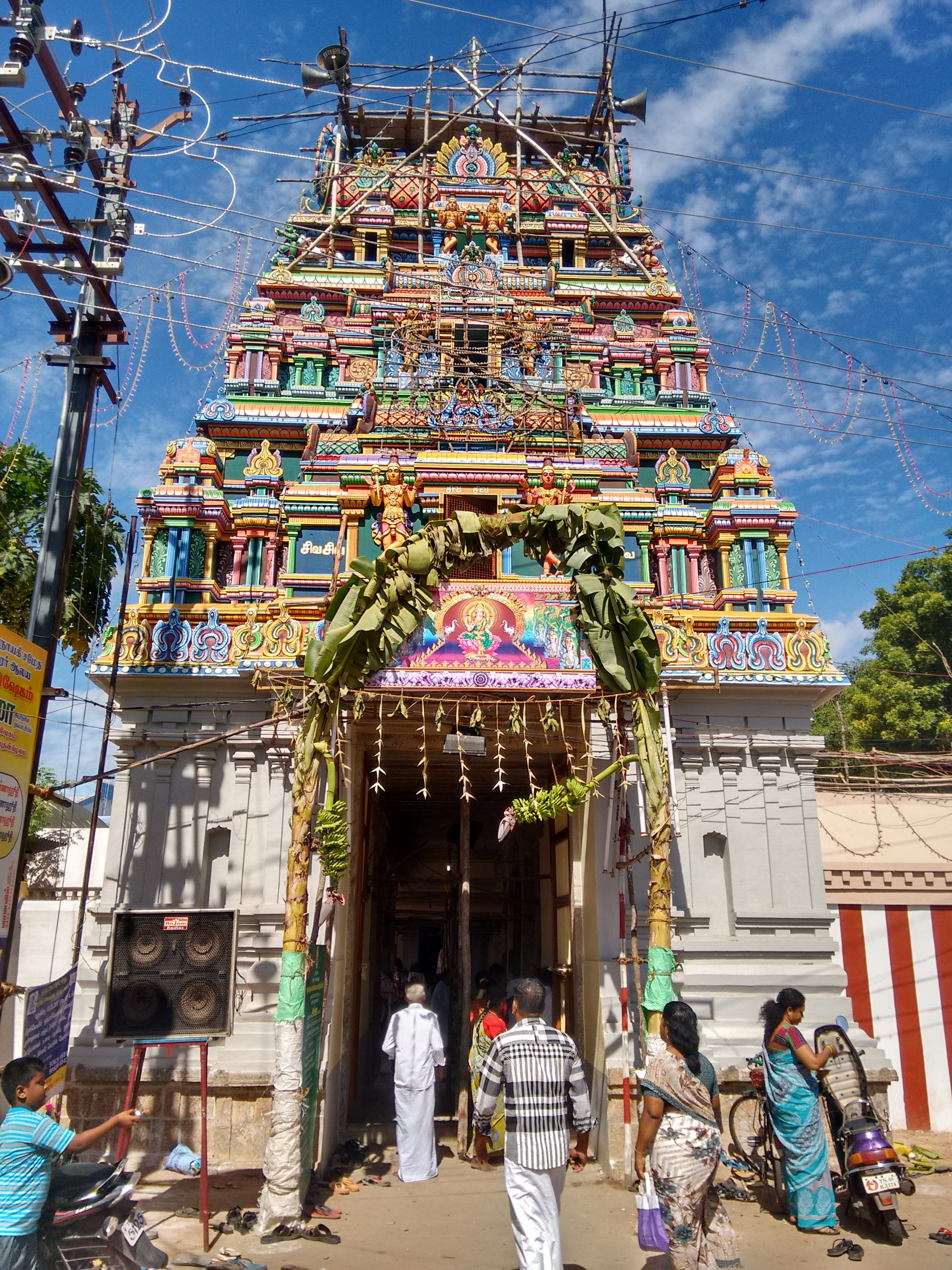
Gauthameswarar Temple, Kumbakonam

Gautameshwarar Temple is situated in the western bank of the Mahamaham tank, Kumbhakonam It is a Shiva temple. The presiding deity of the temple, in the form of Shivalinga, is known as Gautameshwarar. His consort is known as Saundaryanayaki.

=== Kambatta Viswanathar Temple ===
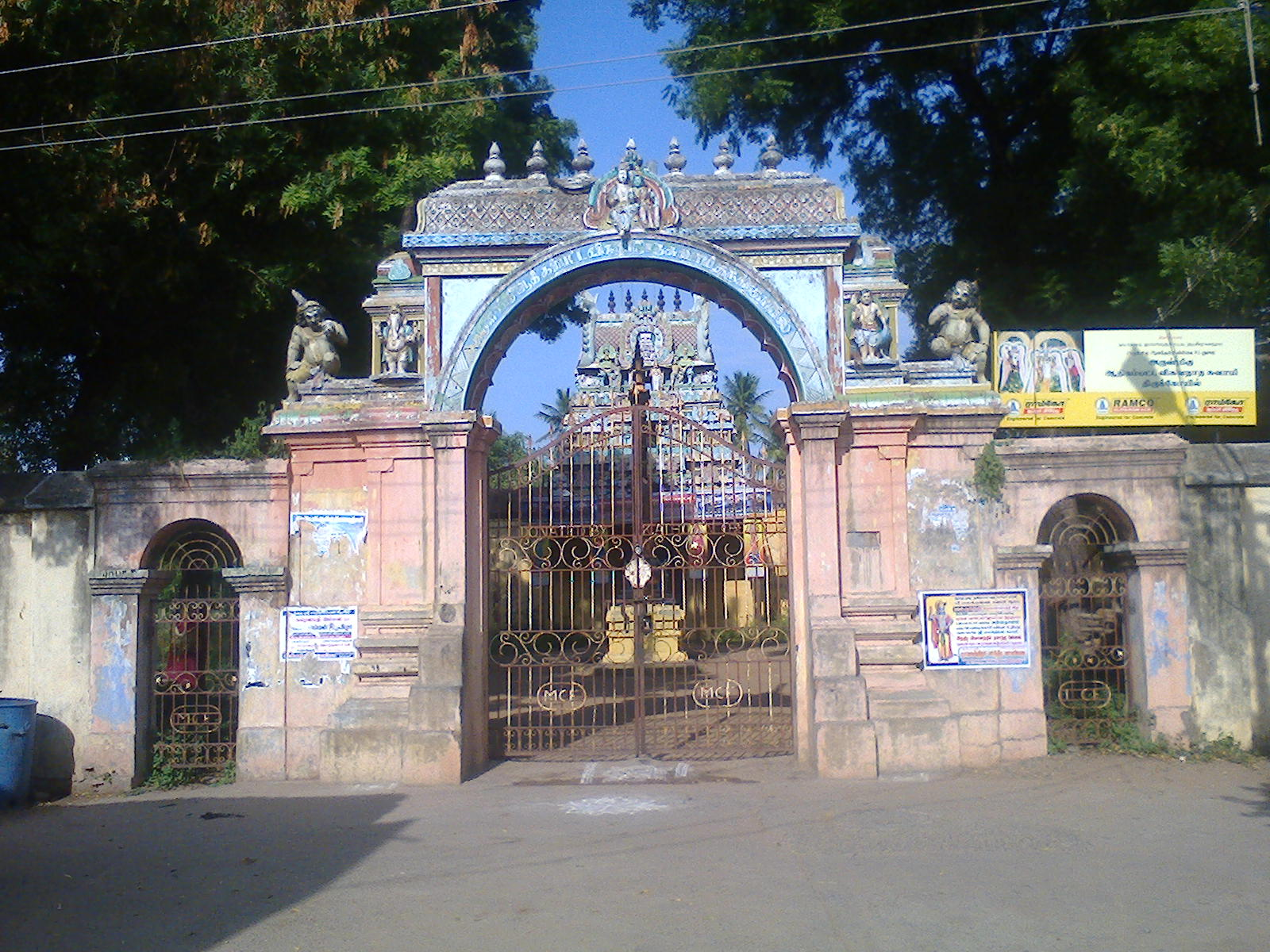
Kambatta Viswanathar Temple, Kumbakonam

Kambatta Viswanathar Temple is a Hindu temple located at Kumbakonam at the south west of Kumbeswarar Temple. It is dedicated to the Hindu god Shiva. The presiding deity is known as Kambatta Viswanathar.

=== Banapuriswarar Temple ===
Banapuriswarar Temple is a Hindu temple located in the town of Kumbakonam. It is dedicated to the Hindu god Shiva. The presiding deity is known as Banupuriswarar.

=== Kalahasteeswarar Temple ===
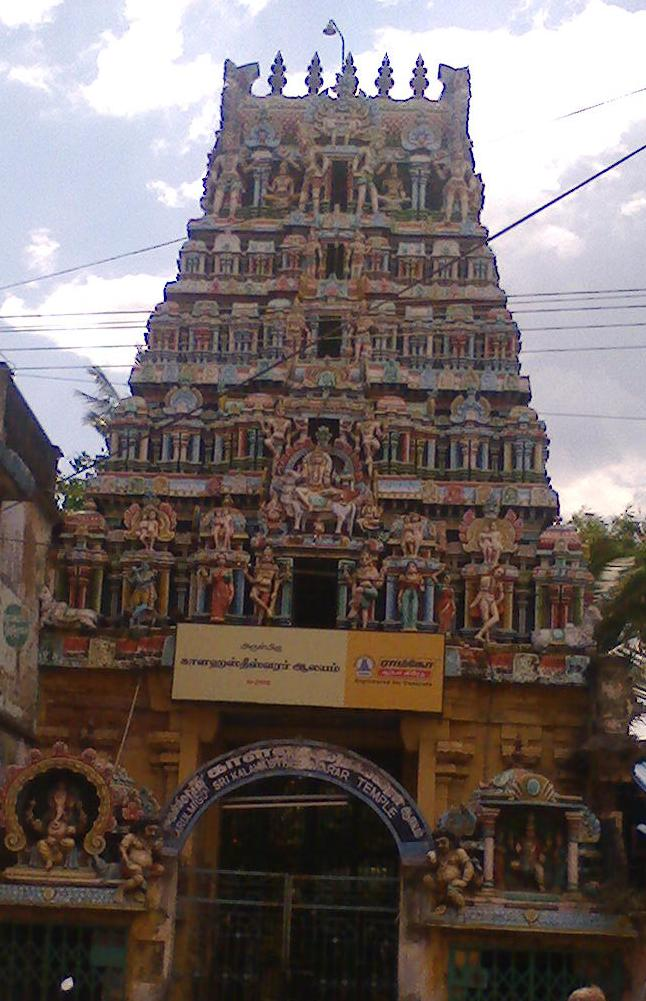
Kalahasteeswarar Temple, Kumbakonam

Kalahasteeshwarar Temple is a Shiva temple located at Kumbhakonam. The presiding deity is known as Kalahasteeshwaraswamy . His consort is known as Gnanambikai. The temple was renovated during the period of Serfoji or Sharabhoji ( śarabhōji ) .

=== Kottaiyur Kodeeswarar temple ===
Kottaiyur Kodeeswarar ( ot koteeshwarar ) Temple (ta:கொட்டையூர் கோடீஸ்வரர் கோயில்) is a Hindu temple dedicated to Shiva, located in Kottaiyur, a village in the outskirts of Kumbakonam, in Thanjavur district in Tamil Nadu, India. Shiva is worshipped as Koteeswarar and his consort Parvathi as Pandhadu Nayaki. Koteeswarar is revered in the 7th century Tamil Shaiva canonical work, the Tevaram, written by Tamil saint poets known as the Nayanmars and classified as Paadal Petra Sthalam, the 275 temples revered in the canon.

=== Amirthakadeswarar Temple, Sakkottai ===
Amirthakadeswarar Temple (ta:சாக்கோட்டை அமிர்தகலேசுவரர் கோயில்) dedicated to the deity Shiva, located at Sakkottai. As per Hindu legend, the essence of creation arrived at this place in a pot (locally called kalayam), the place came to be known as Kalayanallur. Shiva is worshiped here as Amirthakadeswarar. His consort Parvati is depicted as Amirthavalli Amman. The presiding deity is revered in the 7th century Tamil Saiva canonical work, the Tevaram, written by Tamil saint poets known as the Nayanmars and classified as Paadal Petra Sthalam.

== Vaishnavite Temples in Kumbakonam ==
=== Sarangapani Temple ===
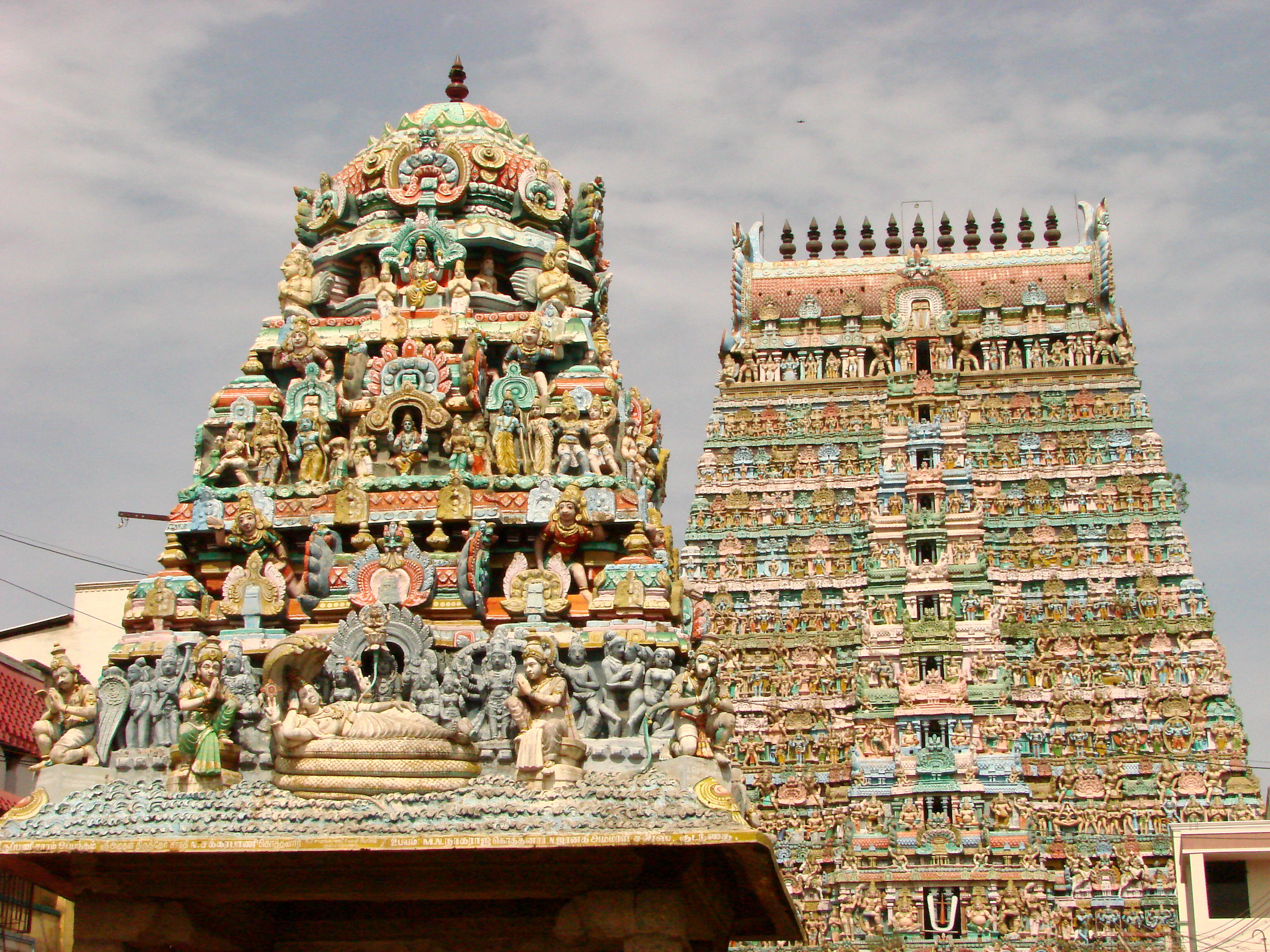
Sarangapani Temple

Of the many temples in Kumbakonam, the most striking is the Sarangapani Temple, a Vaishnavite temple. This famous pancharanga kshetram is in the midst of the busy market place. Before the Sri Rangam Temple gopuram (tower) was built, this temple used to hold the place for the tallest Temple Tower in South Asia. This twelve storied 147 feet (45 m) high temple was built by the Nayak Kings during the 15th century.

=== Chakrapani Temple ===
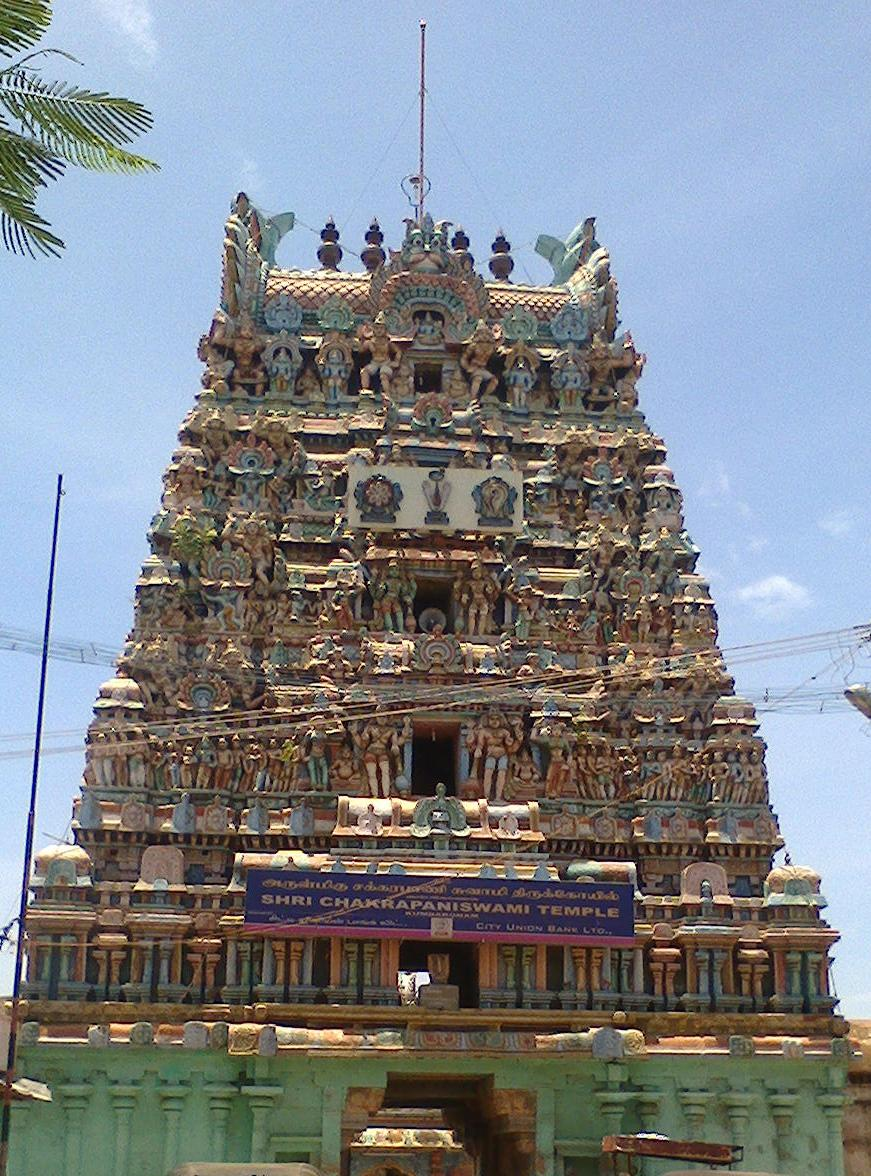
Chakrapani Temple, Kumbakonam

Chakrapani Temple is situated about 1.5 km North of Ramaswamy Temple. Here the main deity is Chakraraja. The Sudarshana Chakra is also here. The temple is also an exquisite exponent of the early temple architecture. The important and peculiar point about this temple is that Vilva (Bilwa) archana which is normally performed in Shiva temples is also performed here for the Perumal (Vishnu).

=== Ramaswamy Temple ===
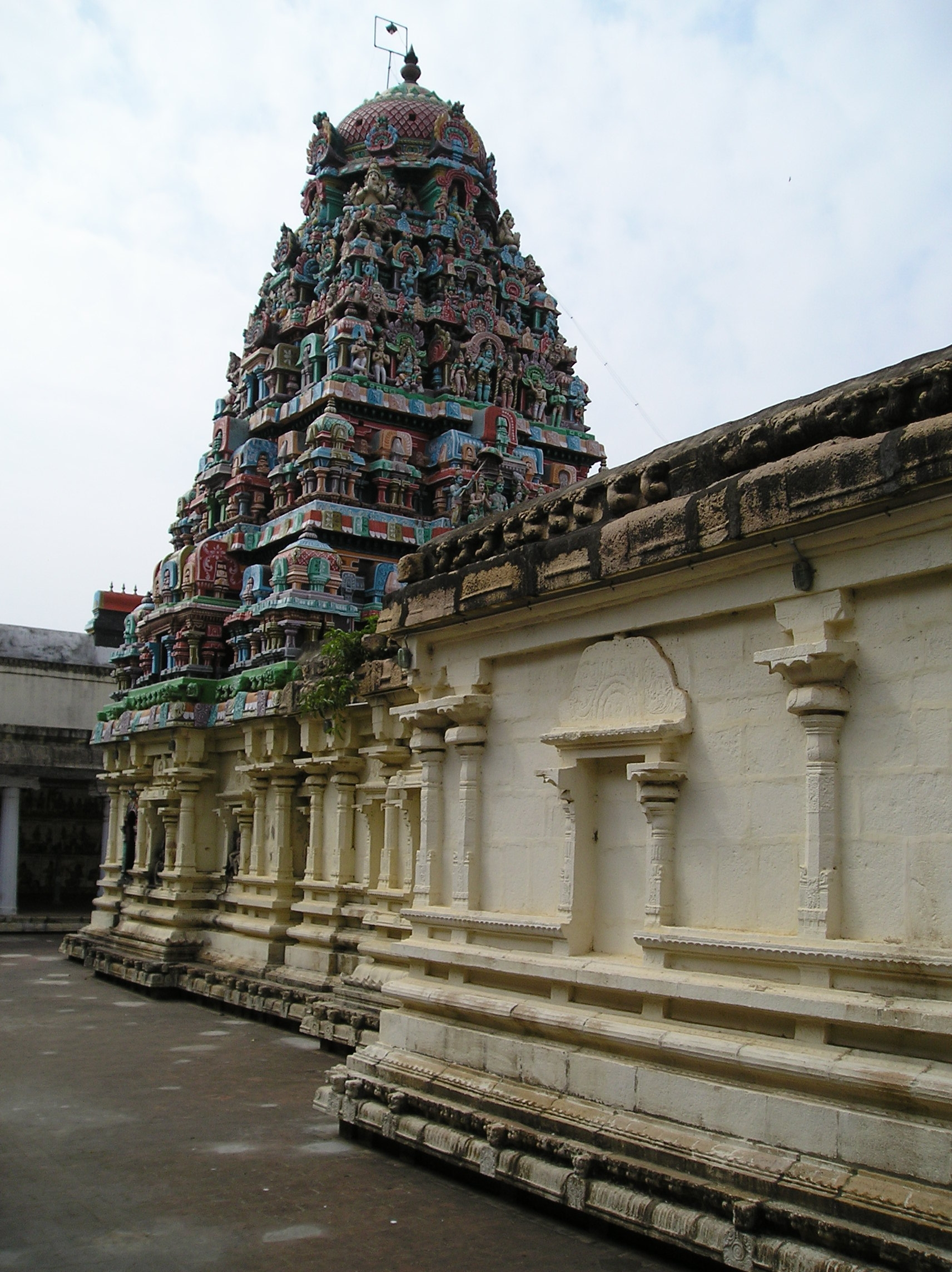
Ramaswamy Temple

The Ramaswamy Temple which depicts the paintings of Ramayana is another important Vaishanavite temple in Kumbakonam. The greatness of Ramaswamy Temple is said to be the only temple where Rama, Sita are in the same platform and Hanuman is playing the veena instead of reading the Ramayana. The entire deity is said to be made from Saligrama monolith. The Temple is filled with intricate carvings in its pillars.This temple is known as " Thennaga Ayodheyai " which means Ayodhys of south.

=== Rajagopalaswamy Temple ===
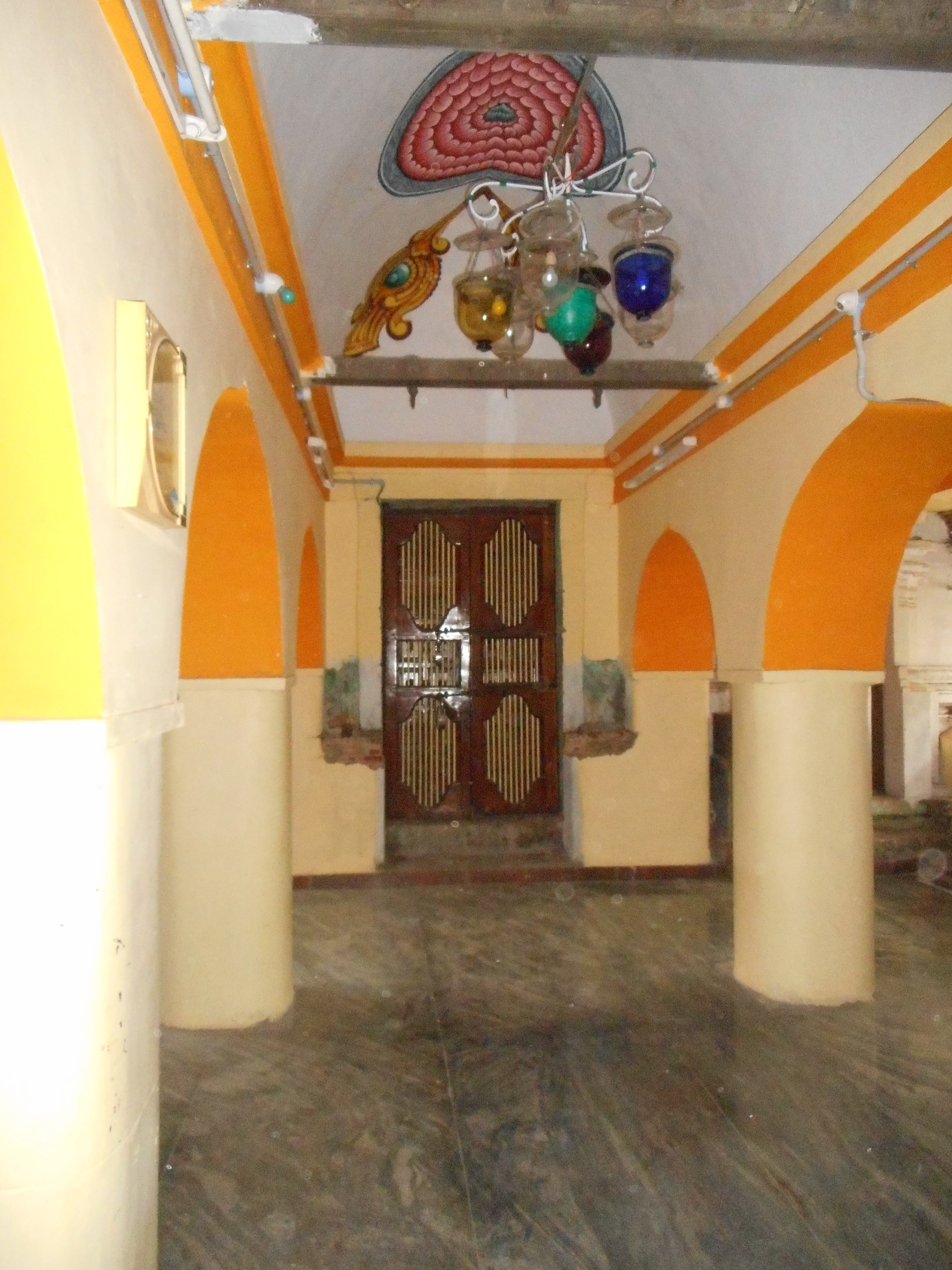
Rajagopalaswamy Temple, Kumbakonam

The Rajagopalaswamy temple is situated at Big Street in Kumbakonam. The presiding deity is known as Rajagopalaswamy. His consort is known as Sengamalavalli.

=== Varahaperumal Temple ===
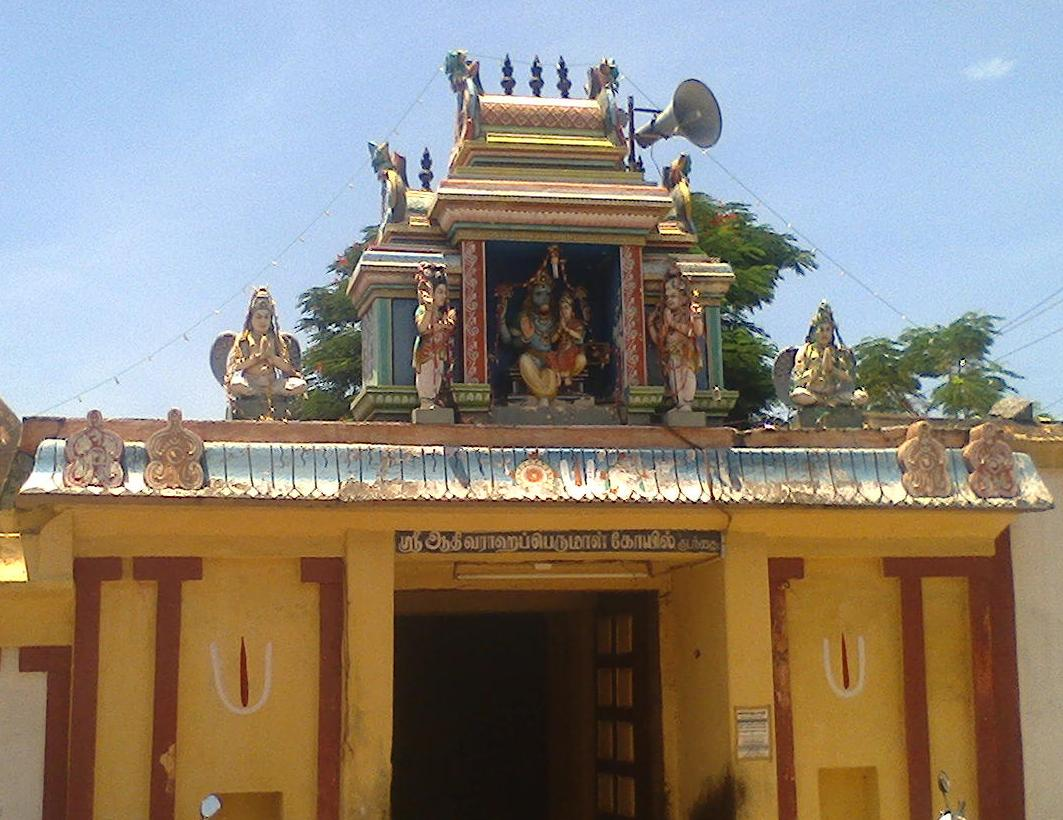
Varahaperumal Temple, Kumbakonam

The Varahaperumal Temple is situated at Kumbakonam. The presiding deity is known as Varahaperumal. His consort is known as Boomidevi.

== Specialty ==
Twelve Shiva temples are connected with Mahamaham festival which happens once in 12 years in Kumbakonam. They are:

- Kasi Viswanathar Temple,
- Kumbeswarar Temple,
- Someswarar Temple,
- Nageswara Temple,
- Kaalahasteeswarar Temple,
- Gowthameswarar Temple,
- Koteeswarar Temple,
- Banapuriswarar Temple,
- Abimukeswarar Temple,
- Kambatta Visvanathar Temple,
- Ekambareswarar Temple and
- Amirthakalasanathar Temple

Five Vishnu temples are connected with Mahamaham festival which happens once in 12 years in Kumbakonam. They are:

- Sarangapani Temple,
- Chakrapani Temple,
- Ramaswamy Temple,
- Rajagopalaswamy Temple, and
- Varahaperumal Temple.

== Other temples in Kumbakonam ==
=== Sri Vijayeendra Tirtha Moola Brindavanam ===
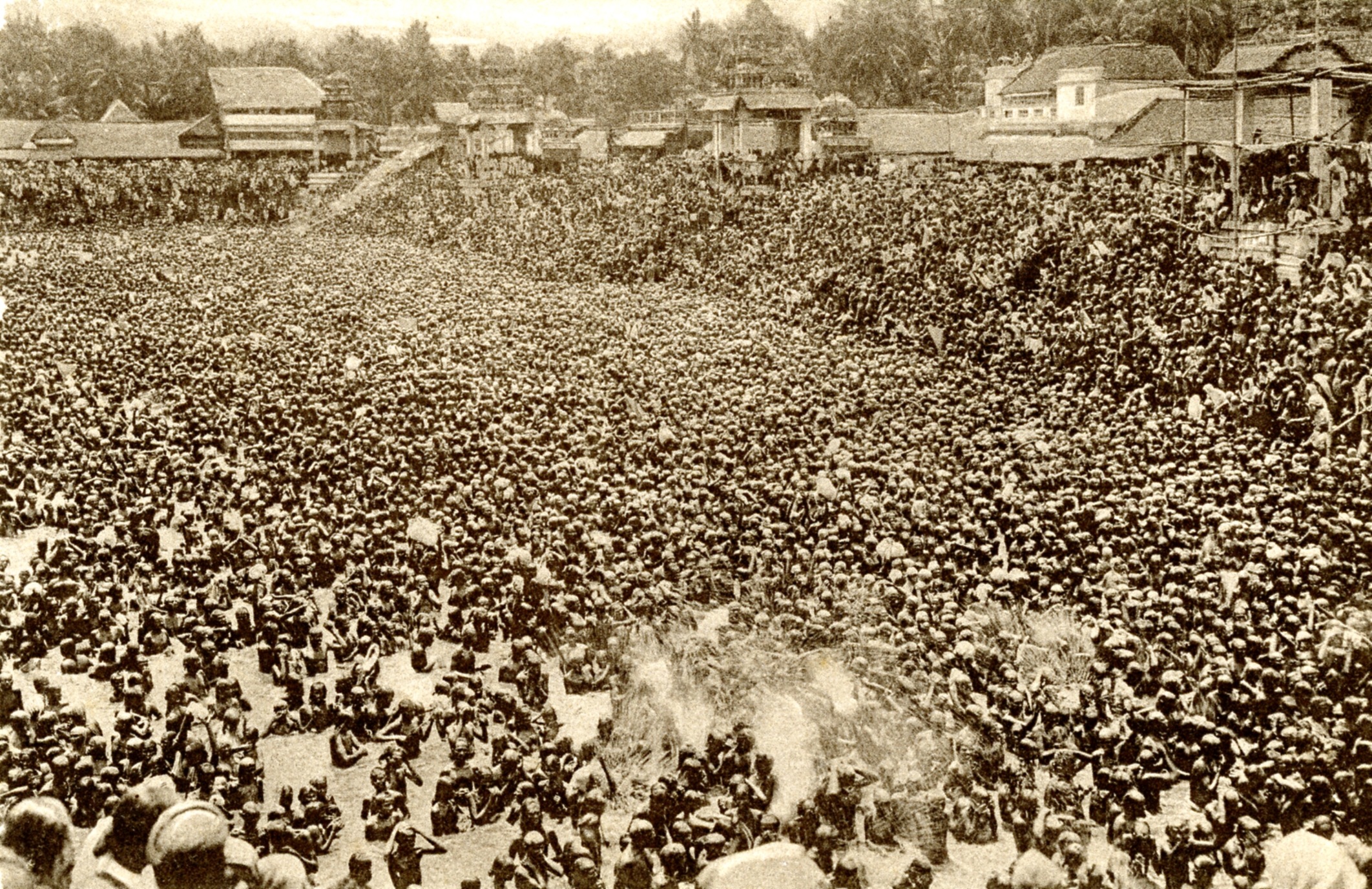
Thousands of people take the holy dip at the Mahamaham Festival.

We can find the moola brindavanam of Sri Vijayeendra Tirtha (Raghavendra Swamy guru's guru) here. It is in Solaiyappan Street. The great Vijayeendra Tirtha's Aradhana falls on Jyeshta Trayodashi. He was one of the greatest scholar what India has produced. He was a staunch Vishnu bhakta and a great philosopher. He was an exponent of 64 vidyas.

=== Sri SitaRama Bhavani Sankarar Temple ===
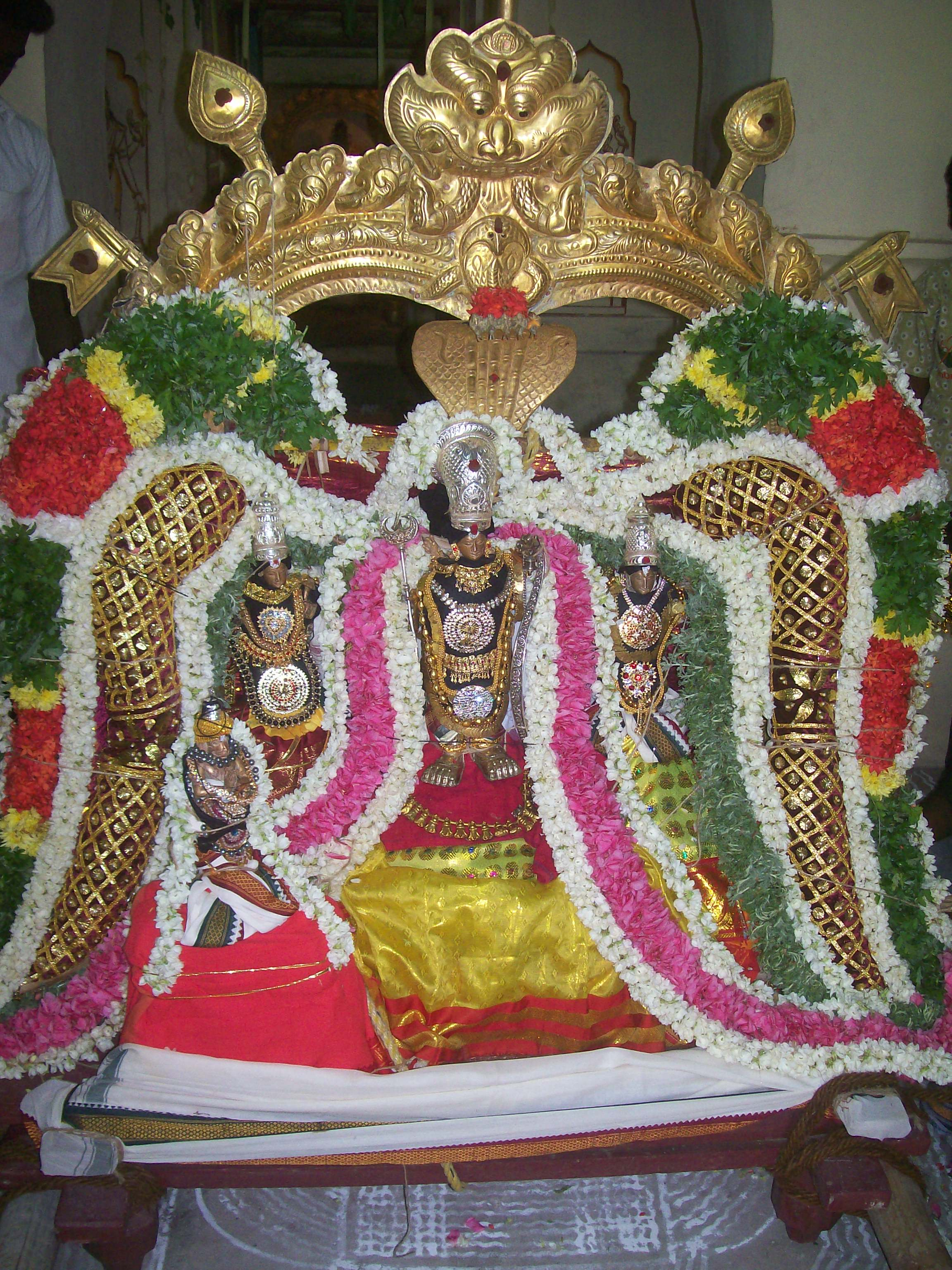
Solaiappan st Sri Ramaswamy

This temple is situated at Solaiyappan street on the banks of the Cauvery river (Nangam Thirunal Padithurai). This private temple is supposed to be more than 200 years old built by Achalpuram Shri.Lakshmana shrowthigal's (great scholar of Krishna Yajur Veda)son Indore Shri.Subba Rao Lakshmana Dravid. In this temple deities are Sri Rama, Shiva (Sankara) in the form of Bhana lingam and Parvathi (Bhavani) are in separate sannithis. Rama, Lakshmana, Sita, and Hanuman are made of white marbles. This ramar (called Solaiappan Agraharam Ramaswamy) is one of the twelve deities in the Akshya trithi celebrations in Kumbakonam. This temple was managed by Late. Smt. Rajalakshmi(Ramarkoil Rajalakshmi Ammal, daughter of late Shri.Subba Rao (II) Son of Shri.Ramachandra Rao Dravid) till 2013. The temple is currently managed by all the children and grandchildren of Late Shri. Subba Rao (II) Dravid alias Subramanya Iyer & Late Saraswathi Ammal family. Several Hindu religious saints use to come here to do chaturmasya. Paramahamsa Siva Prakasa Anandagiri Swamigal stayed in this temple did his tapas and puja for quite a number of times and got information at the entrance of the temple to travel to Thiruviyaru to attain mukthi. Similarly, he did and attained mukthi at Thiruviyaru. Hanuman in this temple has a knife, gatha, bow & arrow at the back and japamala in his hand doing Ramajapam. Rama with jadamudi and knife(valkaram)at hip and marauri (dress) and kothdhandam in his hand.

=== Sri Rama Bhajanai Sabha ===
Sri Rama Bhajanai Sabha founded and nurtured by Venuganam Sri Sarabha Sastri about 125 years ago. It is in Solaiappan Street. Every year sabha celebrates Sri Rama Navami Utasavam and Sri Radha Kalyana Mahotsavam and committed to its various cultural and religious needs of the Hindu society with the grace of Lord Rama.

== Temples around Kumbakonam ==
=== Thirunageswaram Temple ===
Thirunageswaram is located 8 km east of Kumbakonam. There are two major temples at Thirunageswaram. One the famous Vaishnavaite temple of Oppliyappan (Oppliyappan Sannadhi) (the Venkatesh Perumal of Tirupathi), the other the Thirunageswarar or Naganathaswami temple for Shaivaites. An important rite of this temple is that of Rahu bhagawan sannathi where milk abhishekham is performed daily during Rahukaalam. At this time, milk that is poured on the statue is supposed to turn blue when it passes over the body, and back to white after it reaches the floor. This is watched by many daily during the raahu kaalam. This is also the only place wherein one can view Rahu bhagawan with his consorts.

=== Pateeswaram temple ===
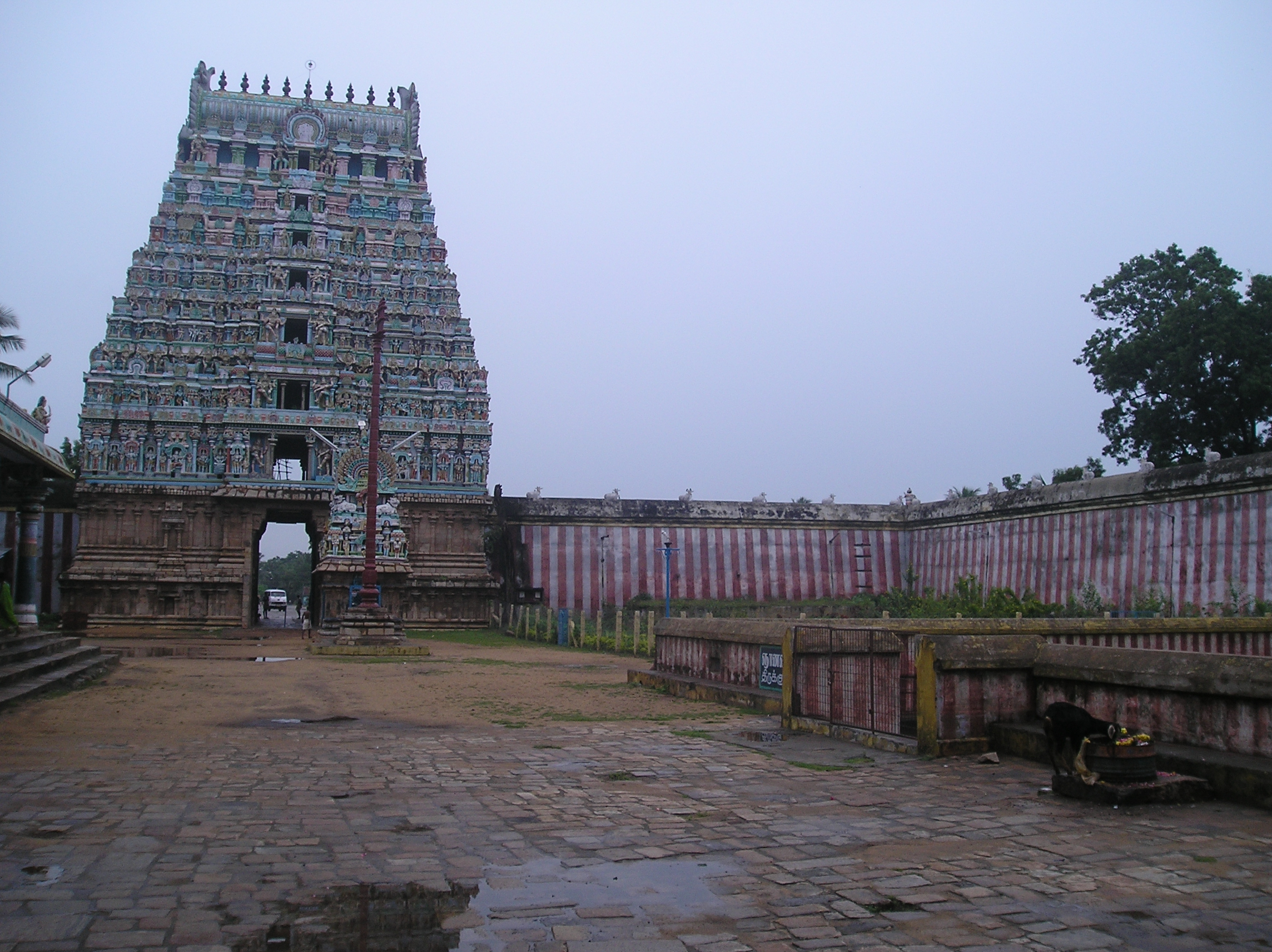
Patteswaram, Kumbakonam

Sri Thenupureeswarar temple at Patteeswaram, 5 km south-east of Kumbakonam, was constructed during the 16th century by Govinda Dikshithar, a Minister of Nayak King Achuthappa.

=== Airavatesvara Temple ===
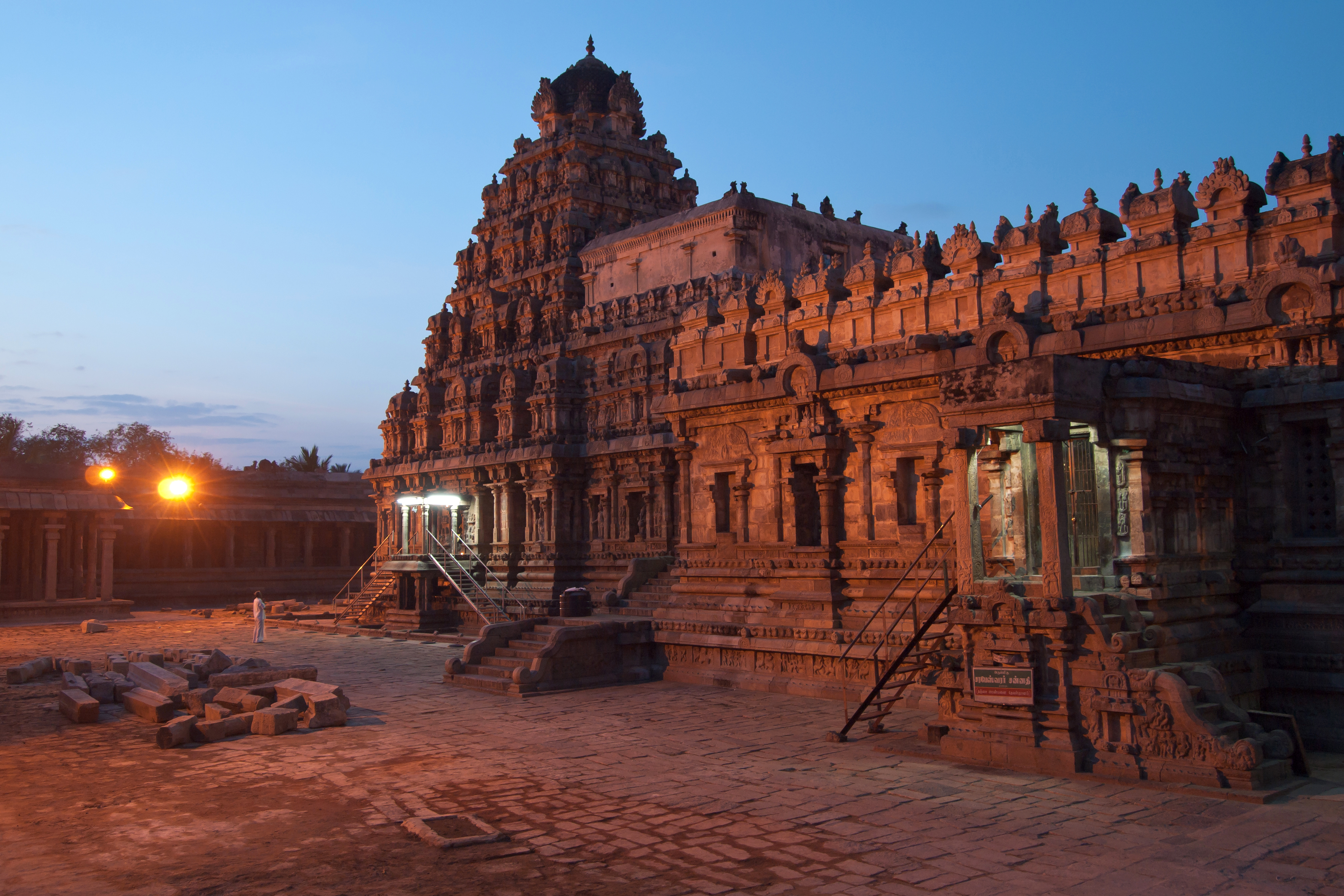
Airavateswarar Temple

The temple at Darasuram, 4 km west of Kumbakonam is Airvatesvara (Airavat is the holy white elephant) Temple, constructed by Rajaraja Chola II (1146–63), is a superb example of 12th-century Chola architecture. Many statues were removed to the art gallery in the Thanjavur Palace, but have since been returned. The remarkable structures depict, among other things, Shiva as Kankala-murti - the mendicant. Stories from epics and Hindu mythology are depicted. Adjoining the Airavatesvara temple is the Deiva Nayaki Ambal temple. In 2004 the Archaeological Survey of India (ASI) excavated and restored the temple.

=== Navagraha Temples ===
The area surrounding Kumbakonam is home to a set of Navagraha temples dating from the Chola period.

=== Swamimalai temple ===
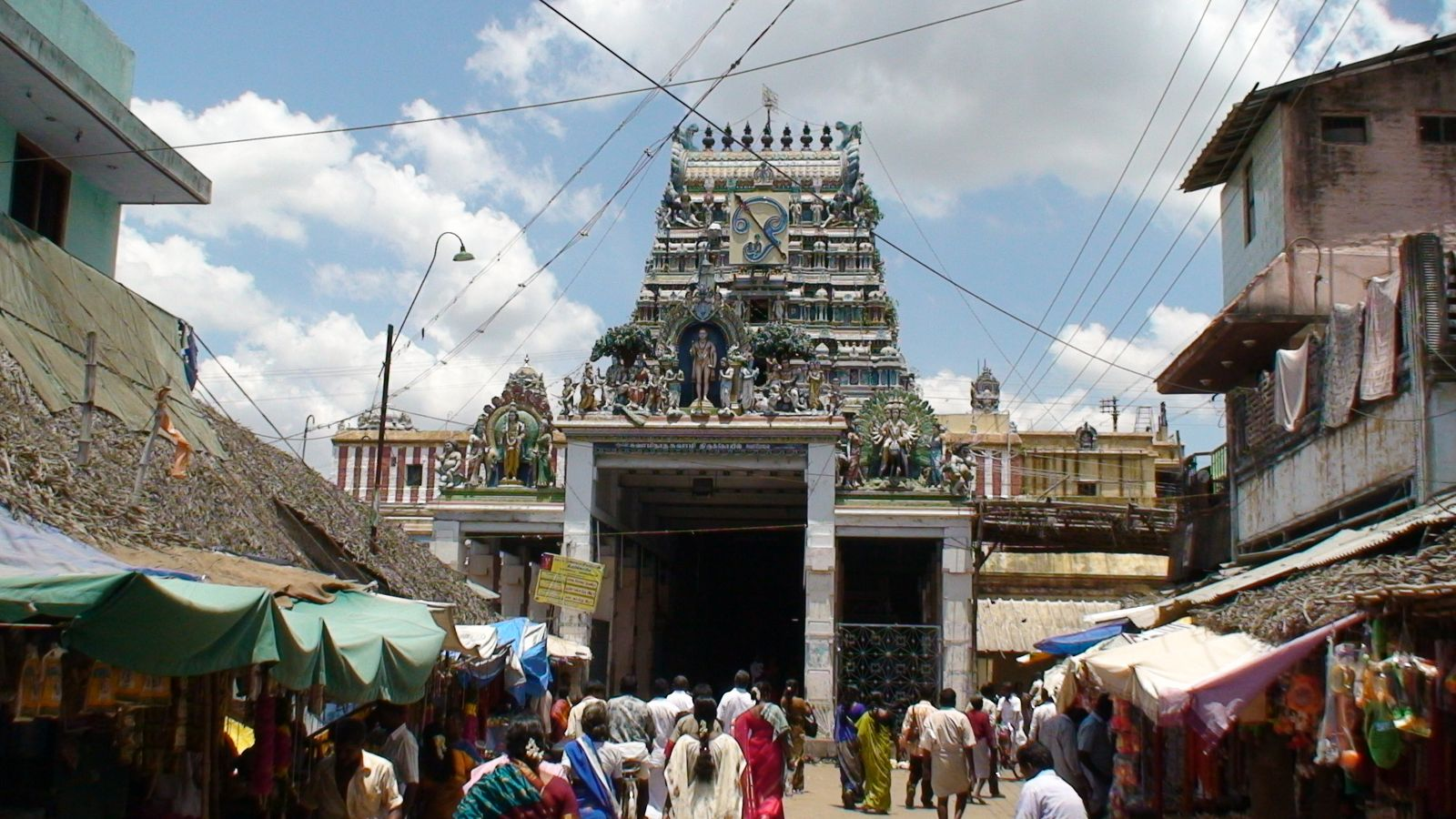
Swamimalai Murugan Temple

The Murugan temple is located in Swami Malai, which is around 10 km from kumbakonam. It is located on the main road connecting Kumbakonam and Thanjavur. It is one among the six famous temples (Arupadai Veedu) of Murugan. This is the place where the Murugan in childhood taught the meaning of mandra "OM" to his father Shiva. Murugan's Fourth home.

=== Thiruvalanjuzhi Vinayakar Temple ===
This siva temple is famous for vinayakar sculpture which has been carved from white foam while churning the milky sea. So the name of the god in Tamil is "Vellai pillayar" meaning that "White vinayakar". This temple is located in small village "Thiruvalansuzi" which is 4 km from Kumbakonam and 2 km from Swamimalai.

=== Tribhuvanan or Thirubhuvanam Sarabeswarar Temple ===
Sri Kampa-hareshwarar is the main deity, Sharabheshwarer, a form of Shiva is the presiding deity of the temple.

=== Thirucherai Temples ===
Thirucherai is a village which is 15 km from Kumbakonam. Sri Saranatha Perumal Temple and Sara Parameswarar temple are located there.
