= Gauthameswarar Temple =

Shiva temple in Tamil Nadu, India

Coordinates: 10.954854°N 79.379797°E

Gowthameswarar Temple
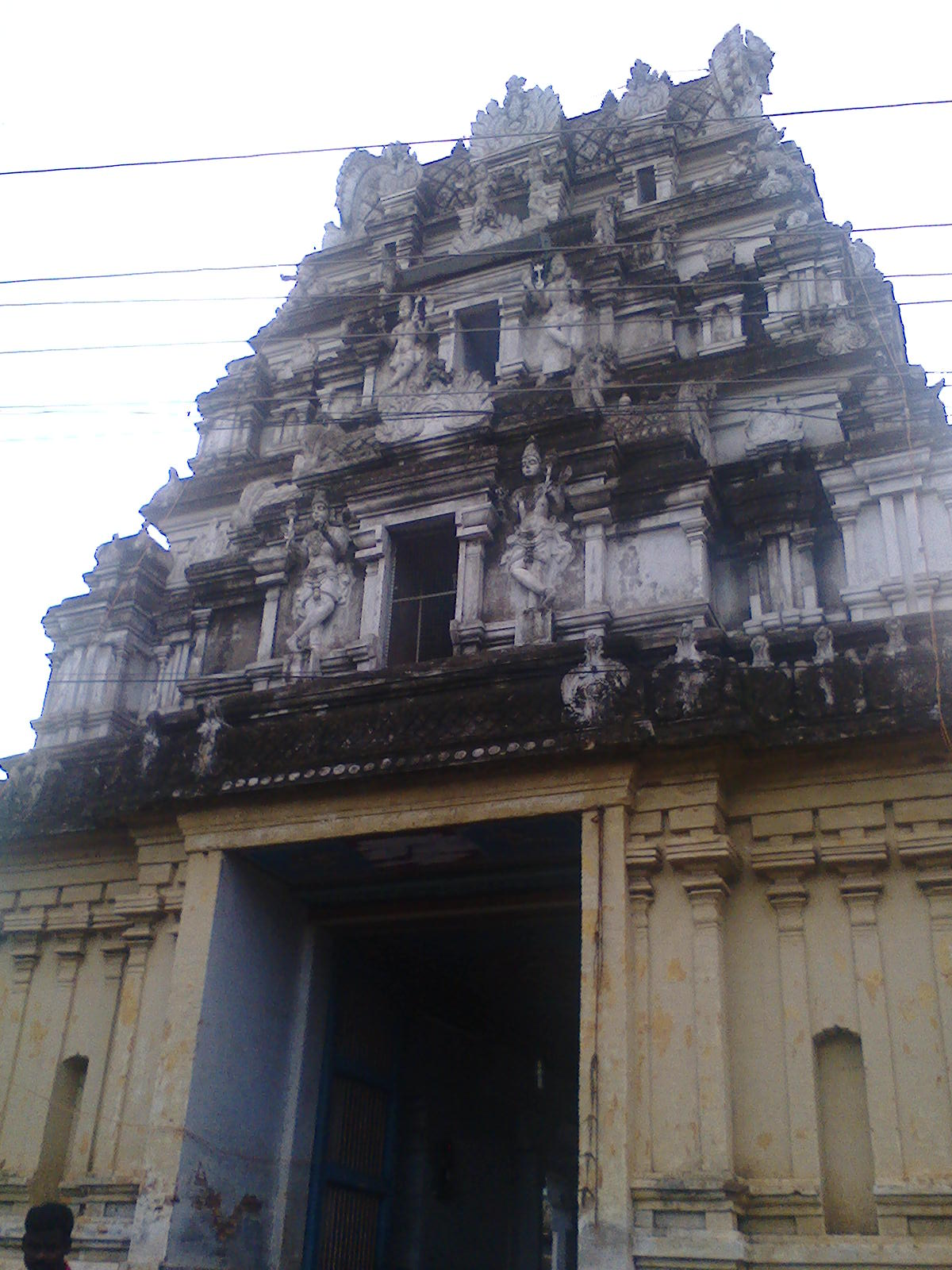
- Gowthameswarar Temple before Kumbabishegam

Religion
- Affiliation: Hinduism
- District: Thanjavur
- Deity: Gowthameswarar (Shiva); Soundara Nayaki (goddess)

Location
- Location: Kumbakonam
- State: Tamil Nadu
- Country: India
- Interactive map of Gowthameswarar Temple

Gauthameswarar Temple is a Hindu temple dedicated to Shiva located at Kumbakonam in Thanjavur district, Tamil Nadu, India.

== Location ==
This temple is located to the eastern bank of the Mahamaham tank, Kumbakonam.

== Presiding deity ==
The moolavar presiding deity, is found in his manifestation as Gauthameswarar. His consort, Parvati, is known as Soundara Nayaki. The thread around the kumba fell in this place and the linga was formed. It is said that Gowthama muni to get rid of the sin due to killing of a cow worshipped the deity of the temple.

== Specialty ==
12 Shiva temples are connected with Mahamaham festival which happens once in 12 years in Kumbakonam. They are:

- Kasi Visanathar Temple,
- Adi Kumbeswarar Temple,
- Someswarar Temple,
- Nageswaraswamy Temple,
- Kalahasteeswarar Temple,
- Gowthameswarar Temple,
- Kodeeswarar Temple,
- Amirthakadeswarar Temple,
- Banapuriswarar Temple,
- Abimukeswarar Temple,
- Kambatta Viswanathar Temple and
- Ekambareswarar Temple.

This temple is one among them.

== Kumbabishegam ==
The Kumbabishegam of the temple was held on 9 September 2015.

== 9.9.2015 Kumbabishegam ==
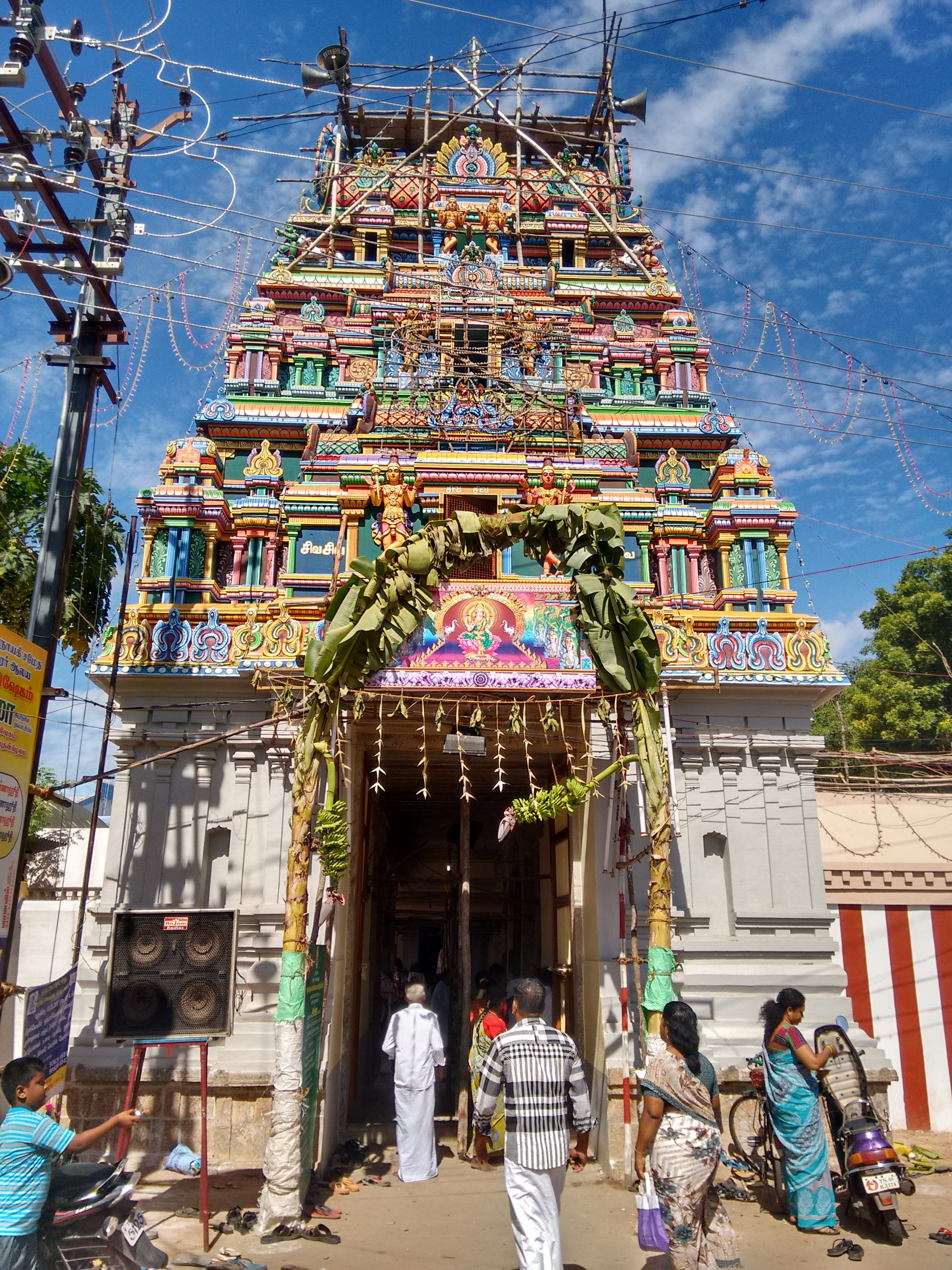

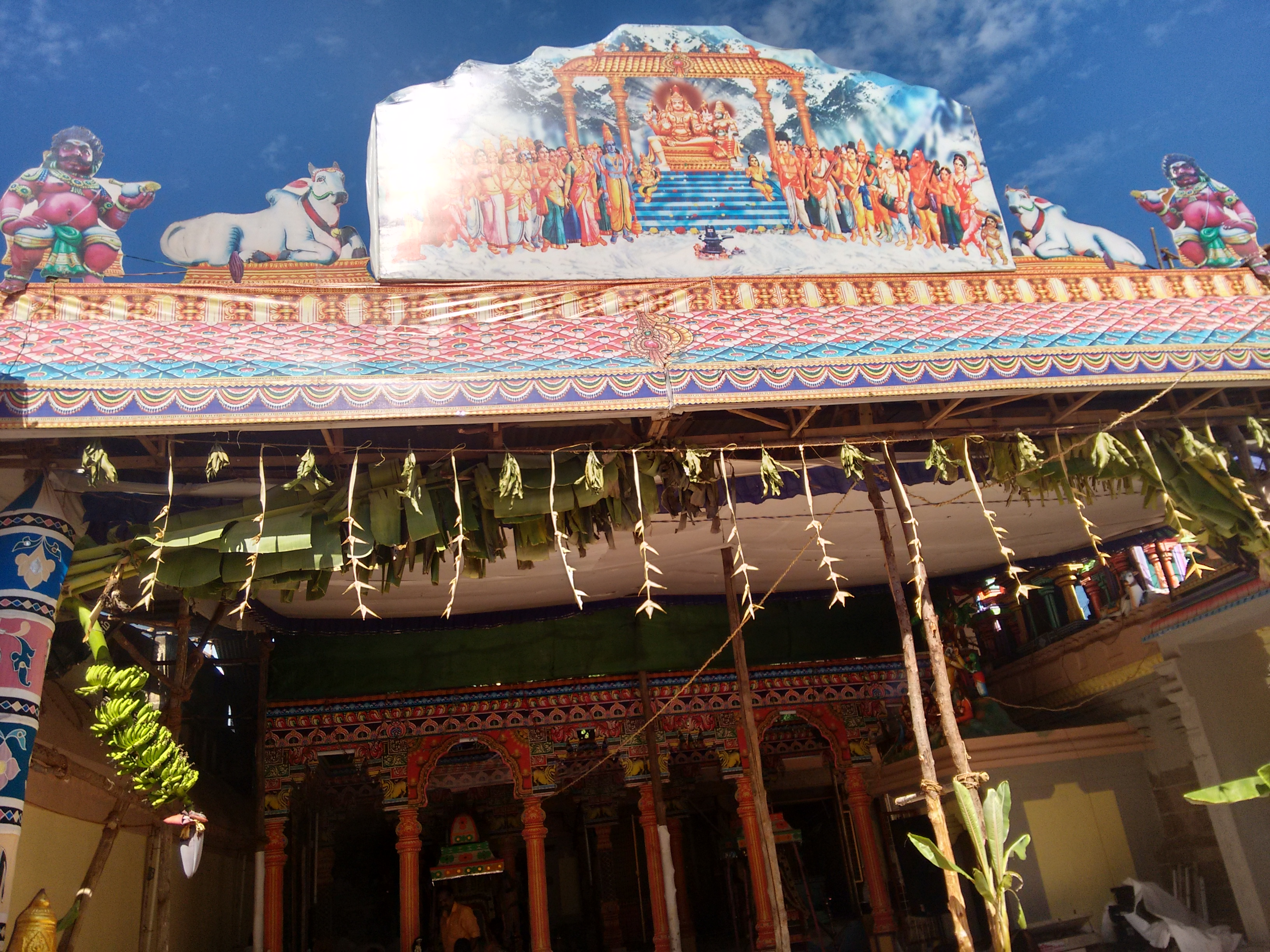

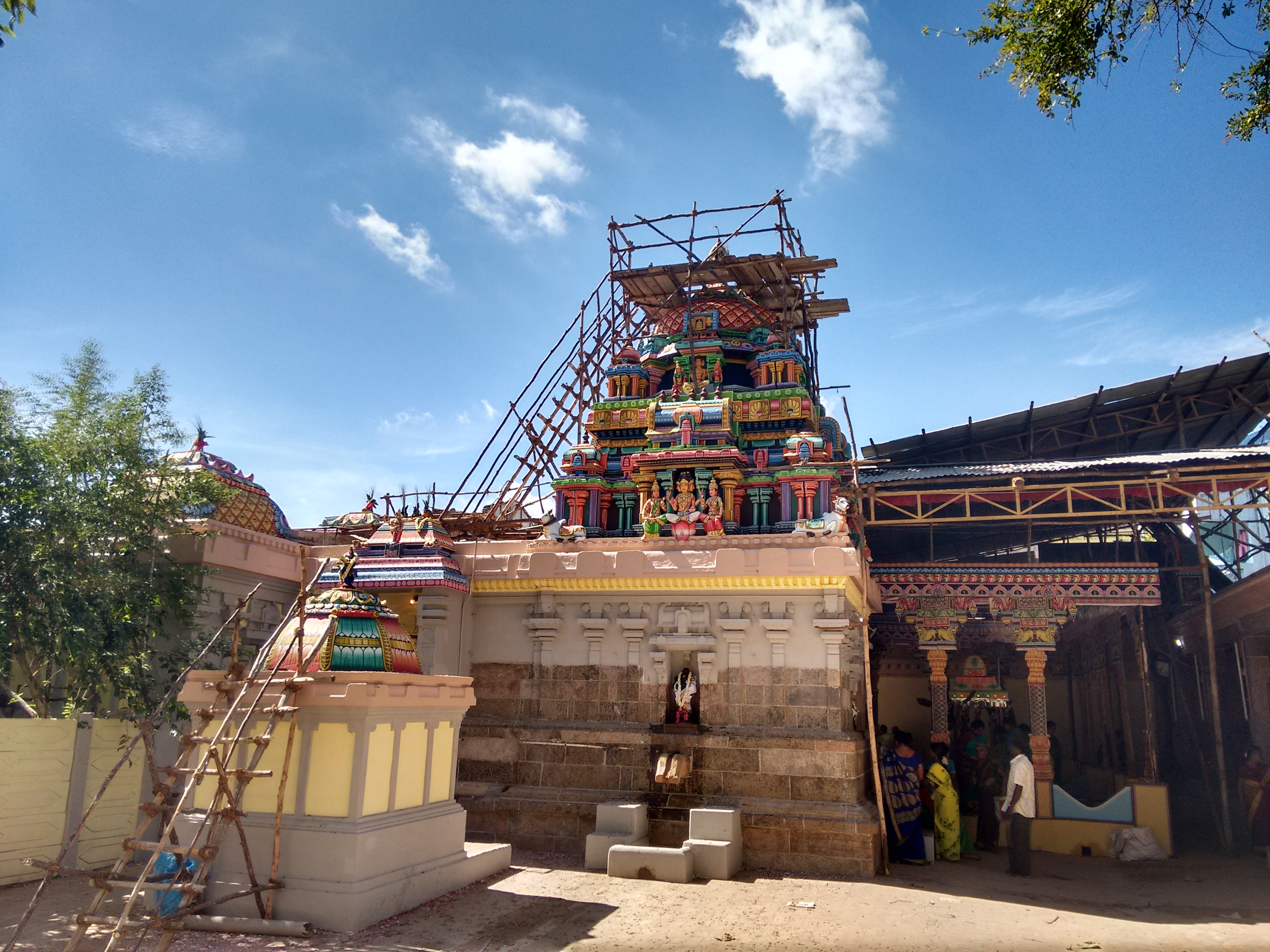

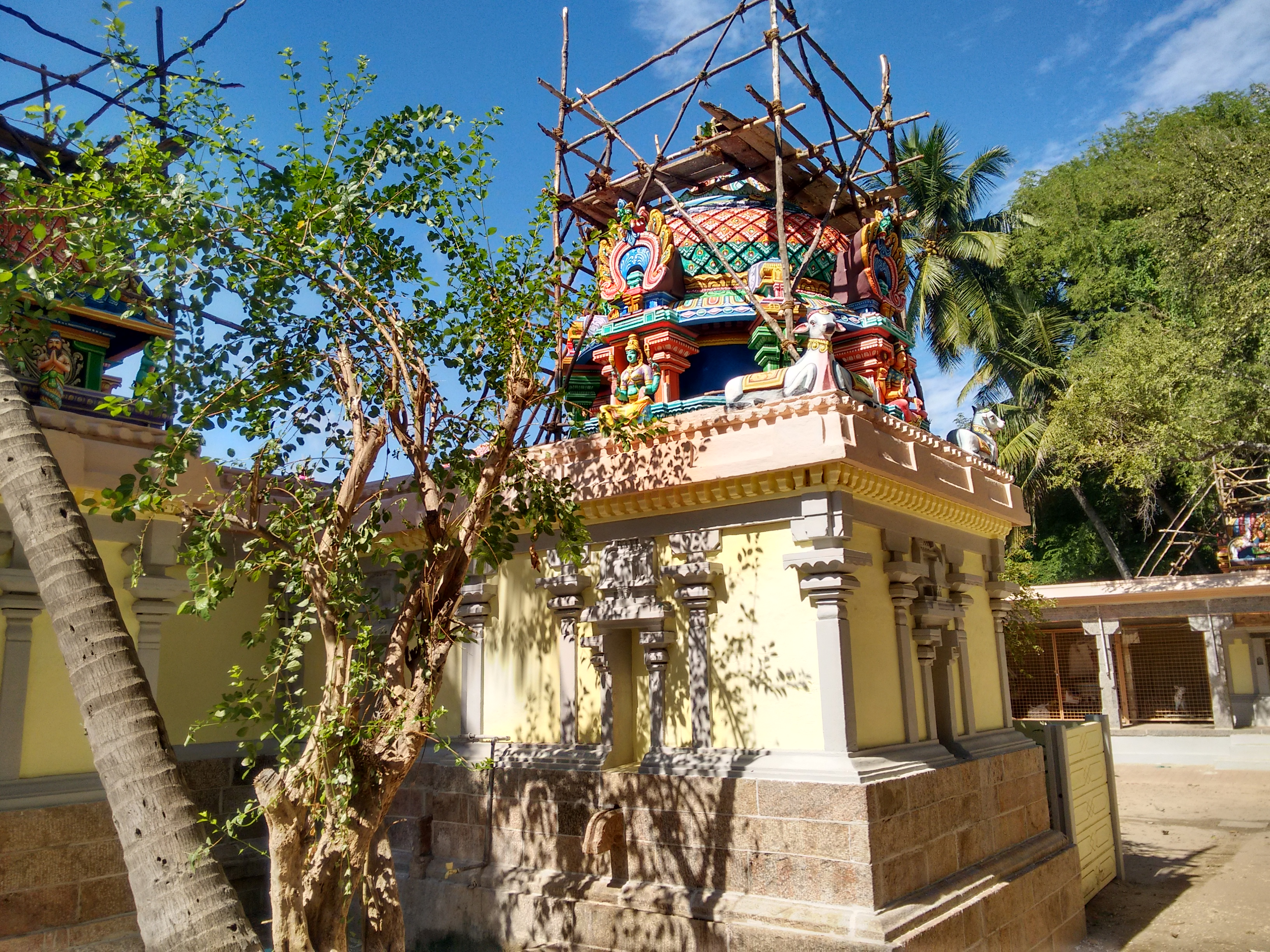

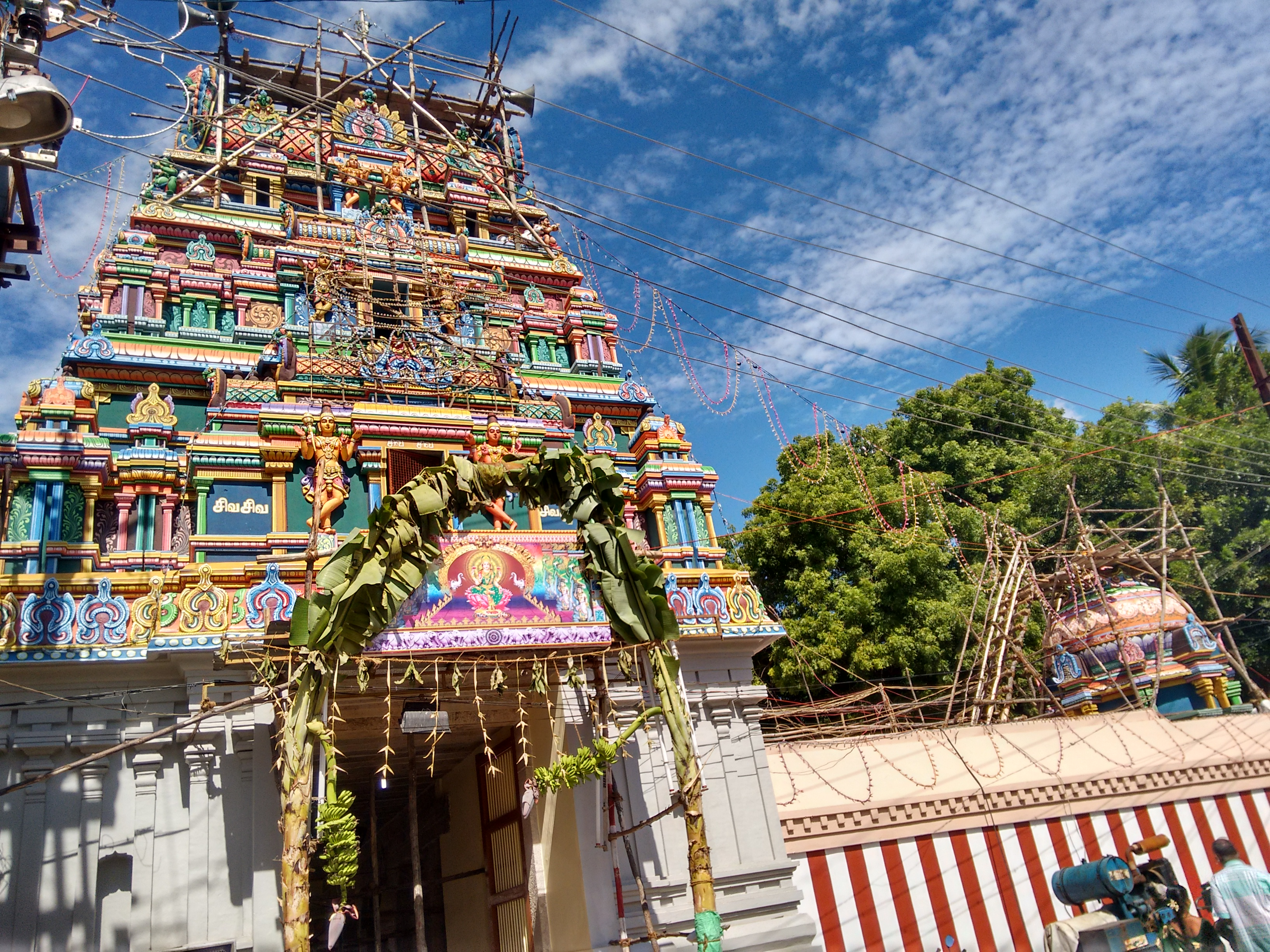

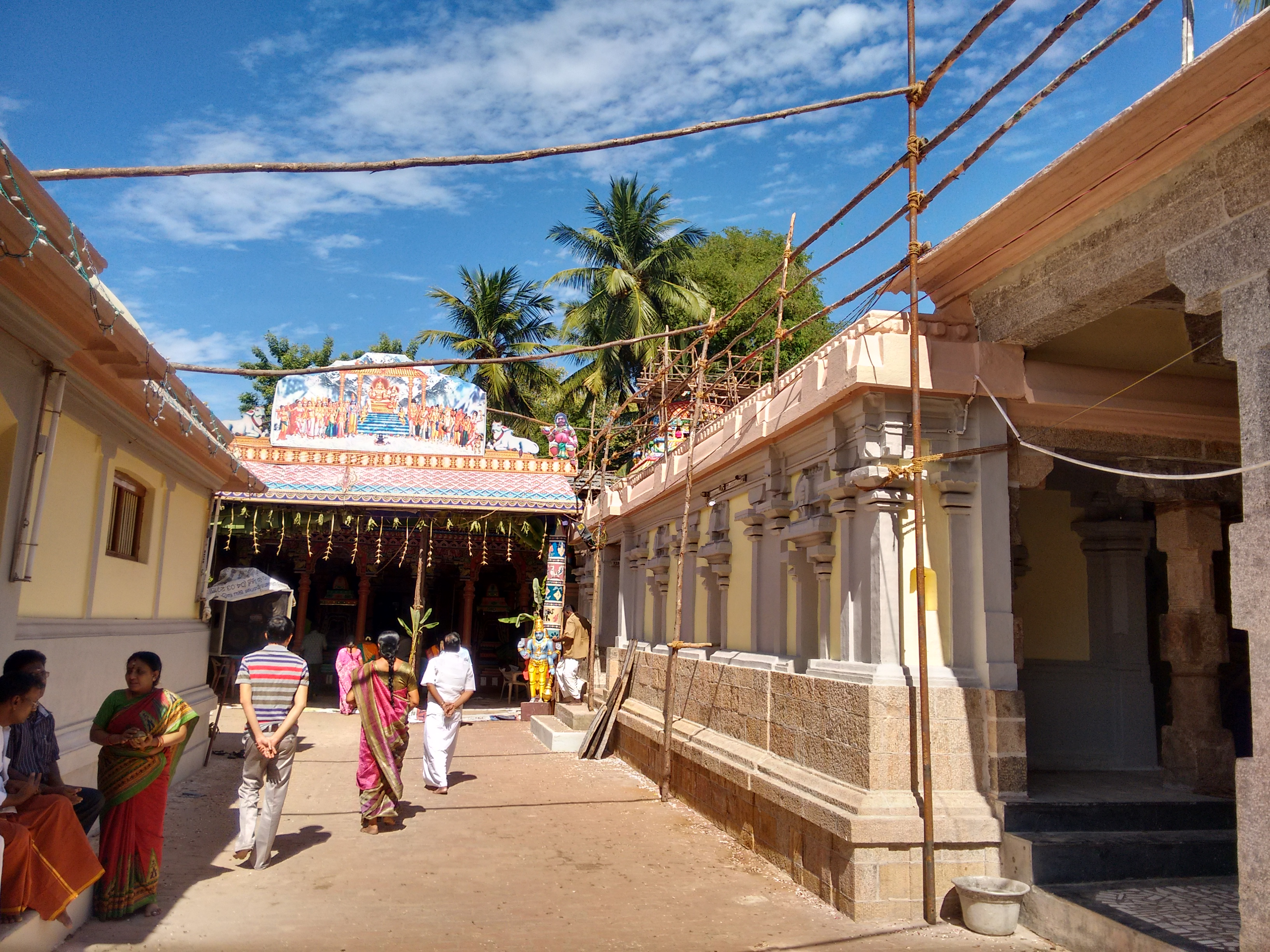

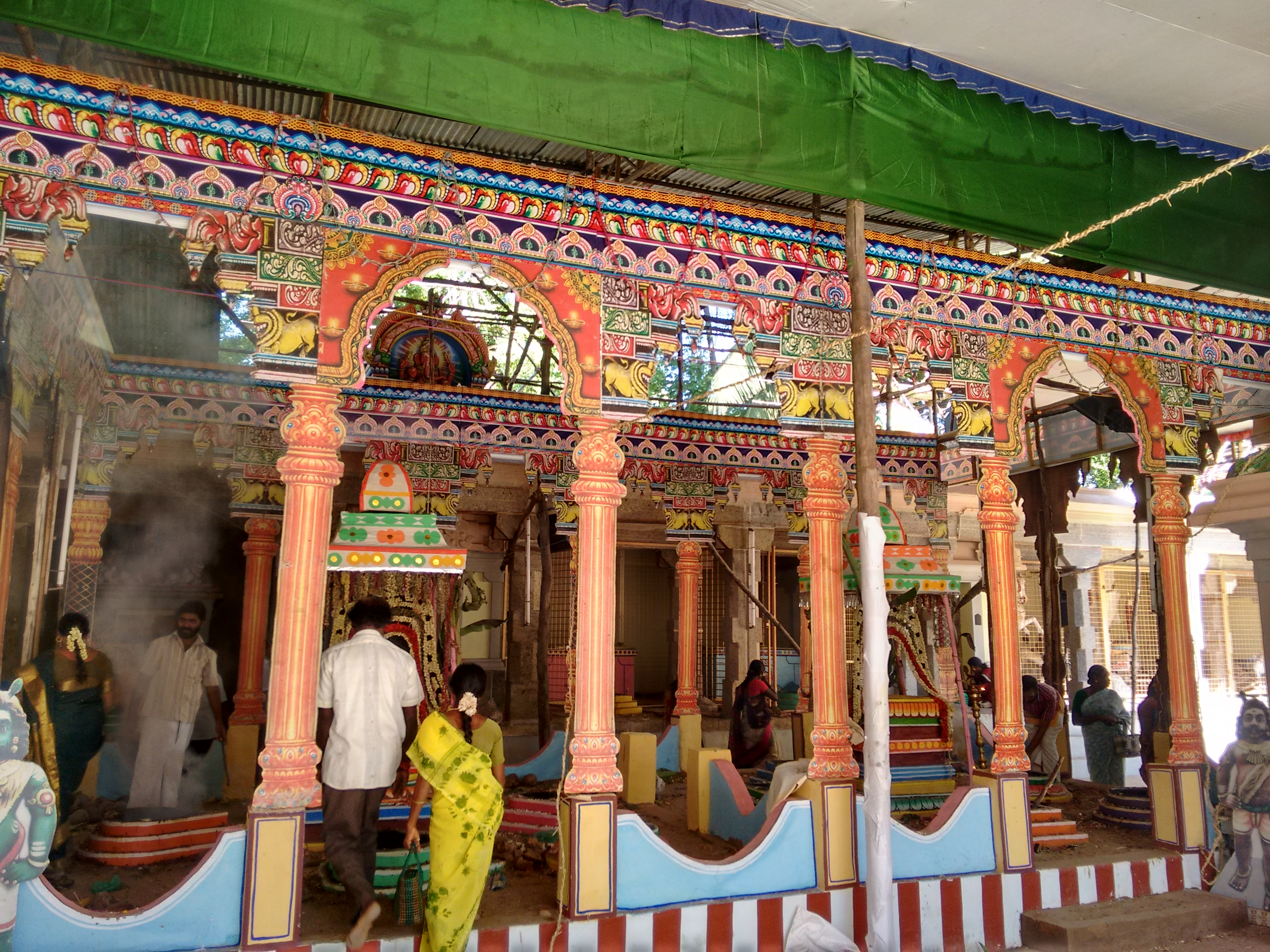
