= Abimukeswarar Temple =

Hindu temple in Tamil Nadu, India

Abimukesvarar Temple
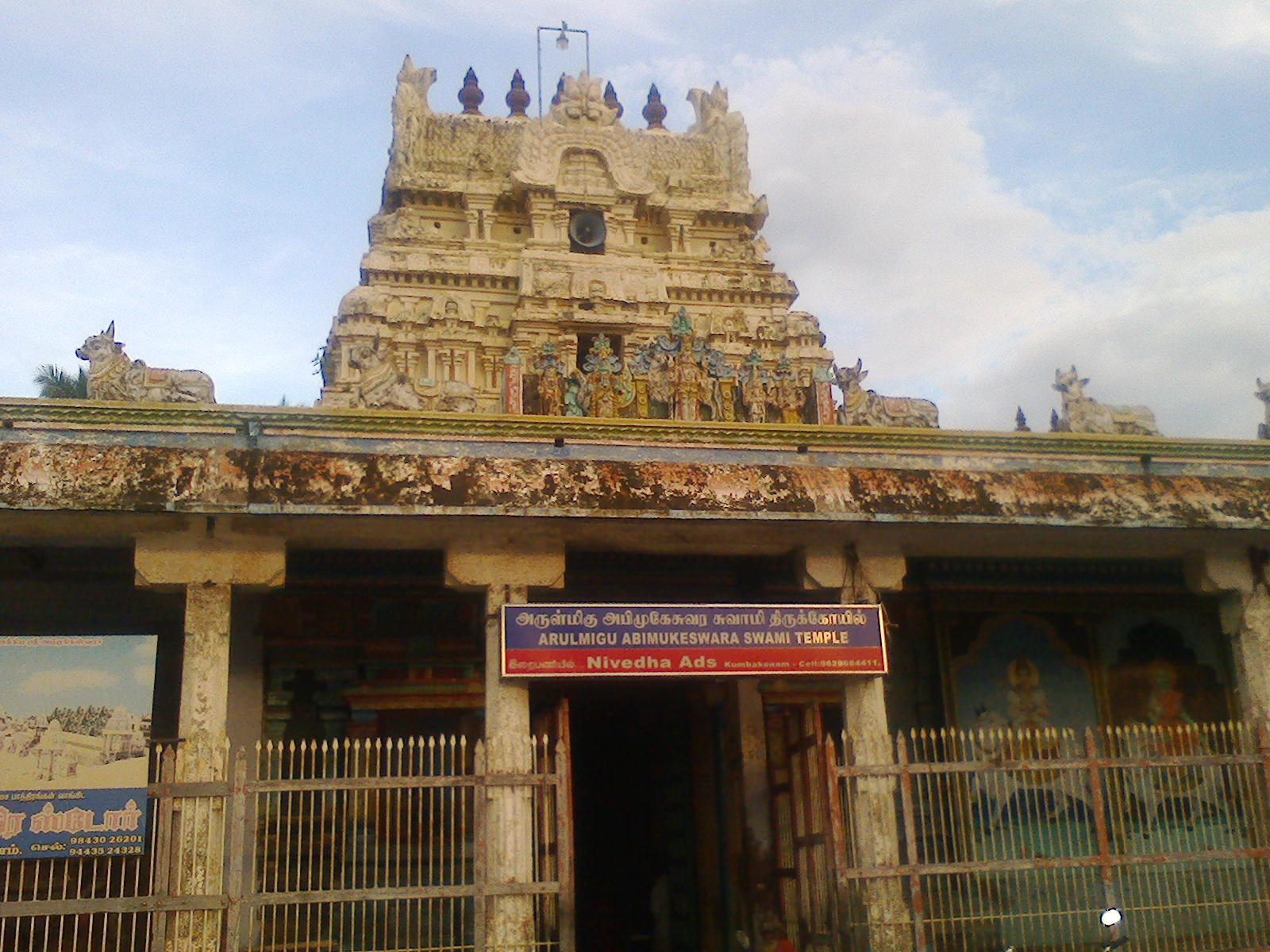
- Abimukeswarar Temple, Kumbakonam

Religion
- Affiliation: Hinduism
- District: Thanjavur
- Deity: Abimukeswarar(Shiva ) Amirthavalli (goddess)

Location
- Location: Kumbakonam
- State: Tamil Nadu
- Country: India
- Interactive map of Abimukesvarar Temple
- Coordinates: 10.955127°N 79.382802°E

Abimukeswarar Temple is a Hindu temple dedicated to Shiva located in Kumbakonam in Thanjavur district, Tamil Nadu, India. The temple is one of 12 Shiva temples connected with the Mahamaham festival, which takes place in Kumbakonam every 12 years.

== Location ==
This temple is located on the eastern bank of the Mahamaham tank, Kumbakonam. The temple is 500–1000 years old.

== Presiding deity ==
The moolavar presiding deity, is found in his manifestation as Abimukeswarar. Shiva turned around, while nava kanniyar river goddess came there, enabling them to give darshan to them, so he is known as Abimukeswarar. His consort, Parvati, is known as Amirthavalli. The sacred tree of this temple is Gooseberry.

Sani Bhagwan of this temple is taller than the other 8 planets in the Navagraga shrine.

== Mahamaham festival ==
12 Shiva temples are connected with Mahamaham festival which happens once in 12 years in Kumbakonam. They are:

- Kasi Visanathar Temple,
- Adi Kumbeswarar Temple,
- Someswarar Temple,
- Nageswaraswamy Temple,
- Kalahasteeswarar Temple,
- Gowthameswarar Temple,
- Kodeeswarar Temple,
- Amirthakadeswarar Temple,
- Banapuriswarar Temple,
- Abimukeswarar Temple,
- Kambatta Viswanathar Temple and
- Ekambareswarar Temple.

This temple is one among them.

== Mahasamprokshanam ==
The Mahasamprokshanam (also known as Kumbabishegam) of the temple was held on 26 October 2015.

=== Mahasamprokshanam, 26 October 2015 ===
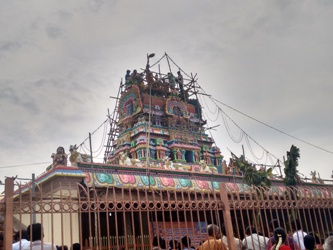

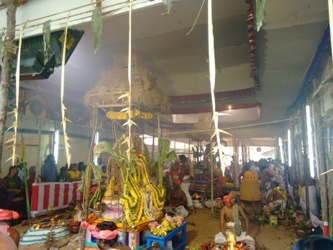

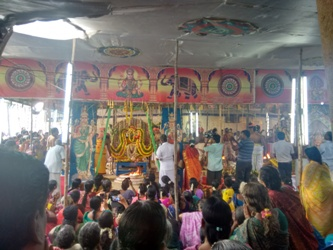

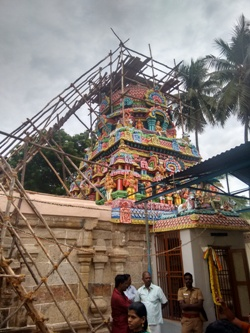

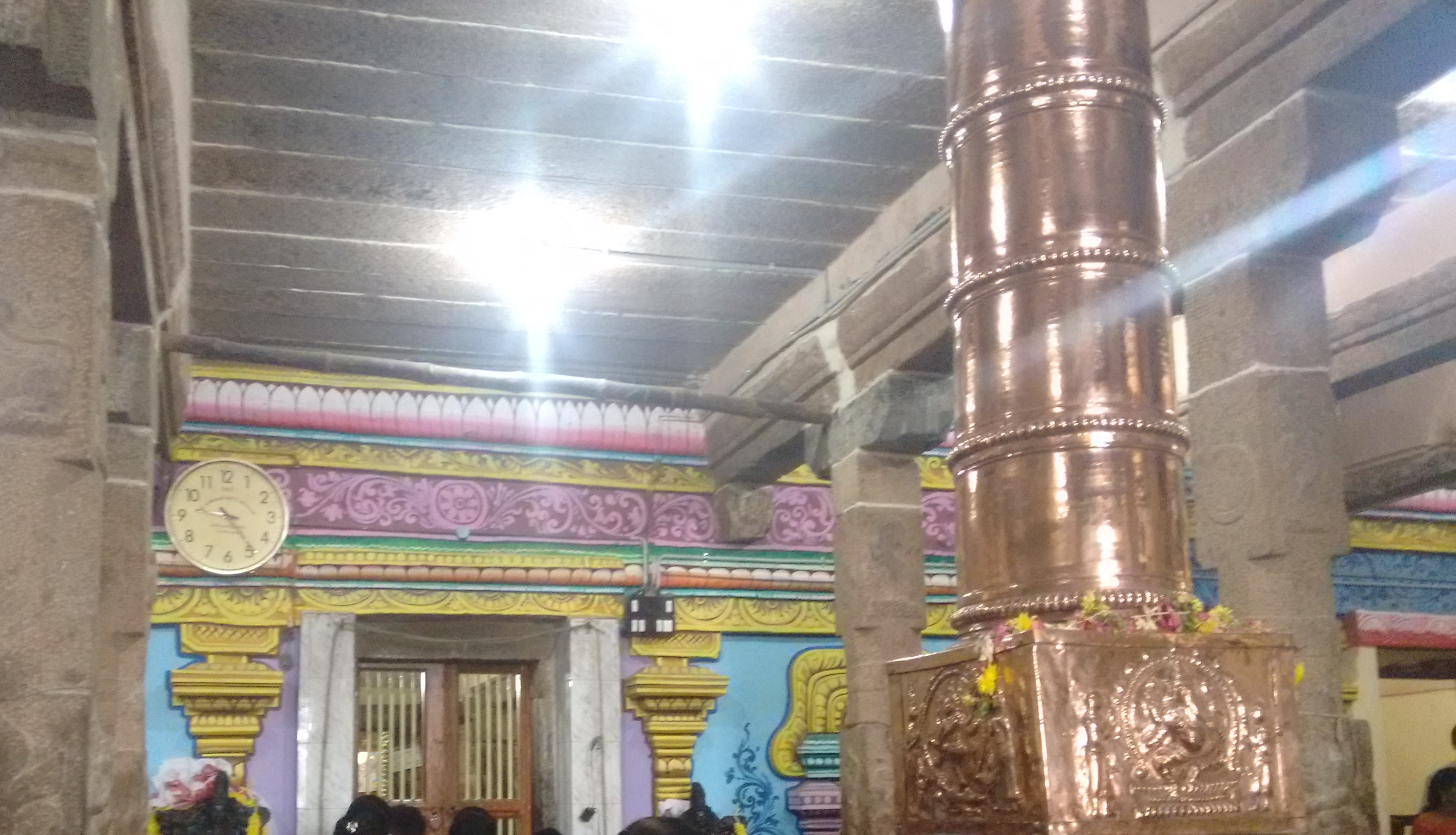

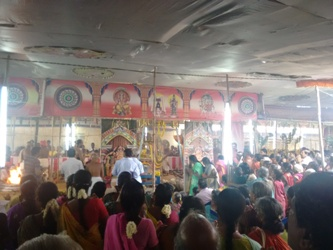

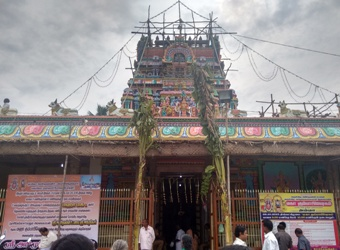

== See also ==
- Hindu temples of Kumbakonam
- Mahamaham
