= Ekambeswarar Temple, Kumbakonam =

Shiva temple in Tamil Nadu, India

Coordinates: 10.958446°N 79.380827°E

Ekambeswarar Temple
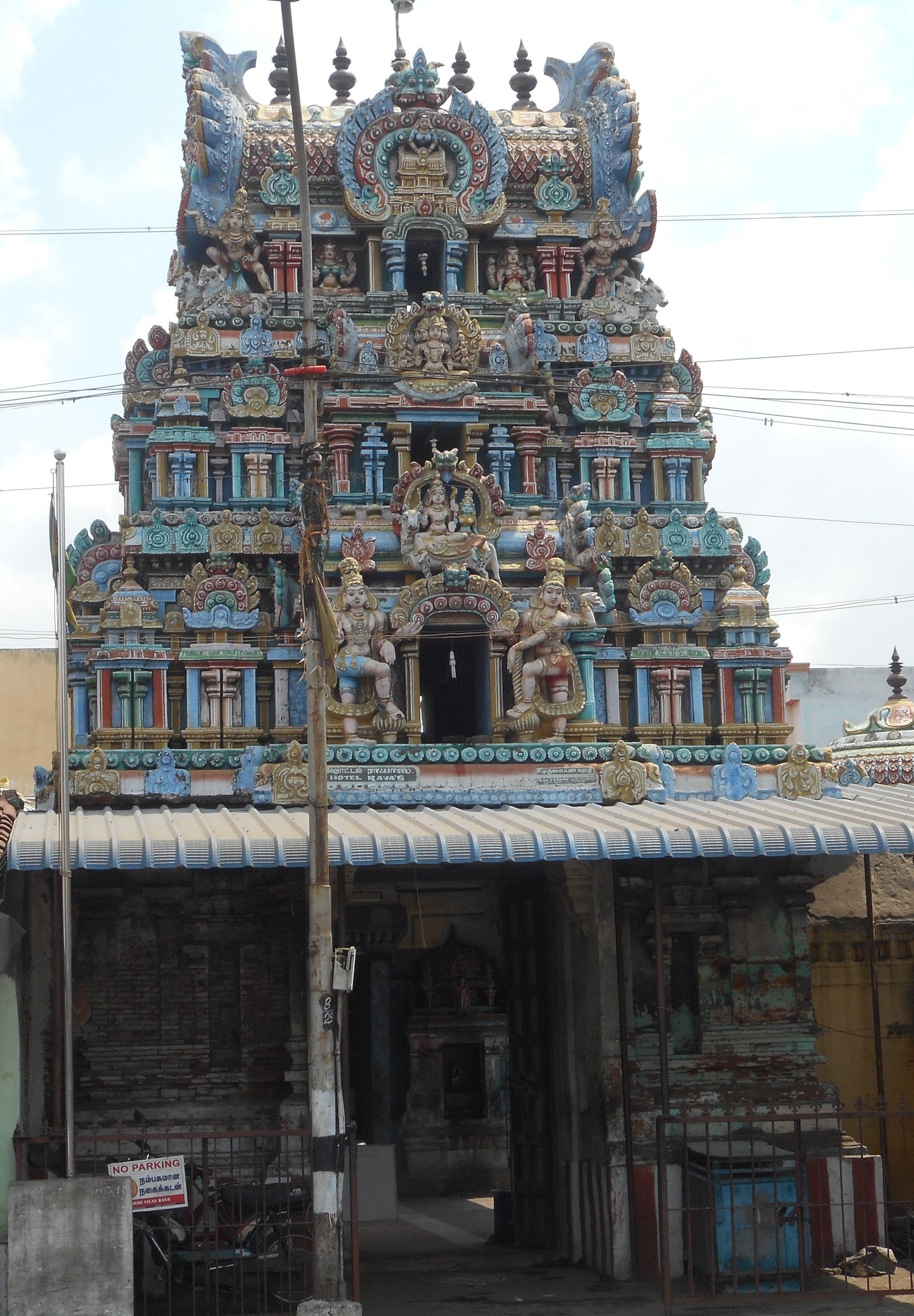
- Ekambeswarar Temple, Kumbakonam

Religion
- Affiliation: Hinduism
- District: Thanjavur
- Deity: Ekambeswarar.(Shiva ) Kamatchiamman (goddess)

Location
- Location: Kumbakonam
- State: Tamil Nadu
- Country: India

Ekambeswarar Temple is a Hindu temple dedicated to Lord Shiva located at Kumbakonam in Thanjavur district, Tamil Nadu, India.

== Presiding deity ==
The moolavar presiding deity, is found in his manifestation as Ekambeswarar. His consort, Parvati, is known as Kamatchiamman.

== Specialty ==
12 Shiva temples are connected with Mahamaham festival which happens once in 12 years in Kumbakonam. They are:

- Kasi Visanathar Temple,
- Adi Kumbeswarar Temple,
- Someswarar Temple,
- Nageswaraswamy Temple,
- Kalahasteeswarar Temple,
- Gowthameswarar Temple,
- Kodeeswarar Temple,
- Amirthakadeswarar Temple,
- Banapuriswarar Temple,
- Abimukeswarar Temple,
- Kambatta Viswanathar Temple and
- Ekambareswarar Temple.

This temple is one among them.

== Kali Amman ==
There is a separate shrine for Kali Amman.

== See also ==
- Hindu temples of Kumbakonam
- Mahamaham

== Kumbabishegam ==
The Kumbabishegam of the temple was held on 22 October 2015.

== Kumbabishegam 22 October 2015 ==
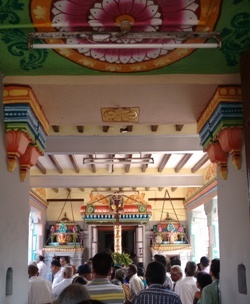

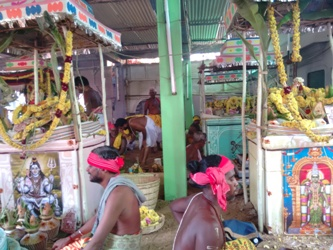

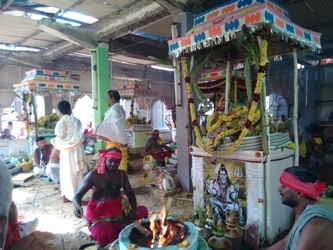

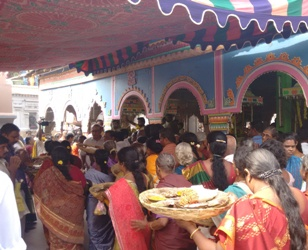

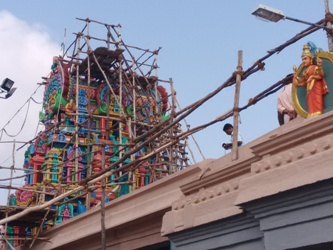

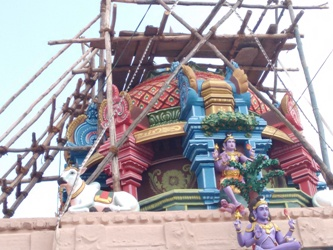

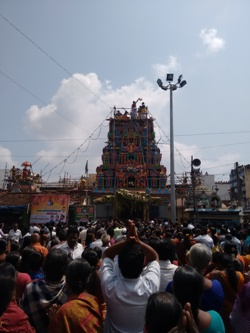
