= Banapuriswarar Temple =

Coordinates: 10.964657°N 79.381689°E

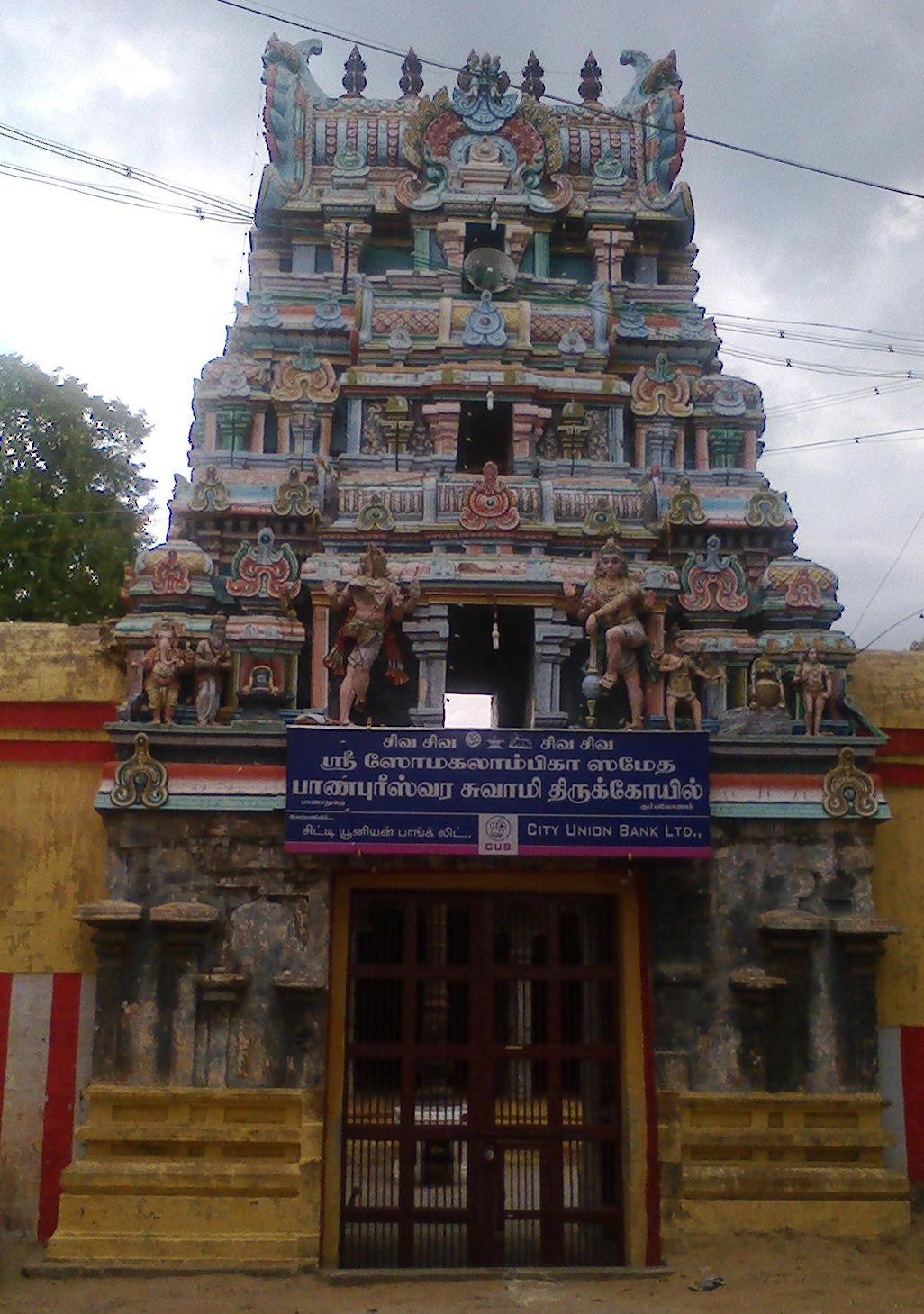
- Banapuriswarar Temple, Kumbakonam

Religion
- Affiliation: Hinduism
- District: Thanjavur
- Deity: Banapuriswarar(Shiva ) Somakamalambal (goddess)

Location
- Location: Kumbakonam
- State: Tamil Nadu
- Country: India
- Interactive map of Banapuriswarar Temple

Banapuriswarar Temple is a Hindu temple located in the town of Kumbakonam in Tamil Nadu, India. It is dedicated to the Hindu god Shiva. According to Hindu mythology, the site was the place from where Shiva took his aim at a pot of amrita with his bow and arrow.

== Specialty ==
12 Shiva temples are connected with Mahamaham festival which happens once in 12 years in Kumbakonam. They are:

- Kasi Visanathar Temple,
- Adi Kumbeswarar Temple,
- Someswarar Temple,
- Nageswaraswamy Temple,
- Kalahasteeswarar Temple,
- Gowthameswarar Temple,
- Kodeeswarar Temple,
- Amirthakadeswarar Temple,
- Banapuriswarar Temple,
- Abimukeswarar Temple,
- Kambatta Viswanathar Temple and
- Ekambareswarar Temple.

This temple is one among them.

== Mahasamprokshanam ==
The Mahasamprokshanam also known as Kumbabishegam of the temple was held on 26 October 2015.

== Mahasamprokshanam 26 October 2015 ==
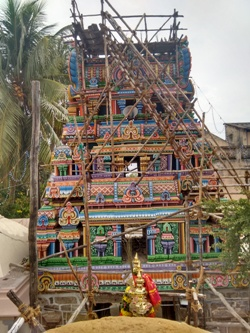

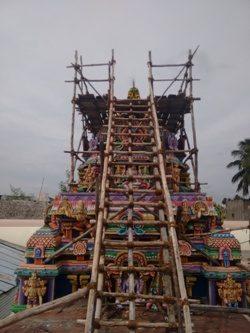

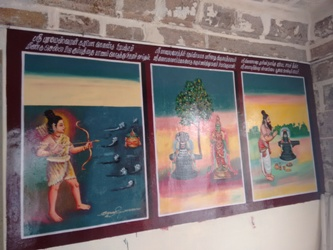

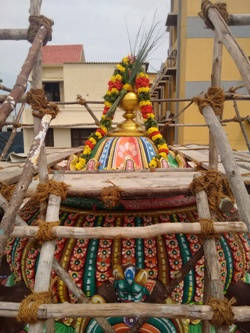

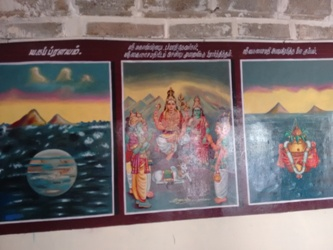

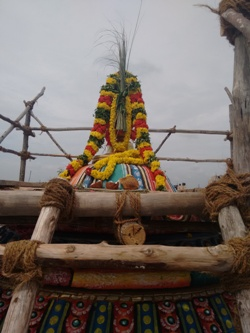

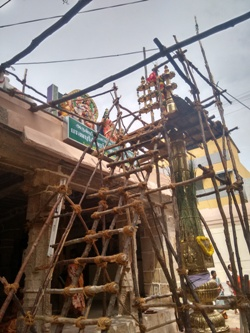
