= Kalahasteeswarar Temple =

Shiva temple in Tamil Nadu, India

Coordinates: 10.966319°N 79.377602°E

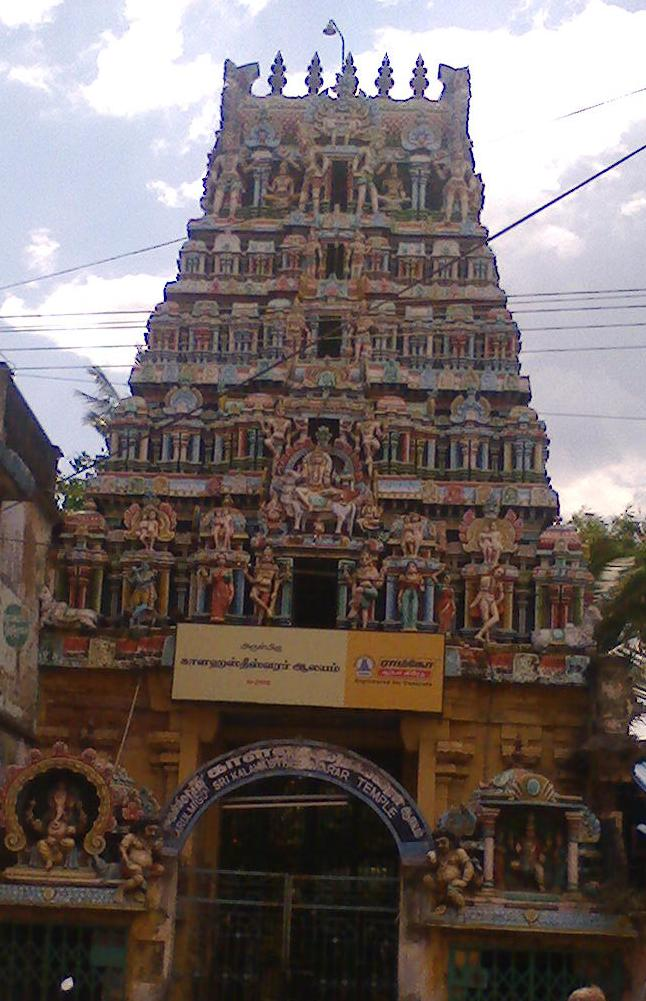
- Kalahasteeswarar Temple, Kumbakonam

Religion
- Affiliation: Hinduism
- District: Thanjavur
- Deity: Kalahasteeswarar(Shiva ) Gnanambikai (goddess)
- Governing body

Location
- Location: Kumbakonam
- State: Tamil Nadu
- Country: India
- Interactive map of Kalahasteeswarar Temple

Kalahasteeswarar Temple is a Hindu temple dedicated to Shiva located at Kumbakonam in Thanjavur district, Tamil Nadu, India.

== Presiding deity ==
The moolavar presiding deity, is found in his manifestation as Kalahasteeswarar. His consort, Parvati, is known as Gnanambikai.

== Specialty ==
12 Shiva temples are connected with Mahamaham festival which happens once in 12 years in Kumbakonam. They are:

- Kasi Visanathar Temple,
- Adi Kumbeswarar Temple,
- Someswarar Temple,
- Nageswaraswamy Temple,
- Kalahasteeswarar Temple,
- Gowthameswarar Temple,
- Kodeeswarar Temple,
- Amirthakadeswarar Temple,
- Banapuriswarar Temple,
- Abimukeswarar Temple,
- Kambatta Viswanathar Temple and
- Ekambareswarar Temple.

This temple is one among them.

== Renovation ==
The temple was renovated by Serfoji of Thanjavur.

== Mahasamprokshanam ==
The Mahasamprokshanam also known as Kumbabishegam of the temple was held on 26 October 2015.

== See also ==
- Hindu temples of Kumbakonam
- Mahamaham

== Mahasamprokshanam 26 October 2015 ==
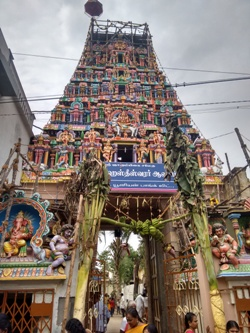

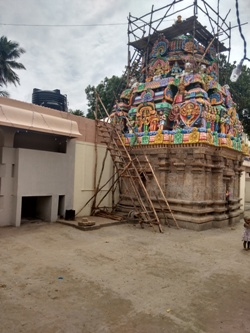

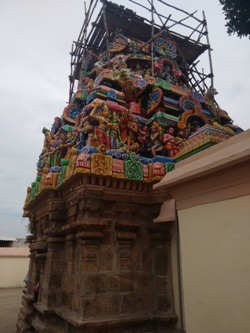

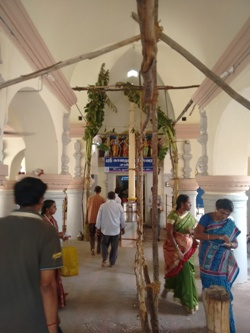

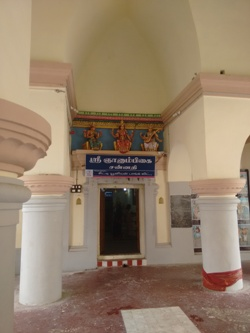

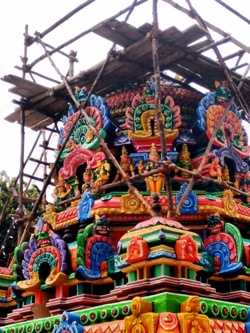

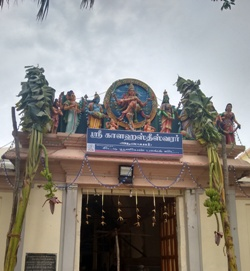
