= Potramarai Tank =

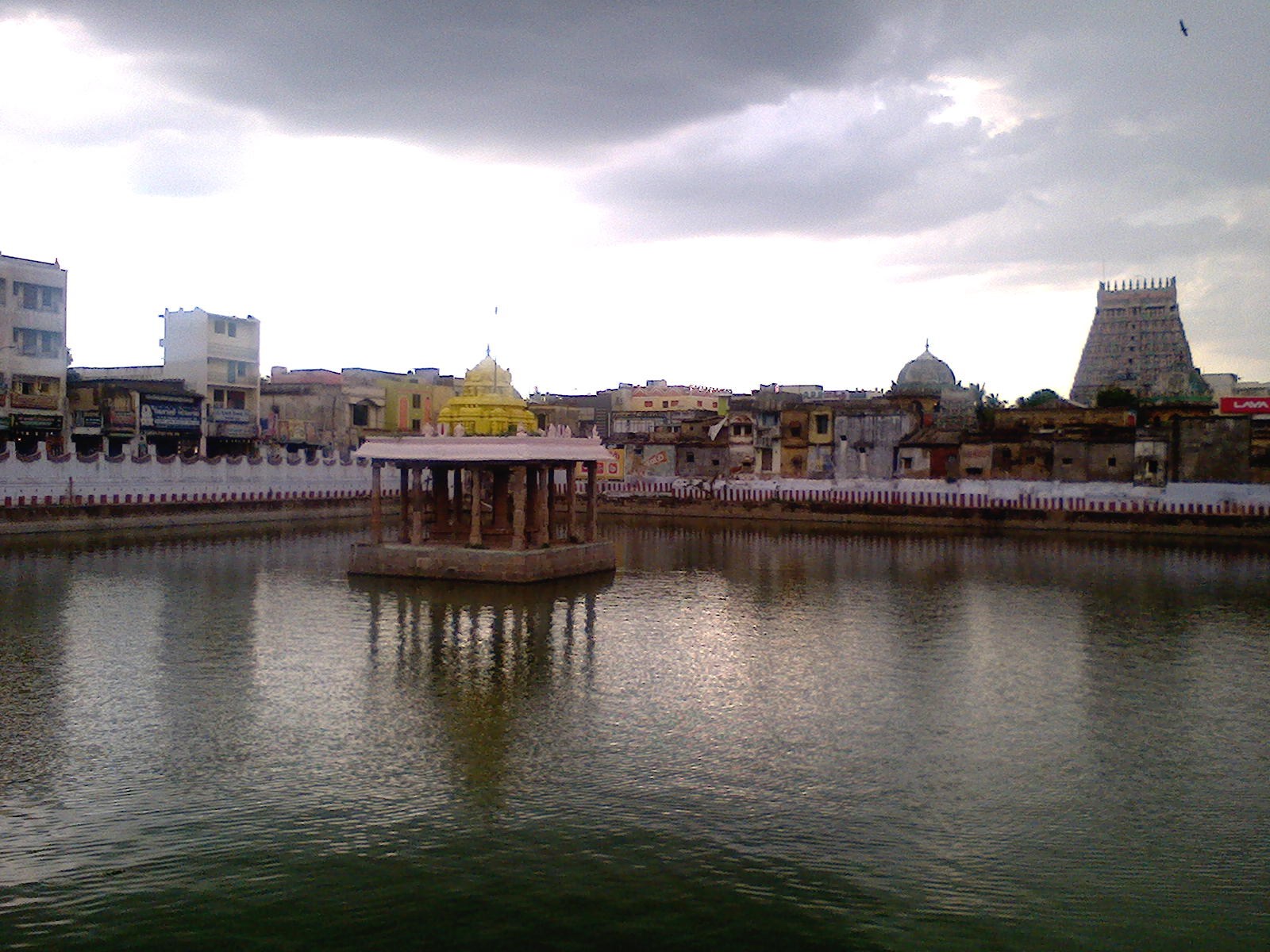
Potramarai Tank

Potramarai Tank is situated at Kumbakonam in the Thanjavur district, Tamil Nadu, India.

== Location ==
After Pralaya, of the two holy tanks that came into existence in Kumbakonam one was Potramarai tank. As Thirumagal came from 'golden lotus', Potramarai in Tamil, this tank is called as Potramarai tank. In Kumbakonam, this is considered very sacred, the first being the Mahamaham tank. This tank belonged to Sarangapani temple. The tank has walls on all its four sides. Once writers used to mingle on the banks of the tank.

== Holy water bodies ==
Potramarai tank, Cavuery and Arasalar are considered as the sacred water bodies of the Sarangapani Temple. By this way this temple gets importance.

== Mahamaham connection ==
The 12-year cycle Mahamaham festival in Tamil Nadu is observed in the Hindu calendar month of Magha. On the day of Masi Maham, devotees in large numbers come to Kumbakonam and take a bath in Mahamaham tank, the tank which is considered sacred as nine sacred rivers of India such as Ganges, Kaveri, Yamuna, Sarasvati, Godavari, Narmada, Krishna, Sindhu and Sarayu mingle in Mahamaham tank. After having a bath, next they come to Potramarai tank and then to Cauvery.

== Tradition ==
The sage Hemarishi did penance for getting Lakshmi as his daughter. His prayer was answered and Lakshmi appeared as a child in Potramarai tank. As part of Amrita, the nectar halted in this place and the goddess, as child appeared here, this place is considered very important. The nine rivers mingle at Mahamaham tank and get rid of their sins. It is believed that taking a bath at that time in Potramarai tank will give Punya (Hinduism) to the devotees, as the nine rivers had sacred bath at Potramarai Tank after Mahamaham Tank, those come to Mahamaham are doing so.

== 2016 Mahamaham ==
During 2016 Mahamaham this tank was filled with water for having bath for Mahamaham. Trial for Tirttavari was held on 6 February 2016. For Shiva temples it was held on 22 February 2016 between 12.00 noon and 1.30 p.m. in Mahamaham Tank. For five Vishnu temples it was held on the banks of Kaveri. Those five temples are Sarangapani Temple, Chakrapani Temple, Ramaswamy Temple, Rajagopalaswamy Temple, and Varahaperumal Temple.

== Photogallery ==
=== Potramarai Tank ===
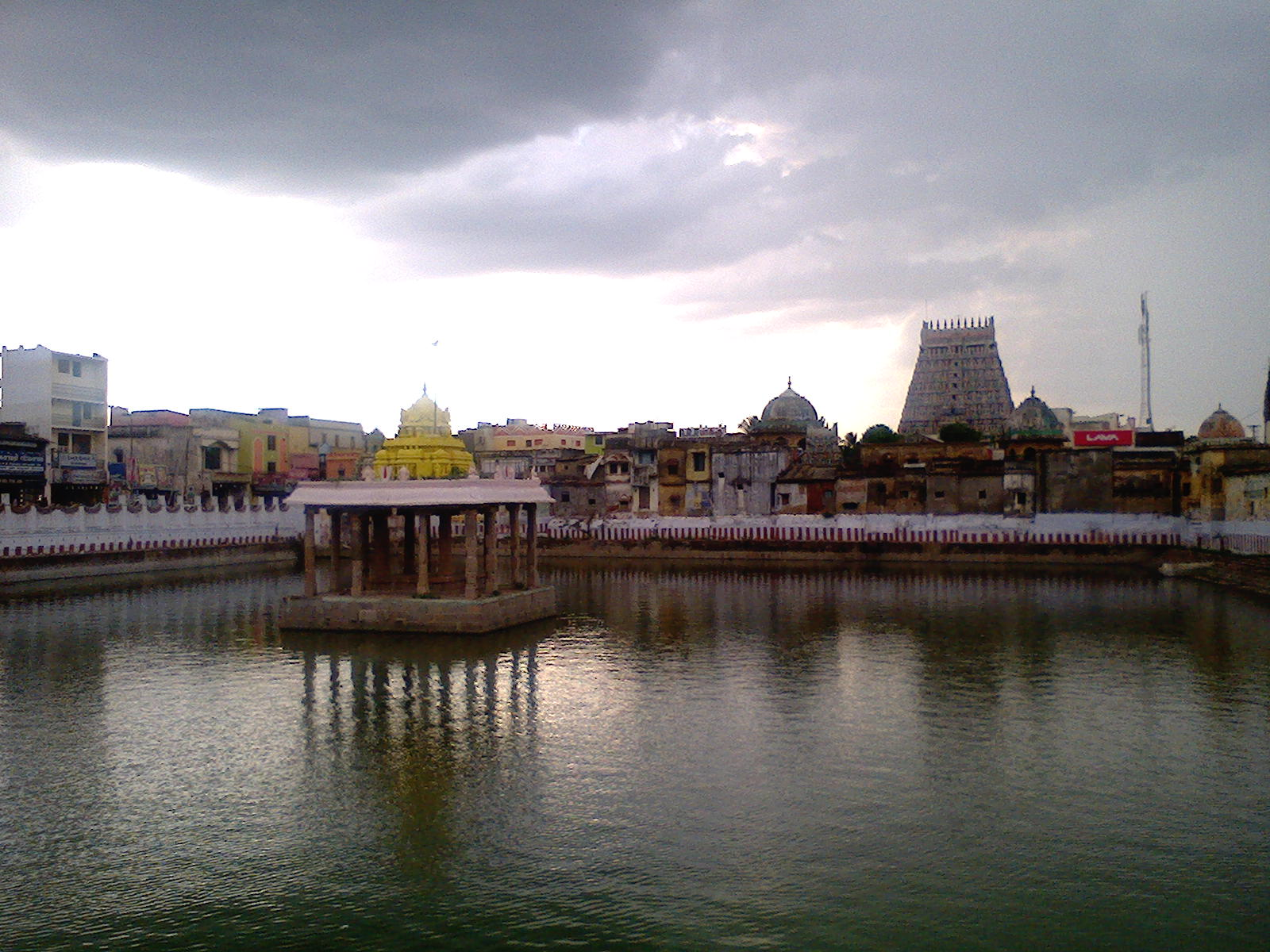

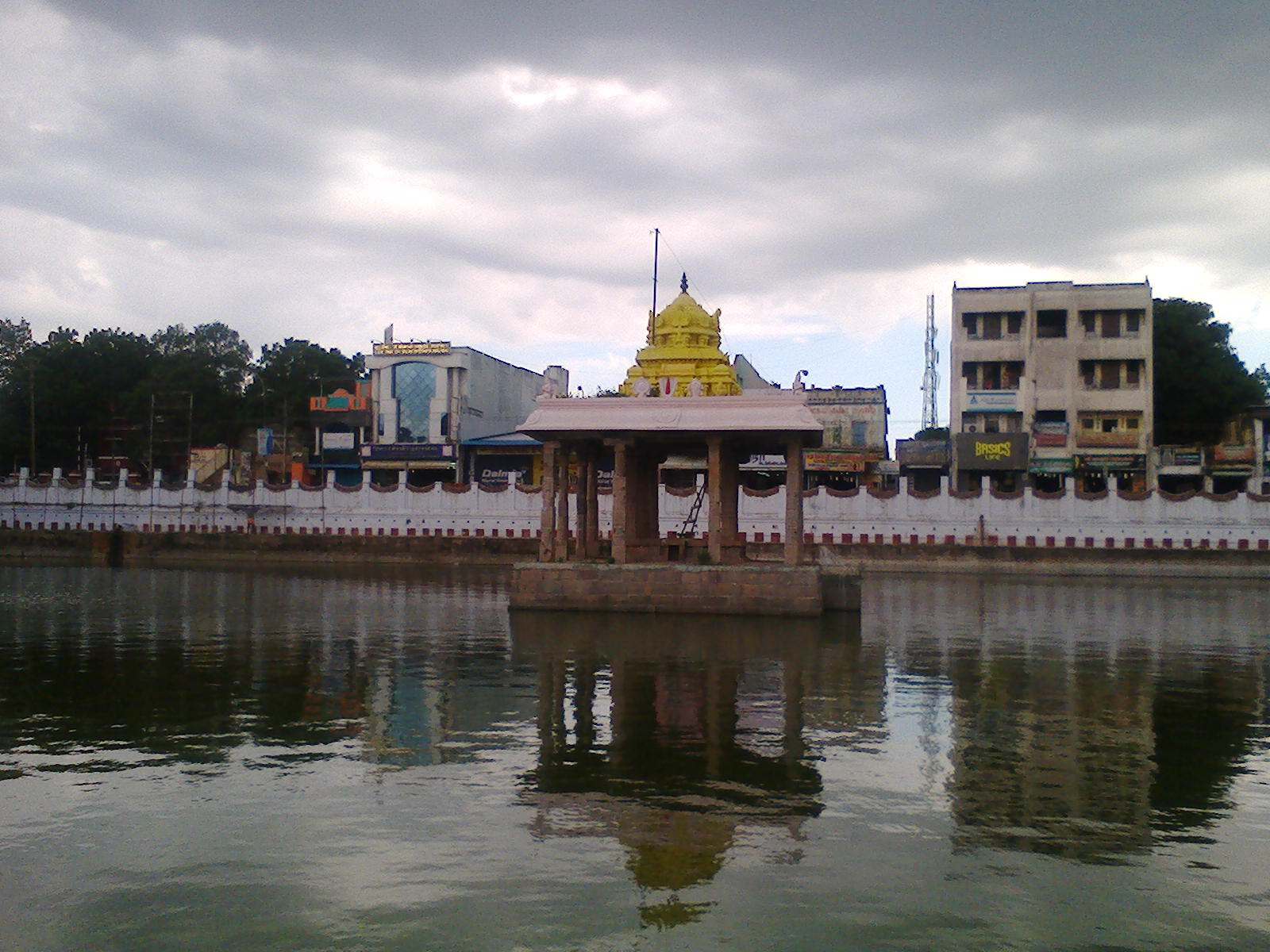

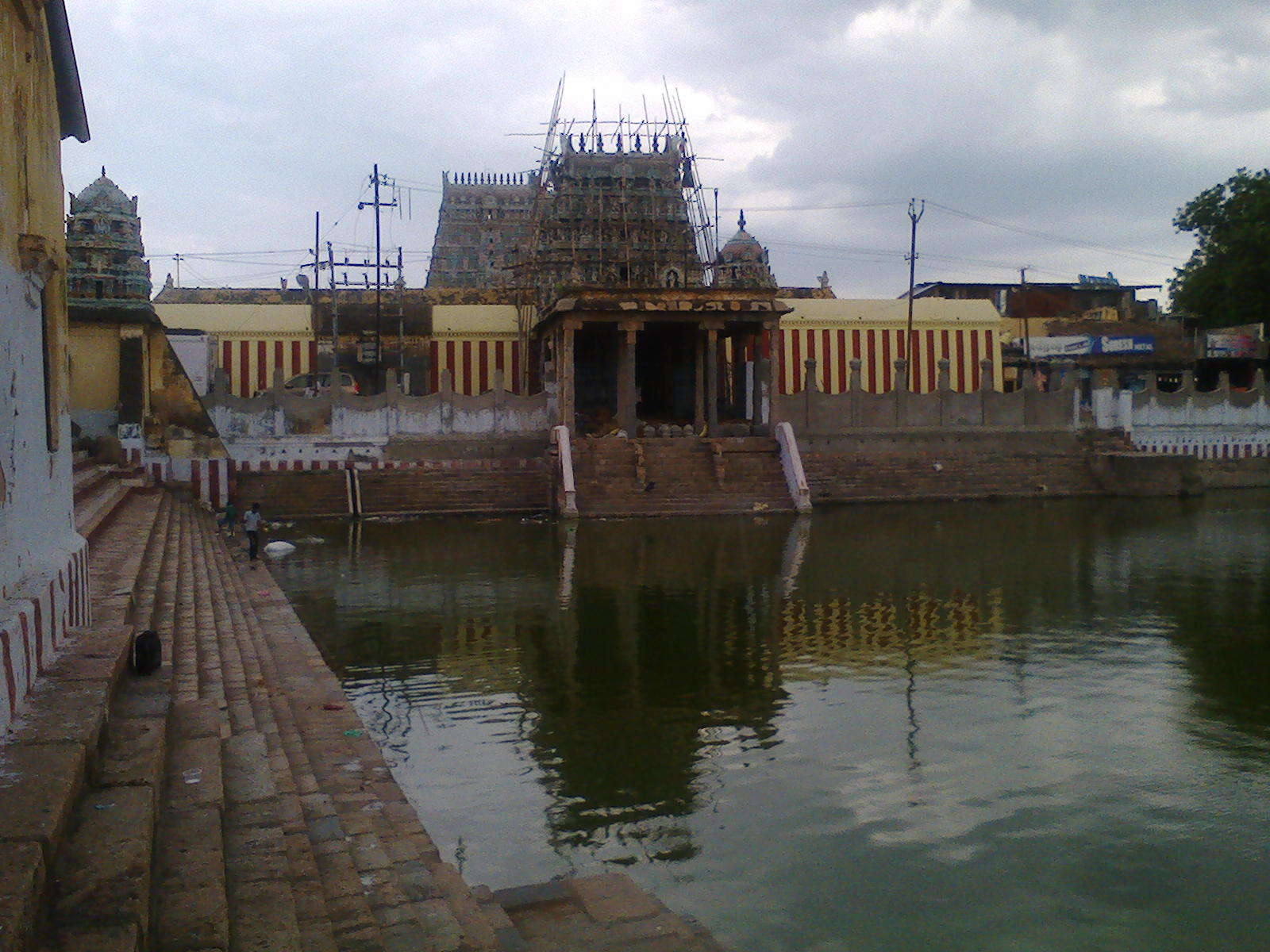

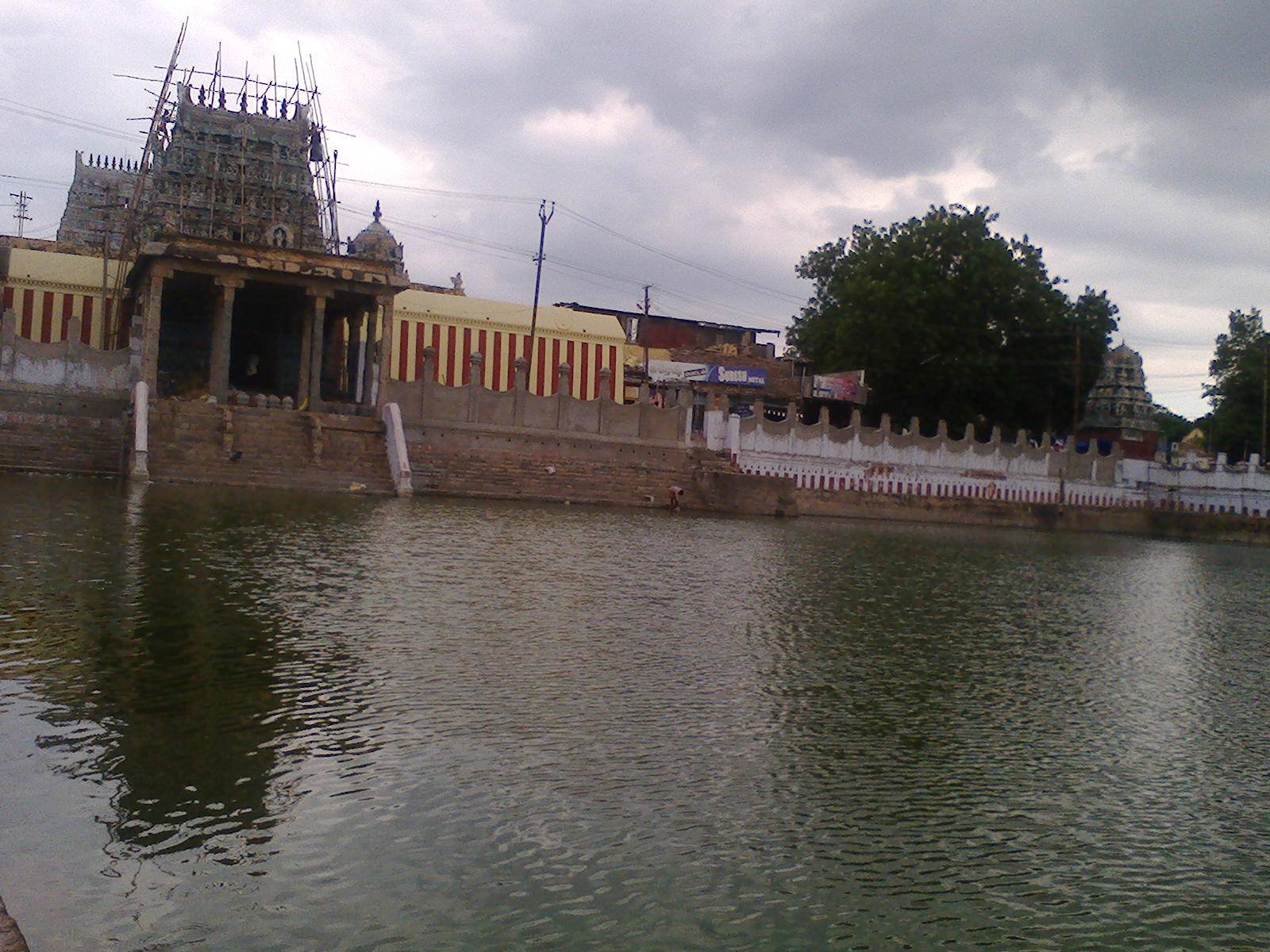

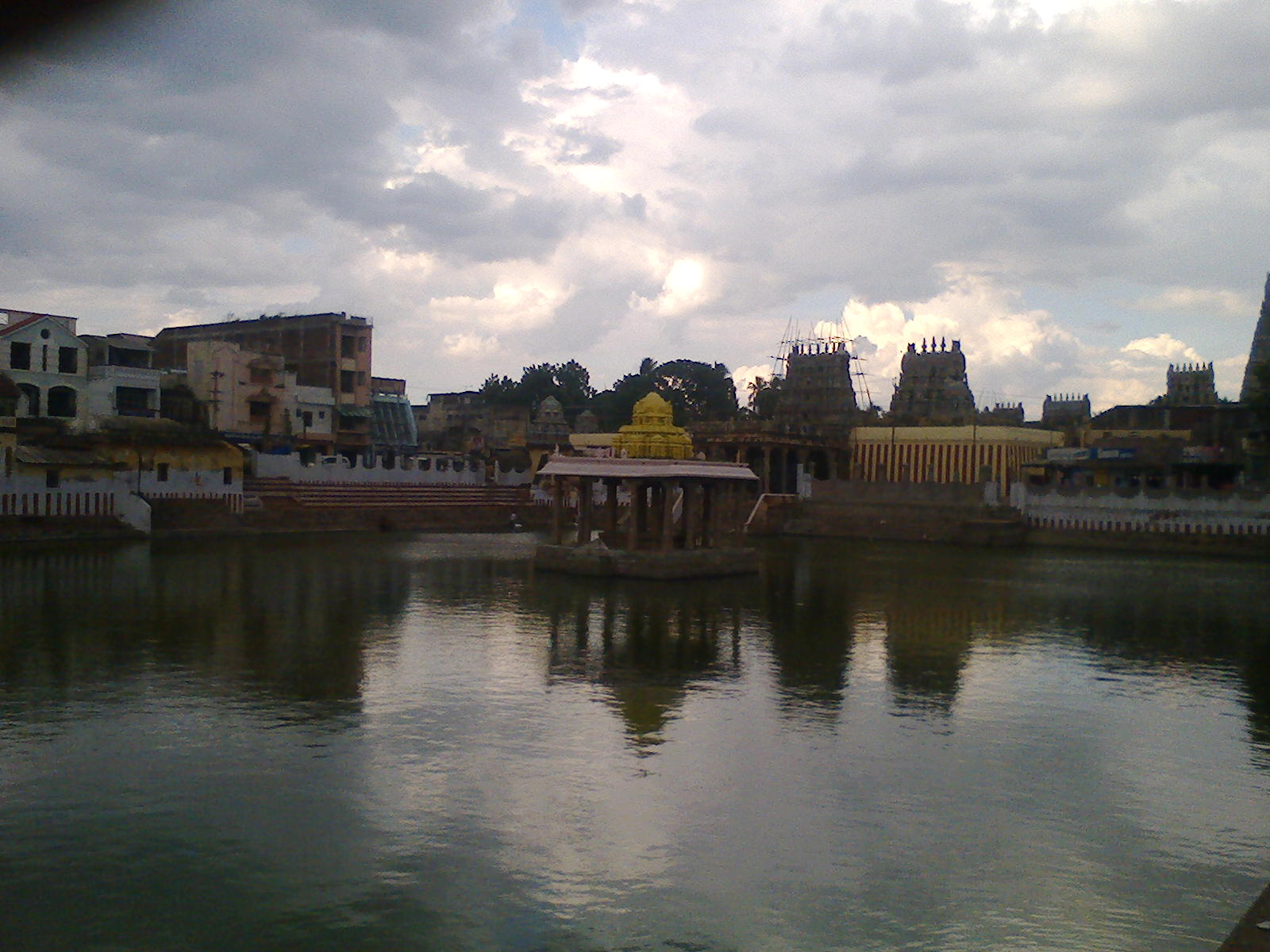

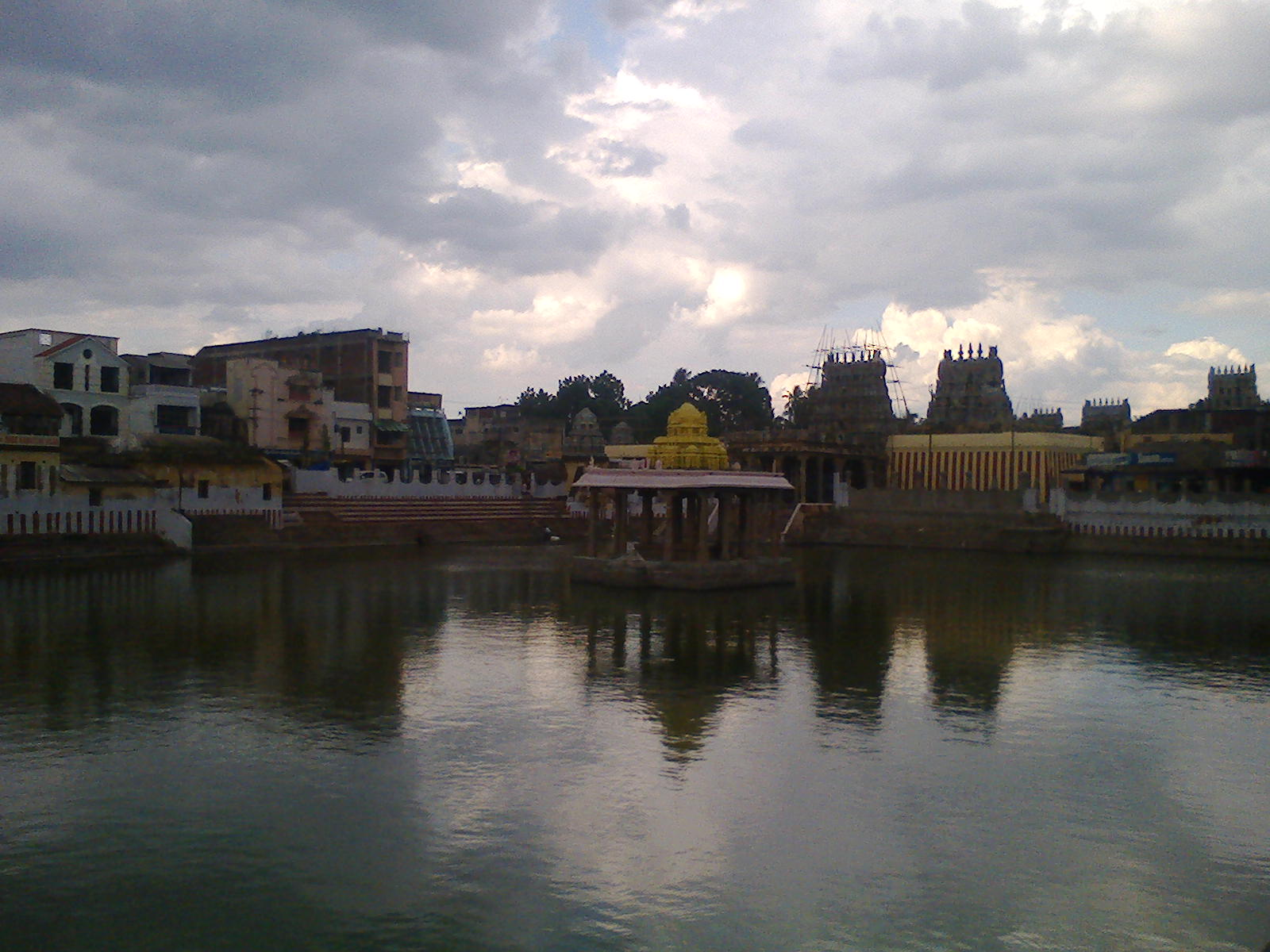

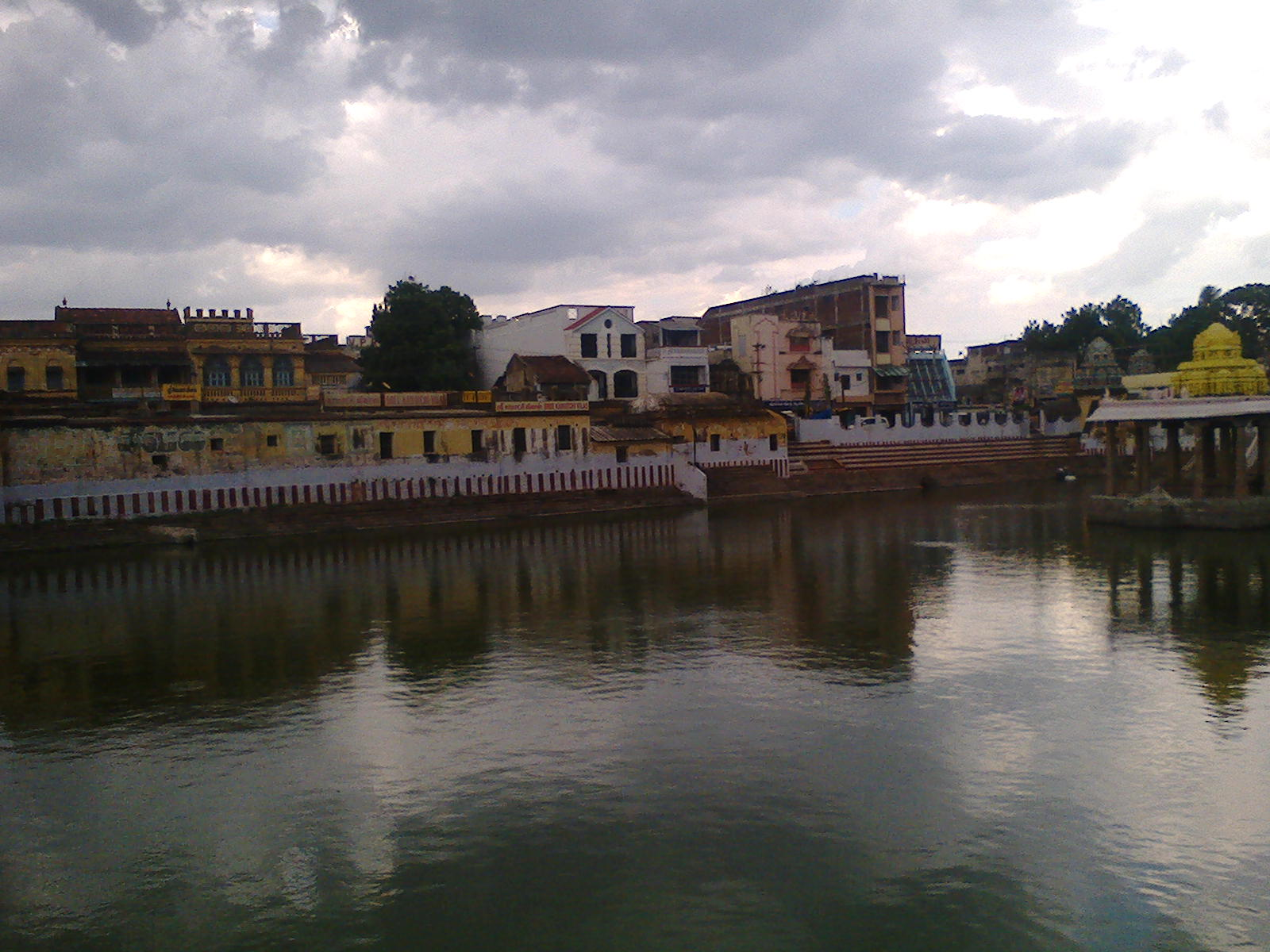

=== Devotees taking bath during 2016 Mahamaham ===
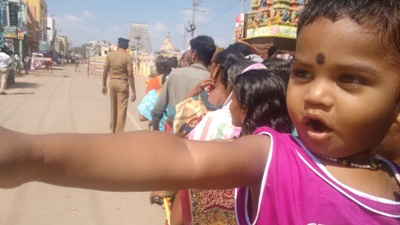

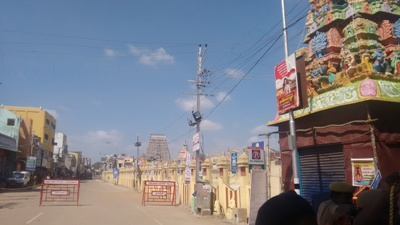

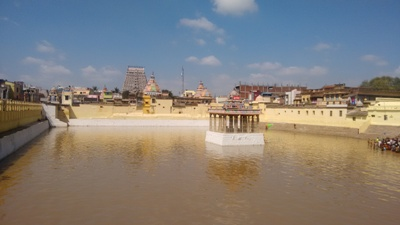

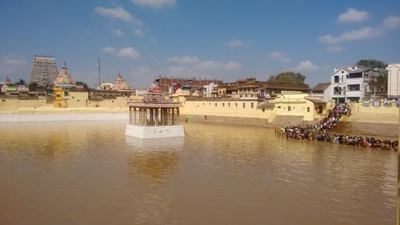

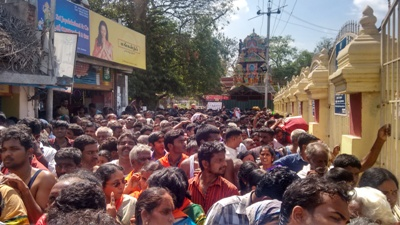

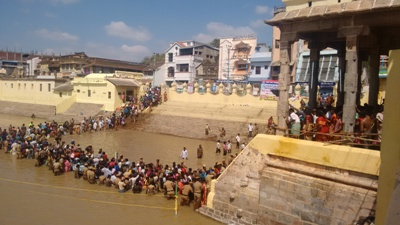

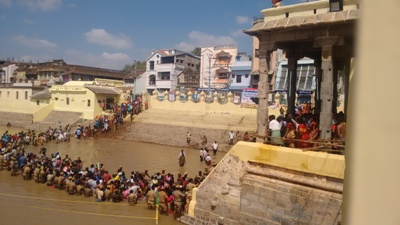
