= Draupati Amman Temples, Kumbakonam =

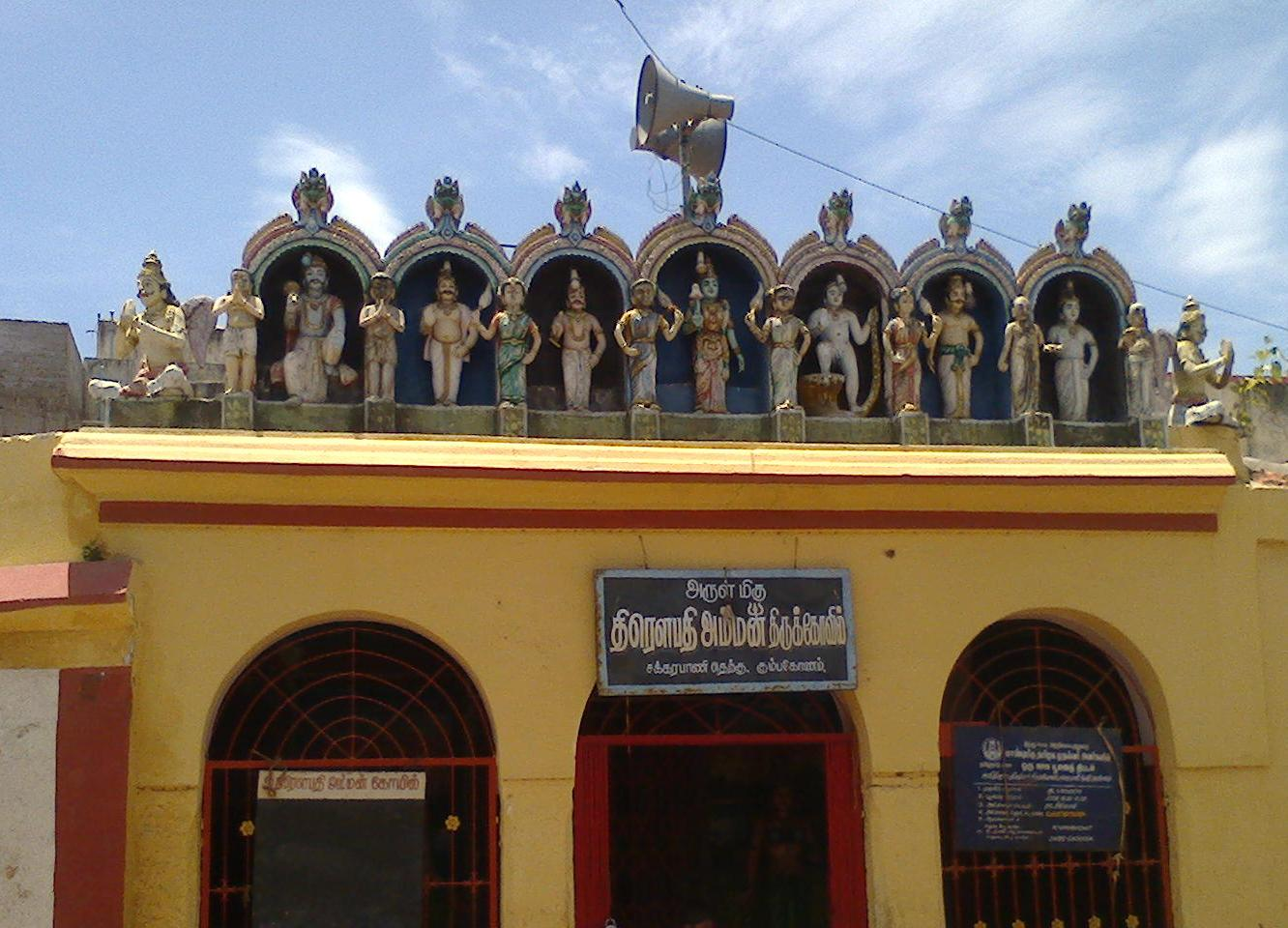
In the East Street of Chakrapani Temple

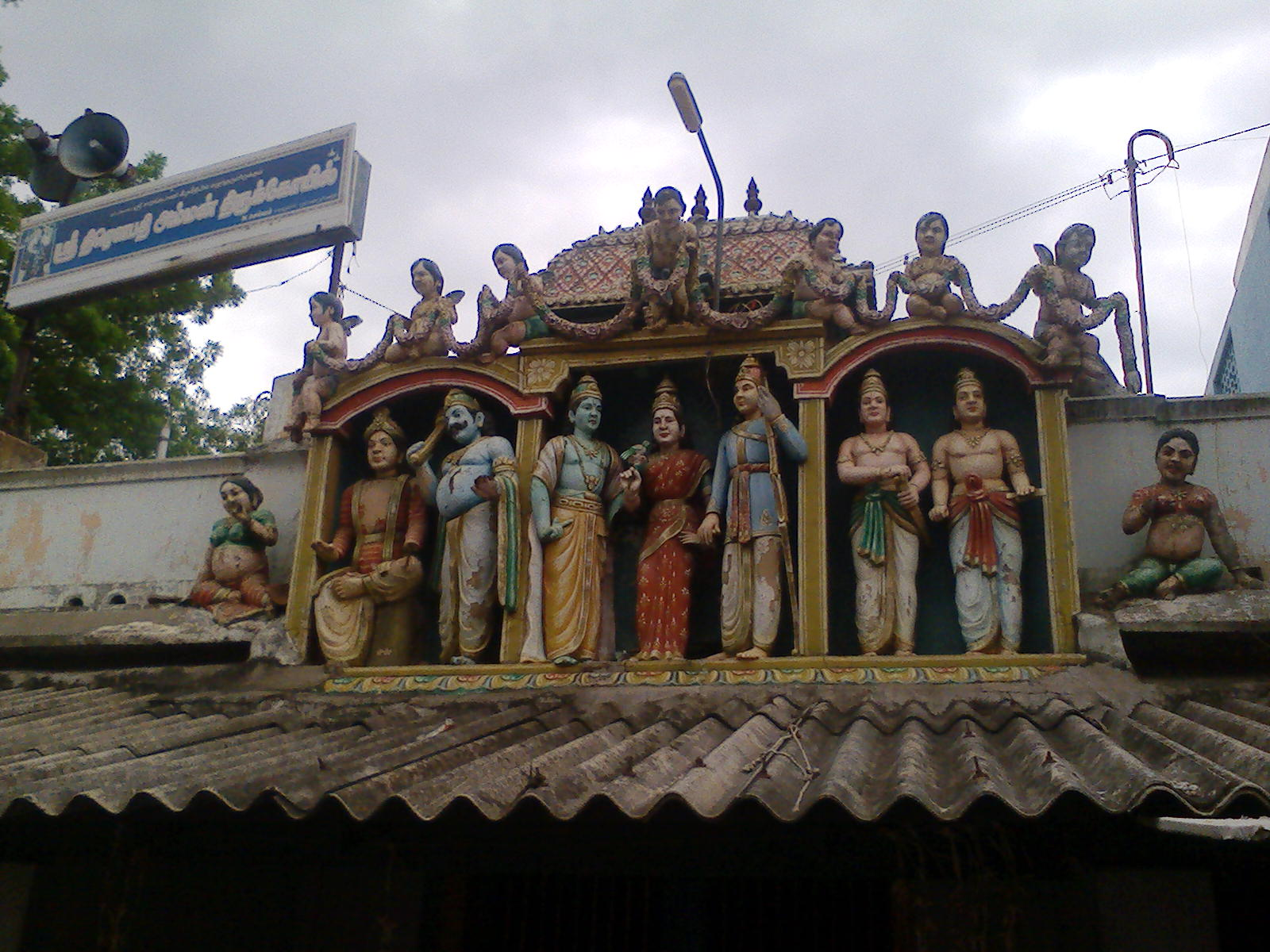
In the East Street of Sarangapani Temple

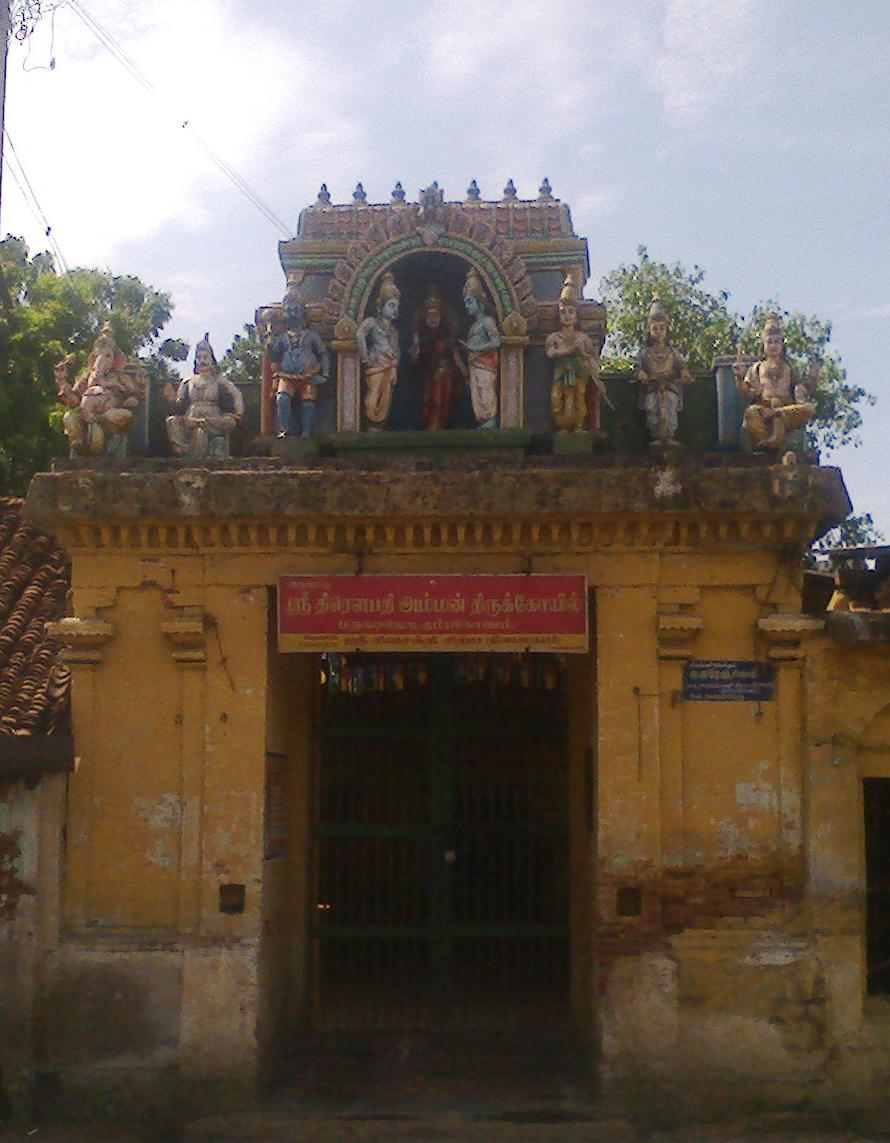
In Mathakdadi street

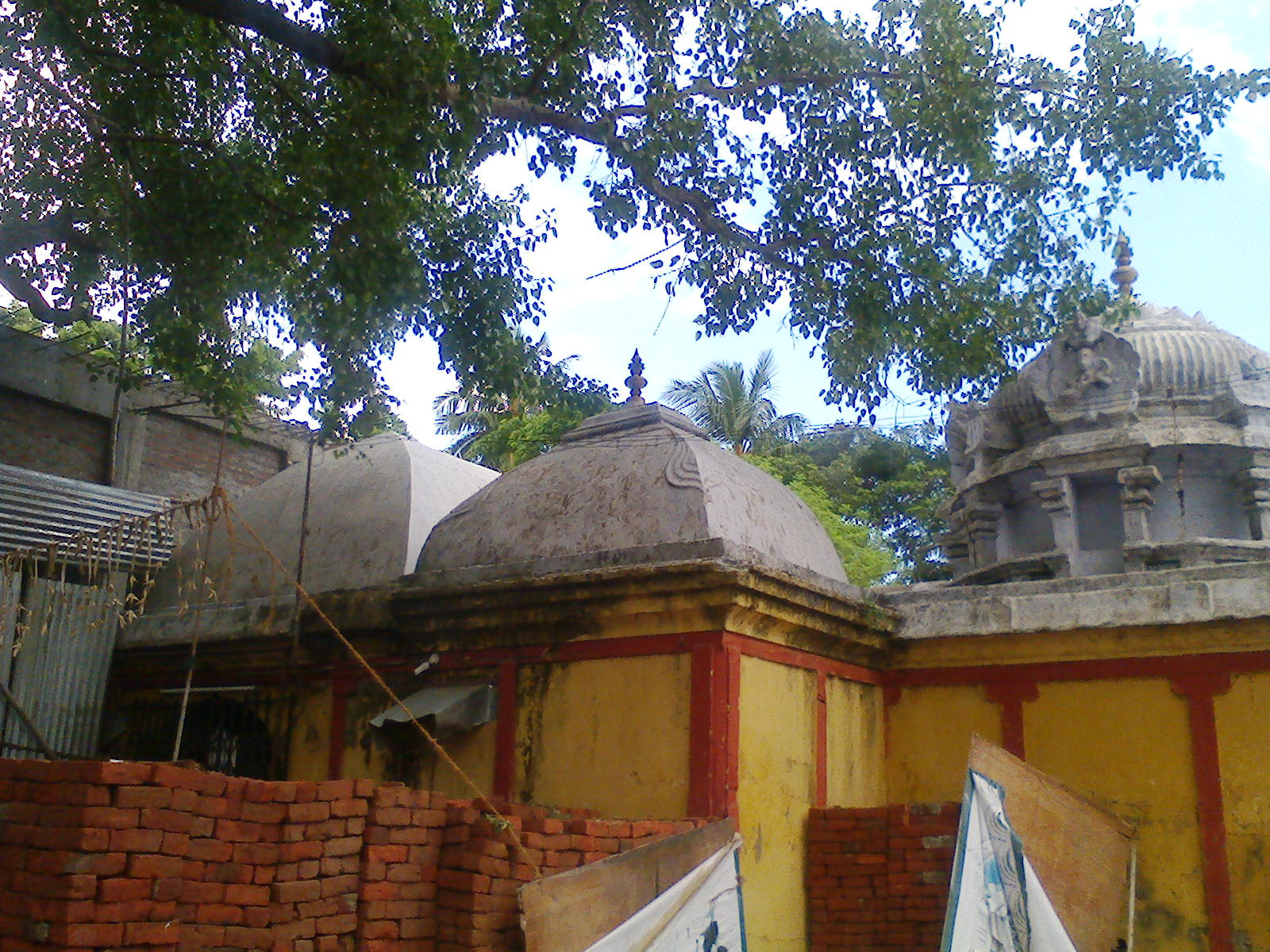
In Mathakdadi street

Draupati Amman Temples are the temples found in Kumbakonam in Thanjavur district, Tamil Nadu, India. In Kumbakonam, Draupati Amman temples are found among other places in the East Street of Chakrapani Temple, East Street of Sarangapani temple, Mathakdadi street and Hajiar street.

== Chakrapani Temple east ==
In the temple the presiding is Draupati Amman. A Vinayaka is found in the temple. Aravaan made of paper is also found in the temple. On 1 July 2005, (28, Tamil month of Chitrai, Parthipa), the Kumbhabhishekham of this temple was held.

== Sarangapani Temple east ==
As found in Chakrapani Temple East, a temple of Draupati Amman is found in Sarangapani Temple east, having he as the presiding deity. Two Kalis and Madurai Veeran are found in the left side of the shrine of the presiding deity. An inscription about the Kumbhabhishekham of this temple held on 23 August 2001, (7, Tamil month of Avani, Vishu) is found in the temple. Another Kumbhabhishekham was performed on 6 April 2015 here.

== Mathakdadi street ==
In Mathakdadi street of Kumbakonam, another Draupati Amman temple is found. The presiding deity Draupati and Vinayaka are found here. In a separate shrine the head of Aravaan is found. Kumbhabhishekham of this temple held on 26 October 2015.

== Hajiar street ==
In Hajiar street, near Kumbakonam bus stand, Draupati Amman temple is found. In this temple shrines of Draupati, Gayatri Kaliamman and Mariamman are found. A big head of Aravaan is found in this temple. Kumbhabhishekham of this temple held on 3 February 2016.
