= Varahaperumal Temple =

Hindu temple of the god Varaha in India

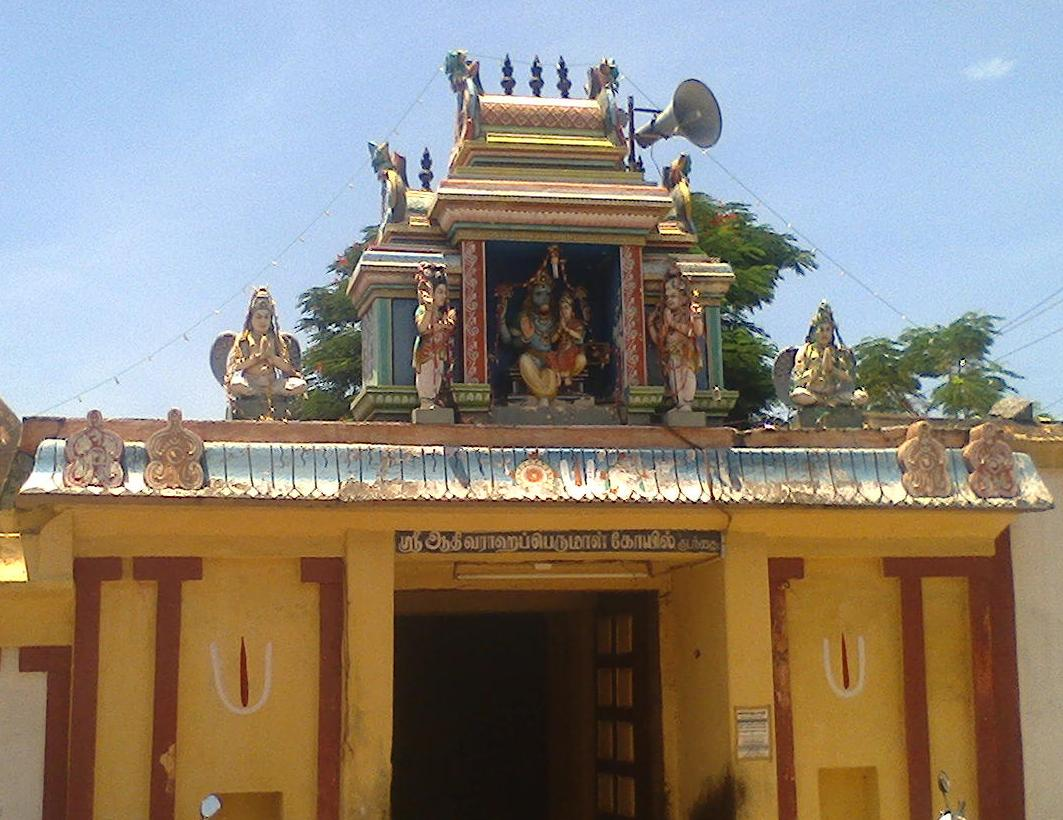
- Varahaperumal Temple, Kumbakonam

Religion
- Affiliation: Hinduism
- District: Thanjavur
- Deity: Varaha and Bhudevi

Location
- Location: Kumbakonam
- State: Tamil Nadu
- Country: India
- Interactive map of Varahaperumal Temple

Varahaperumal Temple is a Hindu temple dedicated to Varaha (the boar avatar of the god Vishnu) at Kumbakonam in Thanjavur district, Tamil Nadu, India.

== Presiding deity ==
The moolavar presiding deity, is found in his manifestation as Varahaperumal (Varaha). His consort is known as Bhoomidevi.

== Legend ==
Once a demon took the earth to the underground. Devas prayed to Vishnu to save the world. Vishnu fought with the demon in the form of Varaha - a boar and brought out the world from underground.

== Specialty ==
Five Vishnu temples are connected with Mahamaham festival which happens once in 12 years in Kumbakonam, the others being:

- Sarangapani Temple
- Chakrapani Temple
- Ramaswamy Temple
- Rajagopalaswamy Temple

== Garudasevai ==
Garudasevai is one of the main festivals of the temple.

== Mahasamprokshanam ==
The Mahasamprokshanam also known as Kumbabishegam of the temple was held on 26 October 2015.

== See also ==
- Mahamaham
- Mahamaham tank, Kumbakonam
- Hindu temples of Kumbakonam

== Mahasamprokshanam 26 October 2015 ==
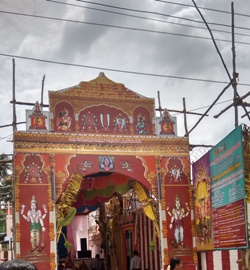

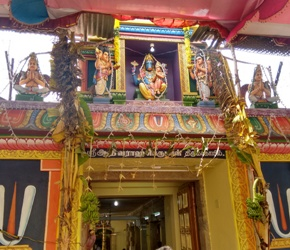

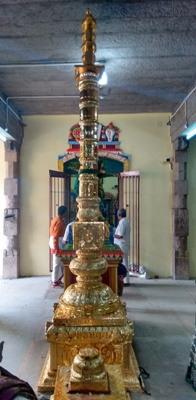

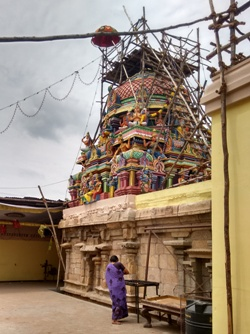

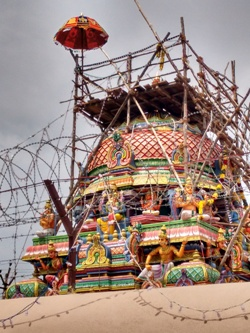

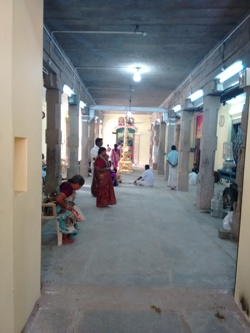
