= Rajagopalaswamy Temple, Kumbakonam =

Rajagopalaswamy Temple
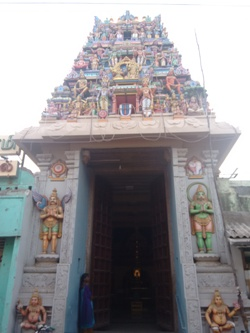
- Rajagopalaswamy Temple, Kumbakonam

Religion
- Affiliation: Hinduism
- District: Thanjavur
- Deity: Rajagopalaswamy.(Vishnu ) Sengamalavalli (goddess)

Location
- Location: Kumbakonam
- State: Tamil Nadu
- Country: India
- Interactive map of Rajagopalaswamy Temple
- Coordinates: 10°52′18″N 79°06′28″E

Rajagopalaswamy Temple is a Hindu temple dedicated to Vishnu located at Kumbakonam in Thanjavur district, Tamil Nadu, India.

== Presiding deity ==
The moolavar presiding deity, is found in his manifestation as Rajagopalaswamy. His consort is known as Sengamalavalli.

There is another temple in the same name at Thoppu Street in Kumbakonam.

== Specialty ==
Five Vishnu temples are connected with Mahamaham festival which happens once in 12 years in Kumbakonam. They are:

- Sarangapani Temple,
- Chakrapani Temple,
- Ramaswamy Temple,
- Rajagopalaswamy Temple, and
- Varahaperumal Temple.

This temple, one among them, is situated in the north of Big Street.

== Garudasevai ==
Garudasevai is one of the main festivals of the temple.

== Mahasamprokshanam ==
The Mahasamprokshanam also known as Kumbabishegam of the temple was held on 19 June 2015.

== The temple after Mahasamprokshnam (19 June 2015) ==
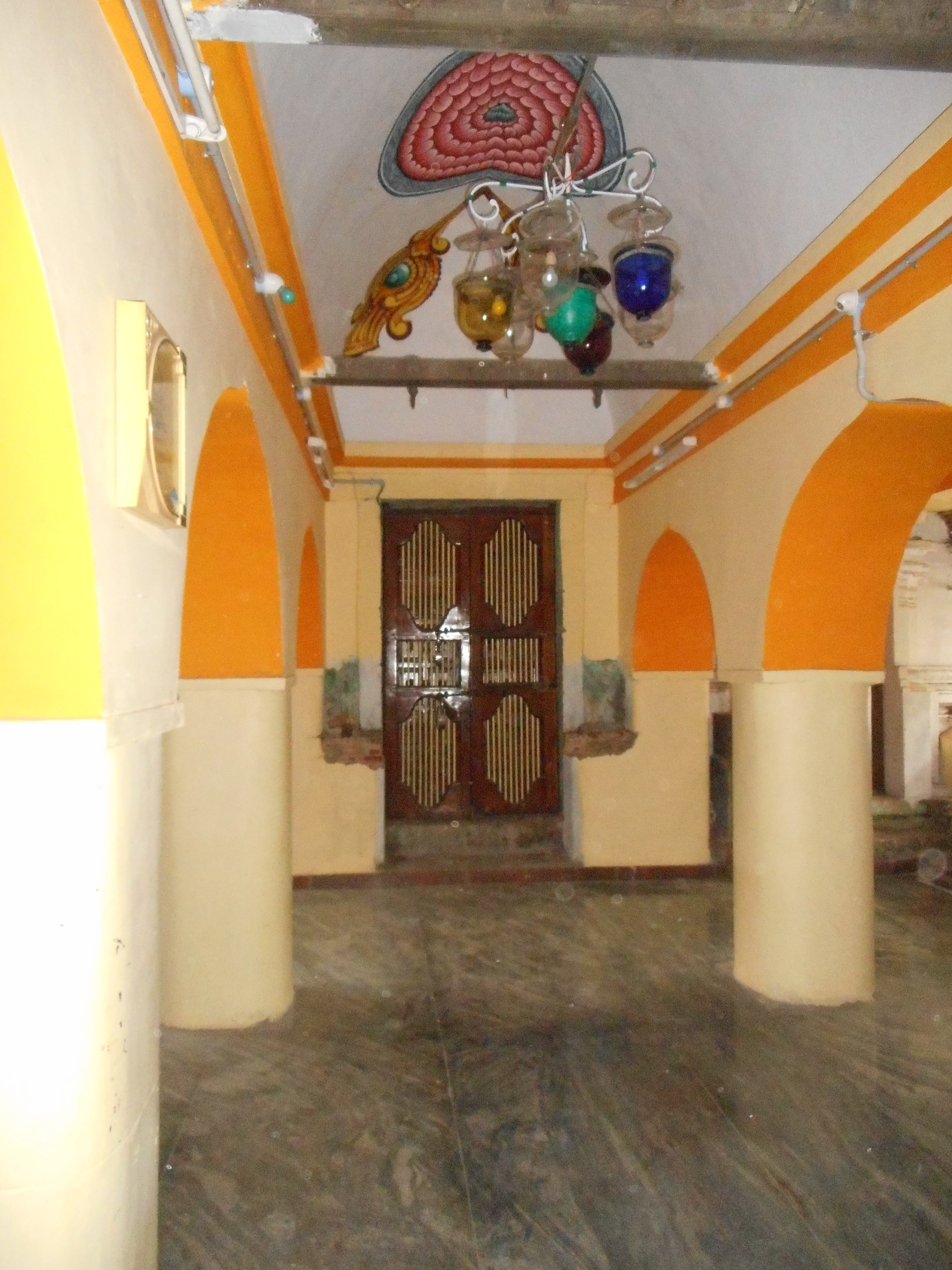

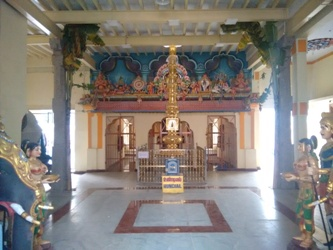

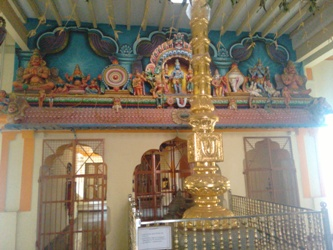

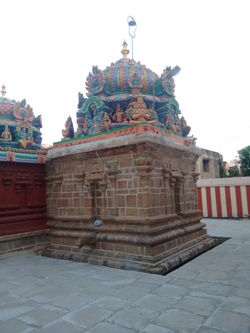

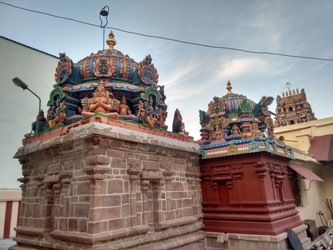

== See also ==
- Mahamaham
- Mahamaham tank, Kumbakonam
- Hindu temples of Kumbakonam
