= Chakrapani Temple =

Coordinates: 10.963351°N 79.373170°E

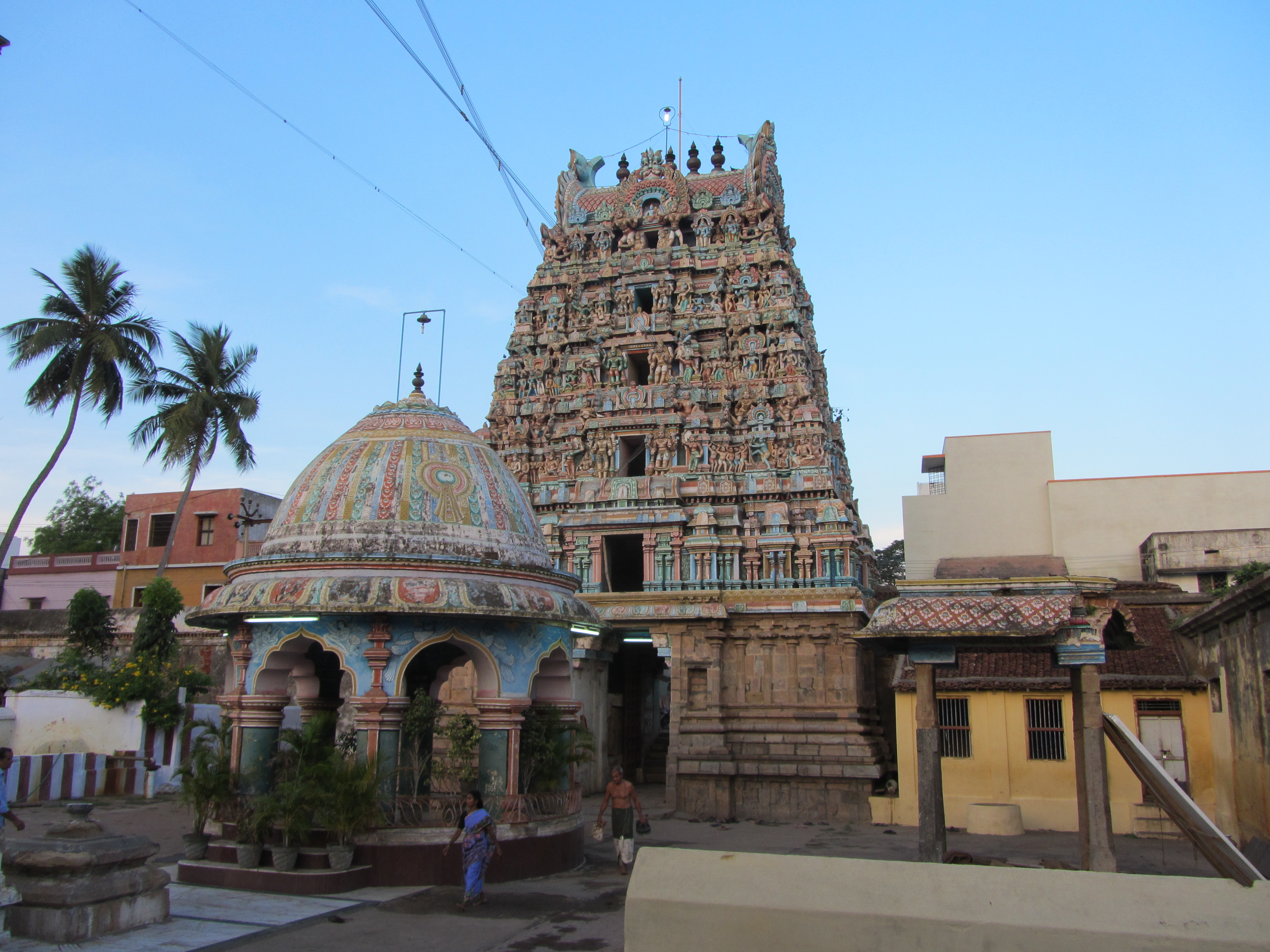
- Chakrapani Temple, Kumbakonam

Religion
- Affiliation: Hinduism
- District: Thanjavur
- Deity: Chakrapani(Vishnu ) Vijayalakshmi Thayar

Location
- Location: Kumbakonam
- State: Tamil Nadu
- Country: India
- Interactive map of Chakrapani Temple

Chakrapani Temple is a Hindu temple dedicated to God Vishnu located in Kumbakonam, Tamil Nadu, India. This temple is located 2 km, away towards North West from the Kumbakonam Railway Station. Vishnu appears in the form of a discus or Chakra to put down the pride of Surya (the Sun), who subsequently became his devotee. Like Shiva, Lord Chakrapani has a third eye on His forehead. The temple is one of the prominent Vishnu temples in Kumbakonam.

== Legend ==
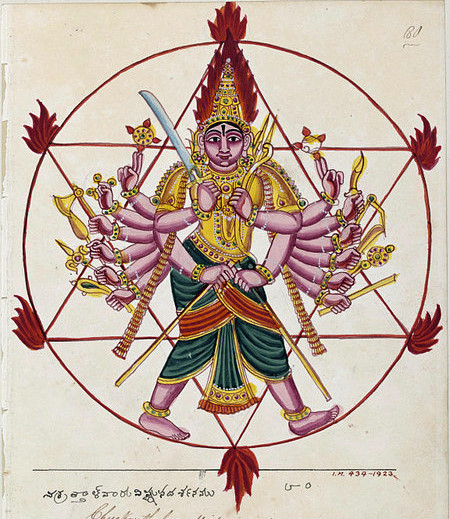
Chakrayuda Purusha, the image of the deity

As per Hindu legend, Chakra (also called Sudarshana), the discus, is the most powerful weapon of god Vishnu. He once sent his weapon to nether world to kill king Jalandasura. The weapon is believed to have come out of the nether world through river Kaveri. God Brahma, who was taking bath in the river, got impressed and installed the image of Sudarshana in the place where the temple is now located. Surya, the Sun god, who was glowing in brilliance, had his brightness diminished by the effulgent Sudarshana. Surya worshipped Sudarshana and pleased by his devotion, Sudarshana restored all the powers of Surya. Vishnu attained the name Chakrapani from then on. Surya wanted the town to be named after him and pleased by his devotion, Chakrapani named the city as Bhaskara Kshetra. It is believed that Surya worshiped Chakrathazhwar during Masi Magam and every year Masi Magam festival is celebrated during the day, commemorating the event. The temple car is drawn around the streets of the temple during the day.

As per another legend, during the great deluge, the pot of nectar came down swirling. The pot of nectar fell down into different pieces as Shiva shot his arrow at the pot. The nectar is believed to have relieved lives in the planet. As per Sarma Sastrigal, the various places where the nectar spilled are Kumbeswara Temple, Sarangapani Temple, Chakrapani Temple, Nageswaran Temple, Someswaran Temple, Abhimukeswarar Temple, Kasi Viswanathar Temple, Kumbakonam, Kambatta Viswanathar, Gauthameswarar Temple, Banapuriswarar Temple, Varaha Perumal temple, Lakshminarayana and Varadaraja.

== History ==
The origins of the Chakrapani temple are obscure due to the lack of sufficient inscriptional evidence. However, based on the temple's architecture and motifs, scholars believe it to have been built in the 15th century under Nayaka rule. The temple was one of the three significant Vaishnava temples in Kumbakonam that received patronage during the Nayaka era, the others being the Ramaswamy Temple and the Sarangapani Temple. A religious head began to handle the temple's administrative affairs in the 16th century. In 1620, when Govinda Dikshitar, divan-administrator for the Nayaks, constructed the Ramaswamy Temple, he added a commercial corridor between the new temple and the older Chakrapani temple.

== Architecture ==
The temple has granite walls enclosing all the shrines and pierced by a five-tiered rajagopuram, the gateway tower. The temple is noted for its exquisite pillars. The presiding deity, Chakrapani is sported with eight arms, each having a weapon and is housed in the central shrine in an elevated structure. Chakrapani is sported with a third eye on his forehead. The Eastern and Western entrances of this temple are known as "Thatchinaya Vayil" and "Utharavana Vayil" respectively and outer Prakara of this temple is made in the form of balcony. There is a bronze image of king Serfoji II worshipping the lord as he is said to have been cured an illness by the grace of this God. A panchamukha (five-faced) Hanuman is erected in the prakaram (outer precincts of the temple). Agampara Vinayakar, Panchamuga Aancheneyar and Vijayavalli are the important idols located in this temple.

== Festivals and religious practices ==
The temple is counted as one of the temples built on the banks of River Kaveri. Chakra Padithurai is a famous ghat in Kumbakonam parallel to the shrine of the temple situated across the river Cauvery. Neivethanam (sacred offering) performed every day for the deity is dependent on the smoke emanating from the burning of corpses from the ghat. It is pertinent to an ideology that God performs the chakra (cycle) of life and death. The important and peculiar point about this temple is that Vilva (Bilwa) archana which is normally performed in Shiva temples is also performed here for the Perumal.

Five Vishnu temples are connected with Mahamaham festival which happens once in 12 years in Kumbakonam. They are:

- Sarangapani Temple,
- Chakrapani Temple,
- Ramaswamy Temple,
- Rajagopalaswamy Temple, and
- Varahaperumal Temple.

This temple, one among them, is situated in the north of Big Street.

The Mahasamprokshanam also known as Kumbabishegam of the temple was held on 8 November 2015.

== See also ==
- Mahamaham tank, Kumbakonam
- Hindu temples of Kumbakonam

== Photogallery ==
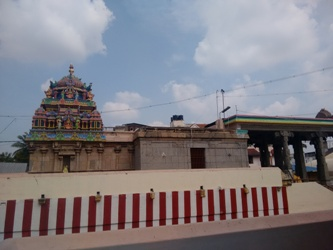

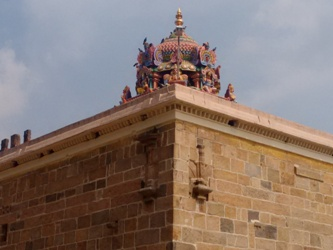

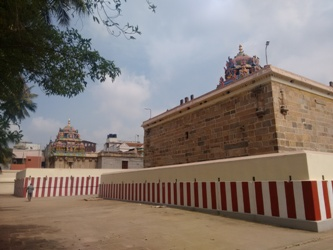

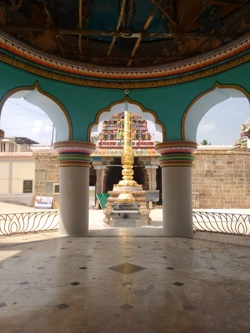

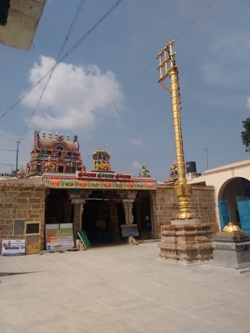

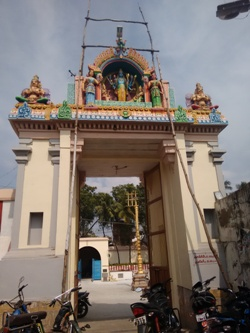

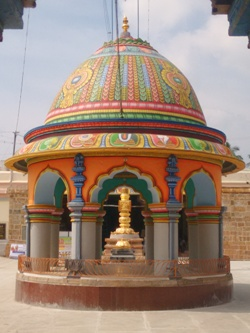
