= Someswarar Temple =

Shiva temple in Thanjavur district, Tamil Nadu, India

- Kudanthai Karonam
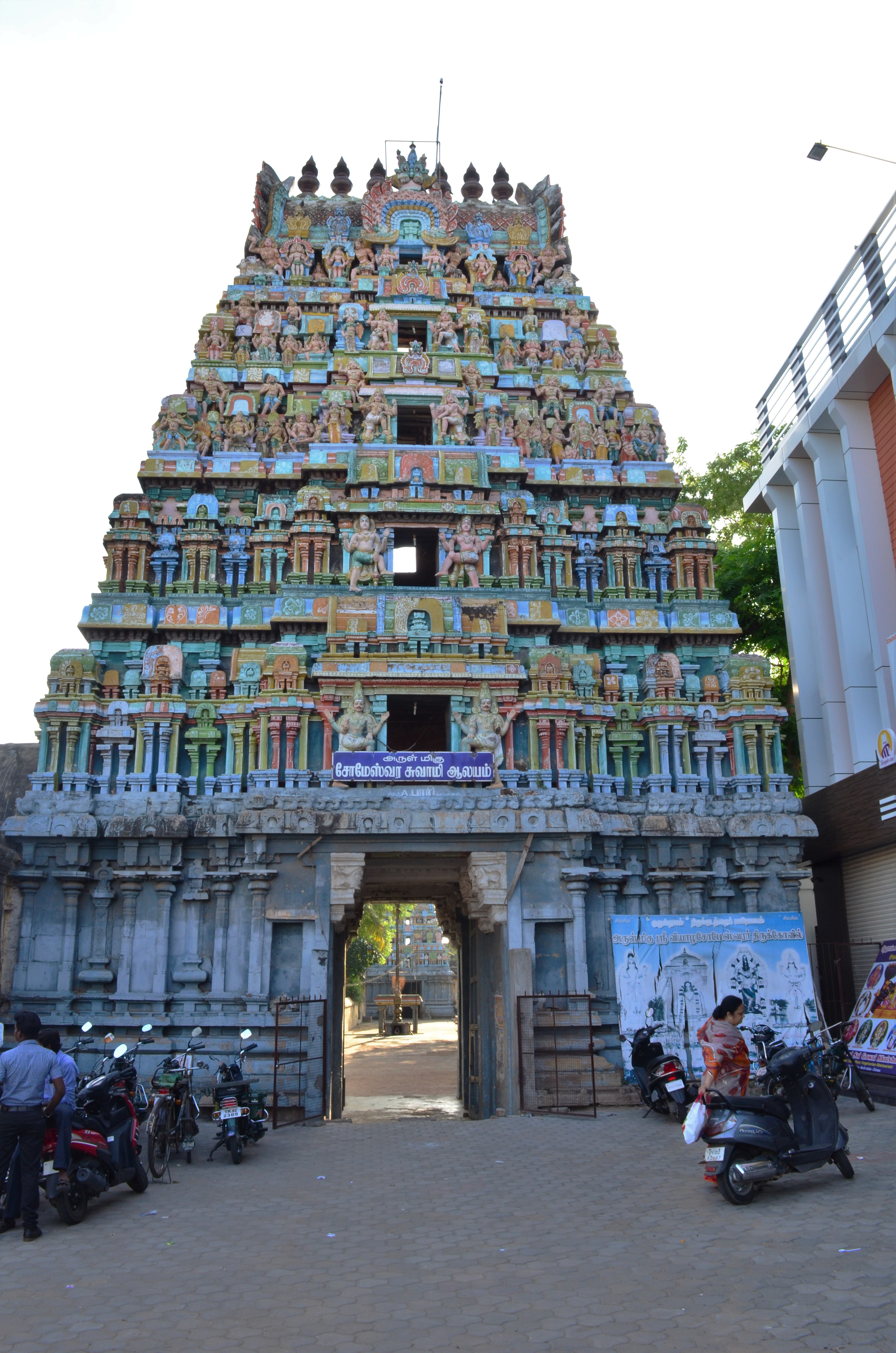
- Temple's Rajagopuram

- Location in Tamil Nadu

Religion
- Affiliation: Hinduism
- District: Thanjavur
- Deity: Someswarar (Shiva)
- Festival: Maha Shivaratri

Location
- Location: Kumbakonam
- State: Tamil Nadu
- Country: India
- Coordinates: 10.9591°N 79.3751°E

Architecture
- Type: Dravidian architecture
- Elevation: 54.41 m (179 ft)

Someswarar Temple is a Hindu temple dedicated to the deity Shiva in Kumbakonam, Tamil Nadu, India. Shiva is worshipped as Someswarar and is represented by the lingam. His consort Parvati is depicted as Somasundari. The presiding deity is revered in the 7th century Tamil Saiva canonical work, the Tevaram, written by Tamil saint poets known as the nayanars and classified as Paadal Petra Sthalam.

The temple complex covers two acres and is located close to the Sarangapani temple. It houses two gateway towers known as gopurams. The tallest is the western tower, with five stories and a height of 72 feet (22 m). The temple has numerous shrines, with those of Someswarar, Somasundari and being the most prominent.

The masonry structure was built during the Nayak during the 16th century. In modern times, the temple is maintained and administered by the Hindu Religious and Charitable Endowments Department of the Government of Tamil Nadu.

== Legend ==
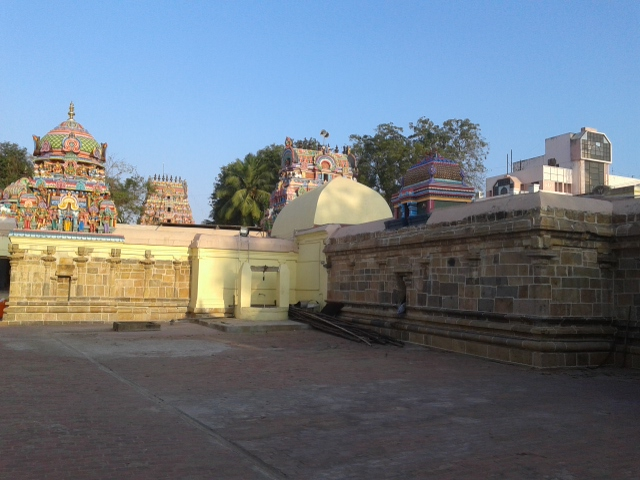
Shrines within the temple

This place has been referred to in thevaram written by Saint Poet (7th Century CE) Thirugnana Sambanthar and Thirunavukkarasar.

== Architecture ==
Someswarar Temple is situated in the southern portion of Sri Sarangapani temple. Legend is that the temple shared a larger space during initial construction, but later Sarangapani Temple adjacent to it occupied more space. The temple is one of the prominent Shiva temples in Kumbakonam. The temple is counted as one of the temples built on the banks of River Kaveri. The temple has a five tiered rajagopuram and the inner gopuram is three tiered. All the shrines of the temple are located inside the concentric walls of the temple. The sanctum is axial to the entrance tower facing east. The shrine of Mangalambigai is located in the hall leading to the sanctum and faces south. The shrine of Ambal faces the southern entrance of the temple located on the Thanjavur - Kumbakonam main road. The precinct around the sanctum has images of Vinayaka, Arumuga with Valli, Gajalakshmi and Nataraja. There was a contention between this temple and the Kasi Viswanathar Temple, Kumbakonam on which one is the temple mentioned as Kudanthai Karonam. Dharmapuram Adheenam, a Saiva monastic institution and some historians believed it to be the Kasi Viswanathar temple, while a convention in 1958 decided that it was Kudanthai Karonam. The songs mentioned in the Tevaram relevant to the temple were sculpted in the temple.

The temple is one of those built on the banks of River Kaveri. It was consecrated on 2 November 2015.

== Gallery ==
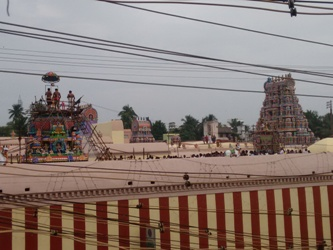
Kumbhabhishekham 2 November 2015

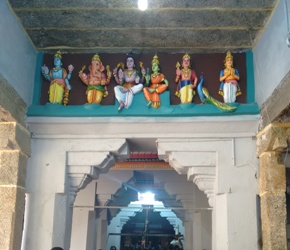

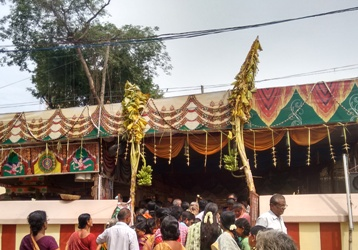

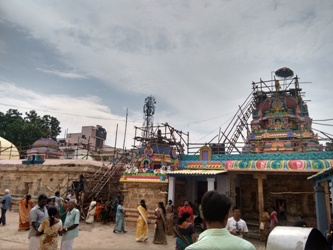

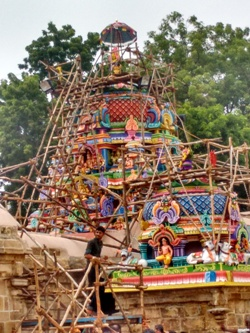

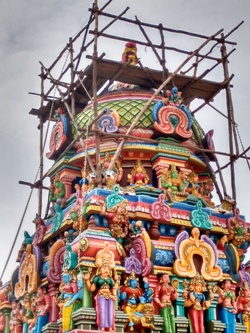

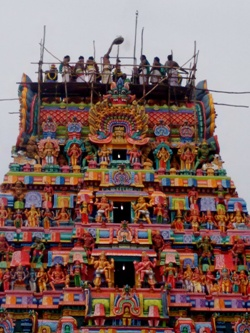
