= Sarangapani Temple =

Vishnu temple in Kumbakonam

Sharngapani Temple (shArngapANi temple)
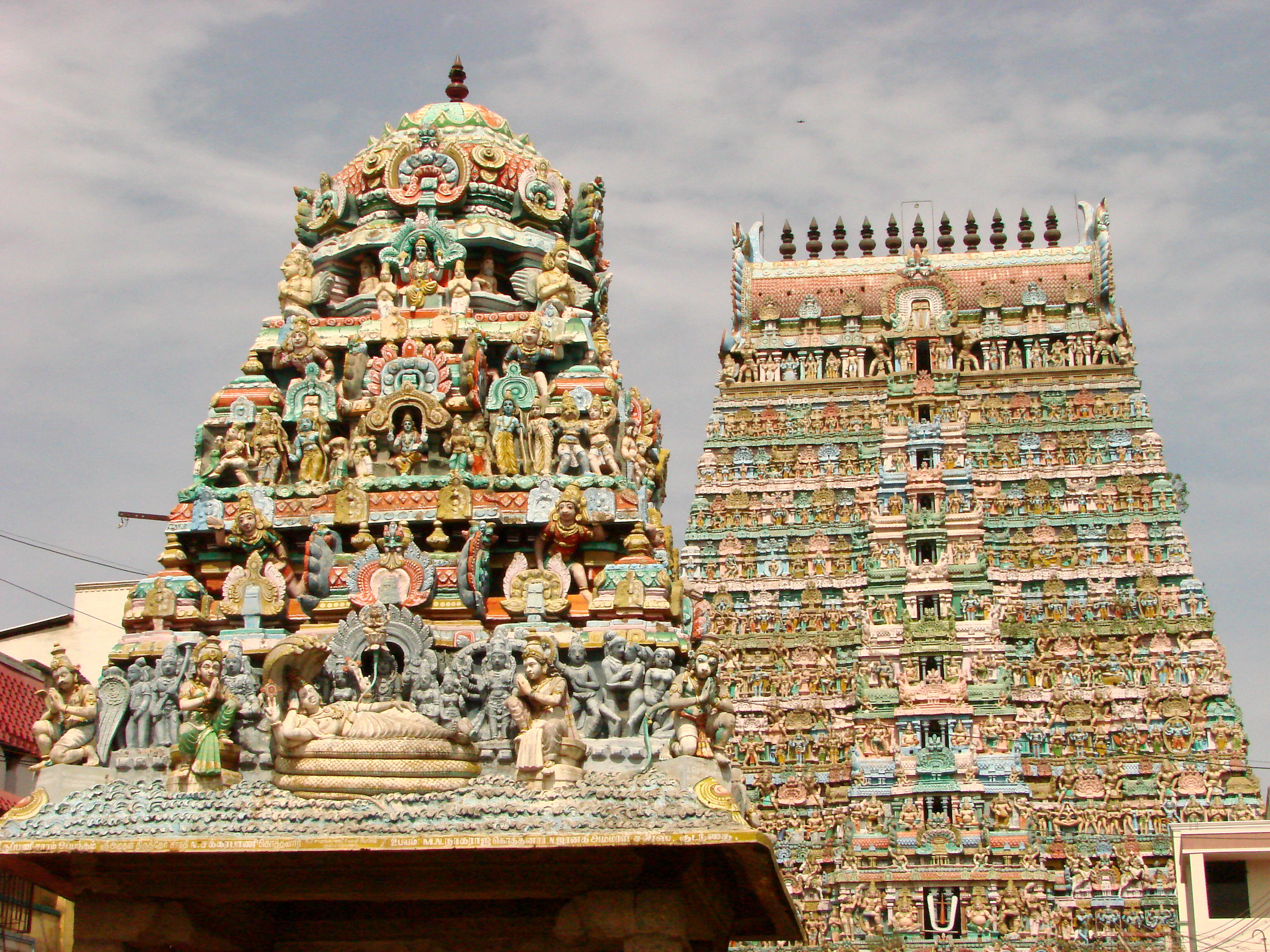

- Location within Tamil Nadu

Religion
- Affiliation: Hinduism
- District: Thanjavur
- Deity: Sharngapani, as Aravamuthar (Vishnu); Komalavalli Thayar (Lakshmi)

Location
- Location: Kumbakonam
- State: Tamil Nadu
- Country: India
- Coordinates: 10°57′34″N 79°22′29″E

Architecture
- Type: Dravidian architecture
- Creator: Cholas

The Sharngapani Temple, also known as Thirukudanthai or Kumbakonam koyil, is a Hindu temple dedicated to Vishnu, located in Kumbakonam, Tamil Nadu, India. It is one of the Divya Desams, the 108 temples of Vishnu revered in Nalayira Divya Prabandham by the 12 poet-saints, or Alvars. Situated along the Kaveri river, it is counted among the Pancharanga Kshetrams.

The temple is one of the Pancha Kshethram sites, associated with the legend where the goddess Lakshmi was born as Bhargavi, the daughter of Maharishi Bhrigu. The other four temples forming the Pancha Kshethram are the Sundararaja Perumal Temple in Salem, Oppiliappan Temple, Nachiyar Koil and the Venkateswara Temple in Tirumala.

The temple is believed to be of significant antiquity with contributions at different times from Medieval Cholas, Vijayanagara Empire and Madurai Nayaks. The temple is enshrined within a huge granite wall and the complex contains all the shrines and the water bodies of the temple. The rajagopuram (the main gateway) has eleven tiers and has a height of 173 ft (53 m). The Potramarai tank, the temple tank, is located opposite to the western entrance of the temple.

Sharngapani is believed to have appeared for sage Hemarishi. The temple chariot festival is the most prominent festival of the temple, celebrated during the Tamil month of Chittirai (March–April). The twin temple chariots are the tallest in Tamil Nadu, the base of each weighing 300 t (660,000 lb), while the total structure, with the wheels, weighing around 500 tonnes (around 1,100,000 lb).

== Legend ==
As per Hindu legend, the Vaishnava deity, Sharngapani, an incarnation of the Hindu god Vishnu, appeared for a sage Hemarishi, who performed penance in the bank of Potramarai tank. Sage Bhrigu wanted To decide who was the supreme amongst the trimurthis- Brahma, Vishnu, Shiva. Having been to Brahma who ignored him, going to Shiva who did not notice him and finally Lord Narayana. Lord Narayana knew very well he was coming. Once, sage Bhrigu wanted to meet Vishnu at his residence, the Ocean of Milk. The sage did not get the attention of Vishnu who notices him but deliberately ignored him. In his anger, he kicked Vishnu on his chest. He begs Lord Narayana for forgiveness and declares Lord Narayana as the supreme lord. Lakshmi, who resides in Vishnu's chest, got angered as Vishnu did not show his anger towards the sage. She left Vaikuntha and reached earth and took the form of Padmavati. Vishnu followed her and married her. Padmavati got her memories and was still angry with Vishnu. To avoid her anger, Vishnu resided in the underground chamber in the temple as Pathala Srinivasa. In the meanwhile, the sage Bhrigu sought his apology and requested Lakshmi to be born to him as Komalavalli in his next birth. The sage was born as Hemarishi and performed penance to attain Lakshmi as his daughter. Vishnu was pleased by the penance and he wished the sage to get Lakshmi as his daughter. Lakshmi emerged from the Potramarai tank among thousand lotuses and was thus named Komalavalli (the one who emerged from lotus). Vishnu descended to earth as Aravamudhan in a chariot drawn by horses and elephants from his abode Vaikuntha. He stayed in the nearby Someswaran Temple to convince Lakshmi to marry him and the couple eventually got married. The name Sharngapani ("one who has the bow in his hand") derives from the Sanskrit word Sharanga, the bow of Vishnu, and pani meaning hand.

== History ==
The site of the Sharngapani Temple may have been a Vaishnava settlement as early as the 7th or 8th century. Oral traditions dating to the early Chola period reference the temple. The earliest epigraphical evidence of the temple dates to the late Chola period (10th-12th centuries). The temple became significant under the Vijayanagara and Nayaka rulers (15-17th centuries), who expanded its structure; their patronage represented a shift from the Cholas' interest in sponsoring Shaivite temples in Kumbakonam. The temple was one of the three main Vaishnava temples of Kumbakonam in this period, the others being the newer Ramaswamy Temple and Chakrapani Temple. Due to reconstruction in the Chola and Vijayanagara eras, the original shrine is no longer extant. During Nayaka rule in the 17th century, a Vaishnava matha (monastic institution) became associated with the temple.

The Mahasamprokshanam also known as kumbhabhishekam of the temple was held on 13 July 2015. A large number of devotees took part in the Mahasamprokshanam.

The temple is maintained and administered by the Hindu Religious and Charitable Endowments Department of the Government of Tamil Nadu.

== Architecture ==
Sharngapani is the largest Vishnu temple in Kumbakonam and has the tallest temple tower in the town. The temple is enshrined within a huge wall and the complex enshrines all the water bodies of the temple except the Potramarai tank. The rajagopuram (the main gateway) has eleven tiers and has a height of 173 ft (53 m). There are five other smaller gopurams in the temple. The rajagopuram has figures depicting various religious stories. The temple faces east and the Potramarai tank is located outside the western entrance. The central shrine of the temple is in the form of a chariot drawn by horses and elephants, with openings on either side, showing the descent of Sharngapani from heaven in the chariot. Similar architecture of halls (Mandapas) simulating a chariot drawn by elephant or horses is found in Mela Kadambur Amirthakadeswarar Temple, Sikharagiriswara Temple, Kudumiyamalai, Nageswaraswamy Temple, Kumbakonam, Vriddhagiriswarar Temple, Vriddhachalam and Thyagaraja Temple, Tiruvarur. There is a sculptural representation of the sage Hemarishi in the western part of the temple. The central shrine, the sanctum is approached via a 100-pillared hall. The inner sanctum in the form of a chariot is guarded by Dwaraplakas facing the outer entrance. From the outer entrance, there is a perforated window axial to the sanctum. The central shrine of the temple houses the image of Sharngapani in pallikonda posture, with his head resting on his right hand. There are other images of sage Hemarishi, Lakshmi and festival images enshrined within the sanctum. There are two stepped entrances to the sanctum named as Utharayana Vaasal and Dhakshanayana Vaasal, each open for a six-month period. From 15 January to 15 July, Utharayanya Vaasal is opened while Dhakshanaya Vaasal is opened during the other half of the year. The Potramarai tank has a central hall called Hemarishi Mandapam. The temple has two processional chariots carved out of wood stationed outside the rajagopuram. It is classified as Karakkoil, a temple fashioned after temple chariots which are taken in procession around the temple during festivals. The shrine of Komalavalli Thayar is located in the northern part of the temple in a shrine parallel to the sanctum.

In Bharatanatyam, a South Indian dance form, 108 karanas form the basic movements. Some of these karanas are sculpted around the walls of the temple. Similar sculptures are found in the Brihadeeswarar Temple in Thanjavur and Nataraja Temple in Chidambaram.

== Religious significance ==
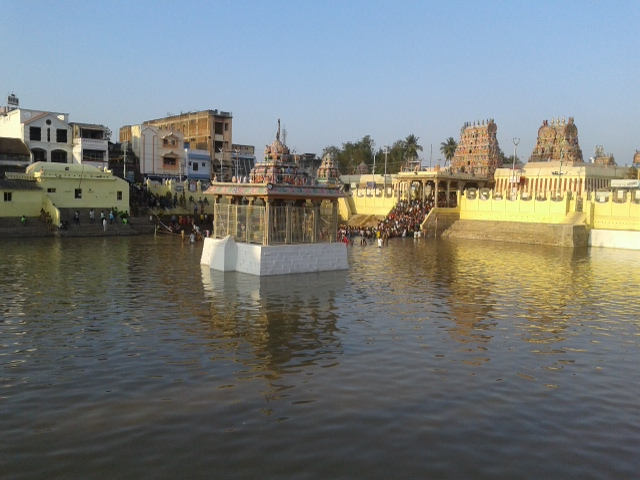
View of the temple from the Potramarai tank

The temple is revered in Divya Prabandham, the 7th–9th century Vaishnava canon, by Andal in one, Periyalvar in three, Bhuthath Alvar in two, Tirumalisai Alvar in seven, Peialvar in two, Nammalvar in eleven and Thirumangai Alvar in 25 verses. The temple is classified as a divyadesam, the 108 Vishnu temples that are revered in the Vaishnava canon. As per a Hindu legend, Nathamuni, who compiled Divya Prabandham by the twelve alvars, found only the first ten verses sung on Aravamudhan. Nammalvar recited the remaining 3990 verses unconsciously while he was in deep meditation and Nathamuni compiled all of them.

The temple is counted as one of the temples built on the banks of River Kaveri. Pancharanga Kshetrams (also called Pancharangams, meaning the "five Rangams or Ranganathas") is a group of five sacred Hindu temples, dedicated to Ranganatha, a form of the god Vishnu, on the banks of the Kaveri River. The five Pancharanga Kshetrams in the order of their successive locations, on the banks of the Kaveri River are: The Srirangapatnam called the Adi Ranga, the first temple on the banks of the Kaveri River from the upstream side; the Srirangam (island in Tiruchirappalli) in Tamil Nadu known as Adya Ranga (the last temple), Appalarangam or Koviladi at Tiurppernagar in Tamil Nadu, Parimala Ranganatha Perumal Temple or Mayuram at Indalur, Mayiladuthurai and Vatarangam at Sirkazhi. The Sarangapani temple at Kumbakonam is mentioned in place of Vatarangam in some references.

Five Vishnu temples are connected with Mahamaham festival which happens once in 12 years in Kumbakonam - Sharngapani Temple, Chakrapani Temple, Ramaswamy Temple, Rajagopalaswamy Temple, and Varahaperumal Temple.

== Religious importance ==
Five Vishnu temples are connected with Mahamaham festival which happens once in 12 years in Kumbakonam. They are Sharngapani Temple, Chakrapani Temple, Ramaswamy Temple, Rajagopalaswamy Temple and Varahaperumal Temple. This temple, one among them, is situated in the north of Big Street.

As per a temple legend, once a staunch Brahmin devotee of Aravamudhan spent most of his life to the service of the deity. At the end of his life, he felt his loneliness and prayed for his karma to be performed. Aravamudhan descended himself to perform the last rites on a Deepavali day. The ritual is performed annually by the priests and is one of its kind where death rituals are performed in the precincts of a Vishnu temple.

The temple is called Ubaya Pradhana Kshetram as the mulavar (presiding deity) and utsavar (festive deity) enjoy the same importance. As per legend, Tirumalisai Alvar was singing praise of Aravamudan and he requested him to raise up from his reclining position. Aramudan started raising to gargantuan proportion forcing Thirumalisai Alvar to request him to recline again. The idol stopped midway and the current posture, Uthana Sayi was established. It is believed that the presiding deity asked Nathamuni to compile the four thousand verses of Nalayira Divya Prabandham at this place.

== Temple chariot ==
The twin temple chariots weigh 300 t (660,000 lb) each and has been renovated in 2007. The chariots were not drawn for some years during the preceding period. The chariots are next only in size to the ones in Thygaraja temple in Thiruvarur and Andal Temple in Srivilliputhur. The chariots are pulled by hundreds of devotees across the streets around the temple twice a year, once during the Brahmotsavam during April–May and other during Ratha saptami in January–February. The festival idols of Sharngapani and Komalvalli are brought to the thermutti (chariot station) after elaborate religious rituals.

Thirumangai Alvar's Tiruvelukkutrirukkai, a single verse in 46 lines, when seen in numerical order, makes the image of a temple chariot. The painting depicting the verse in the chariot form is seen in the temple. It is believed that the first temple chariot of the temple was instituted by Thirumangai Alvar himself.

== Gallery ==
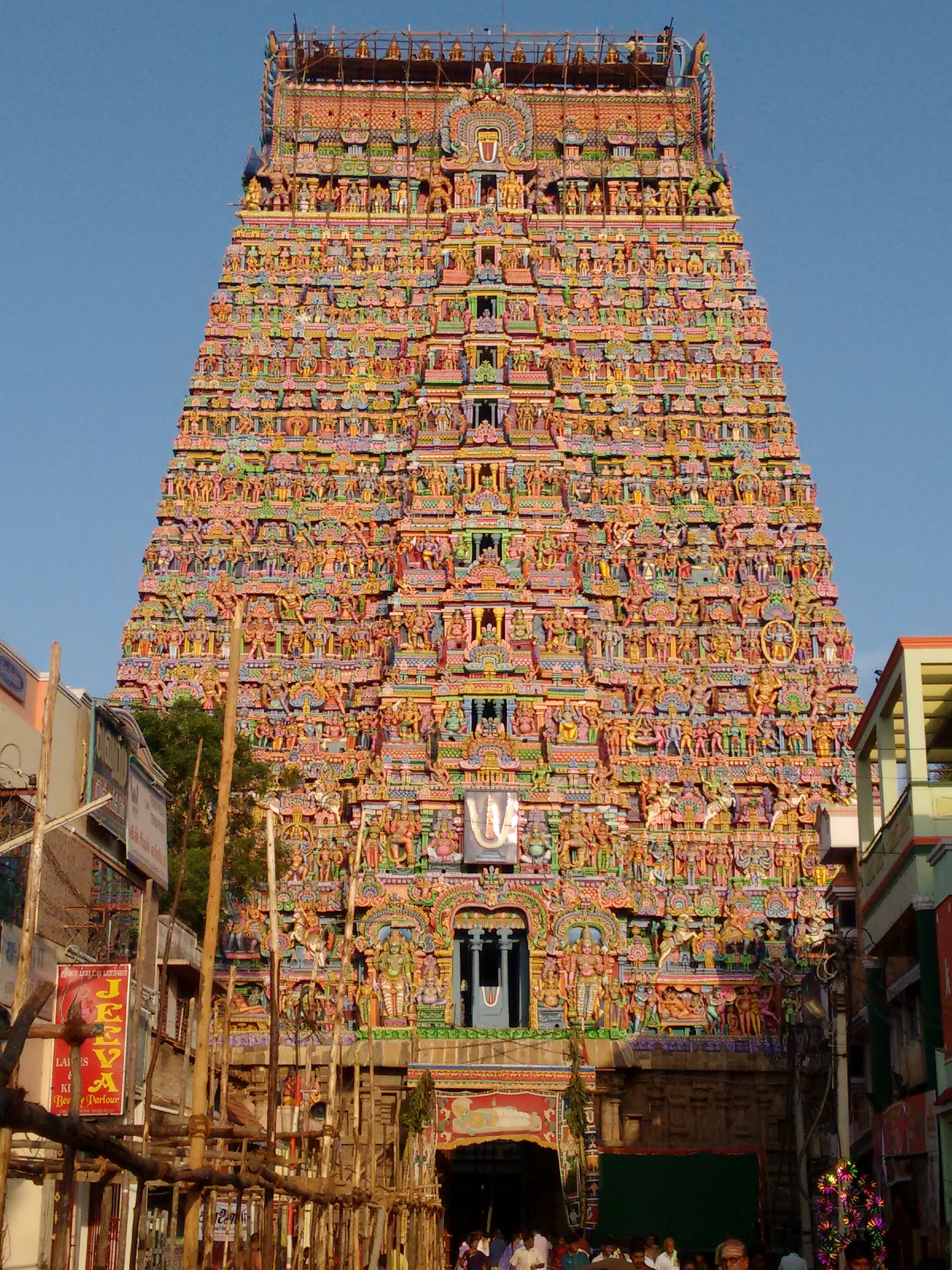

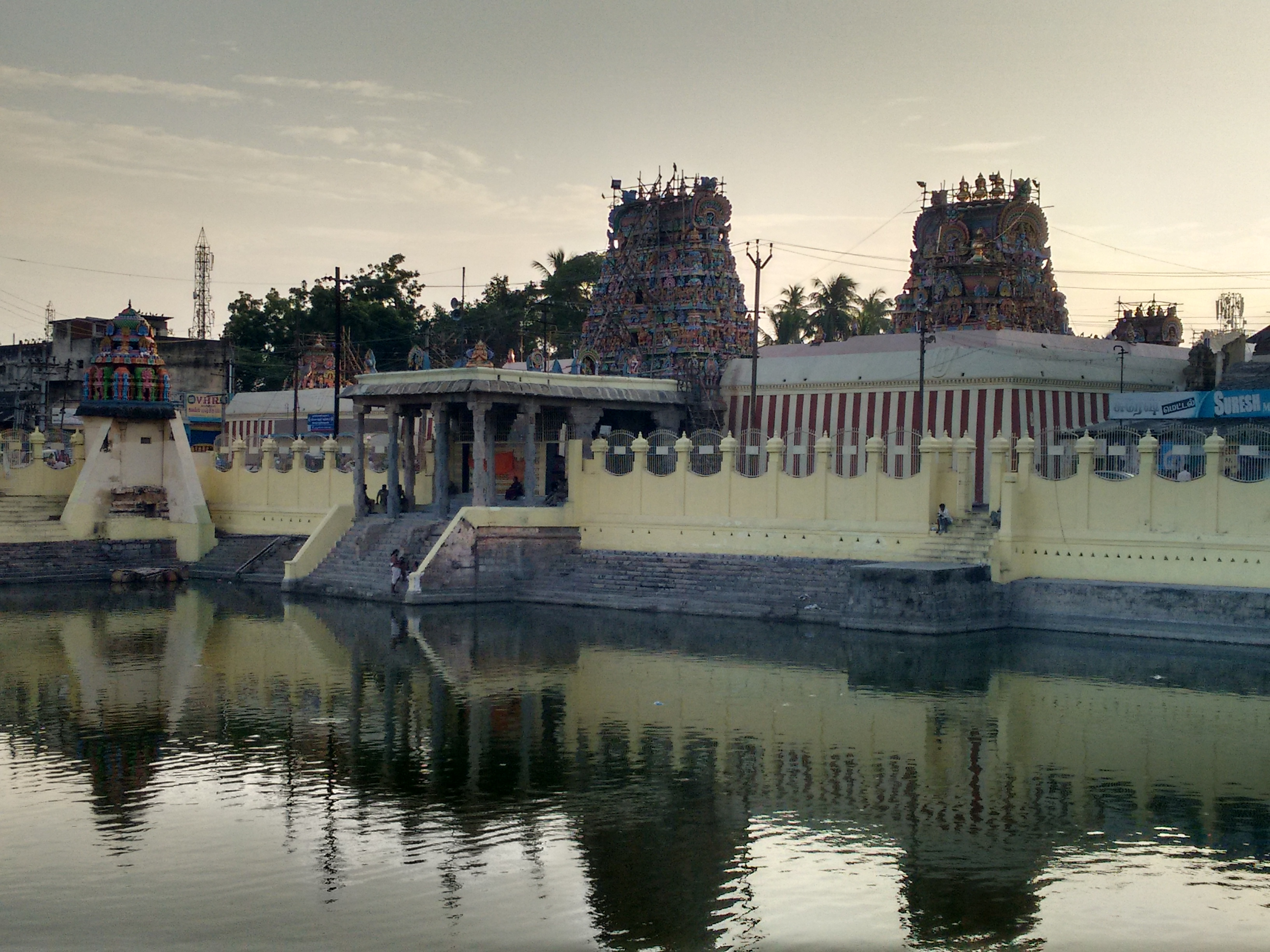

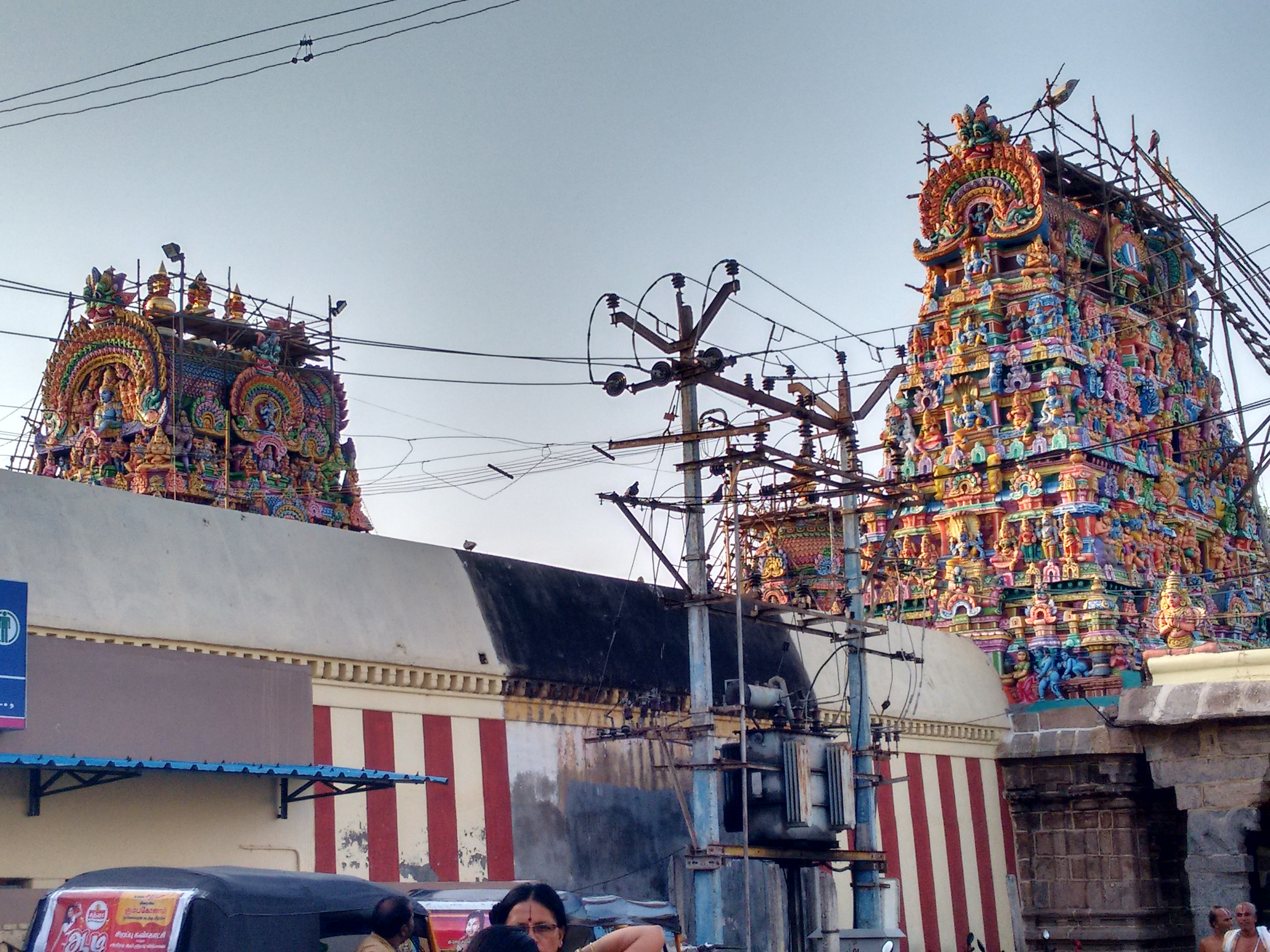

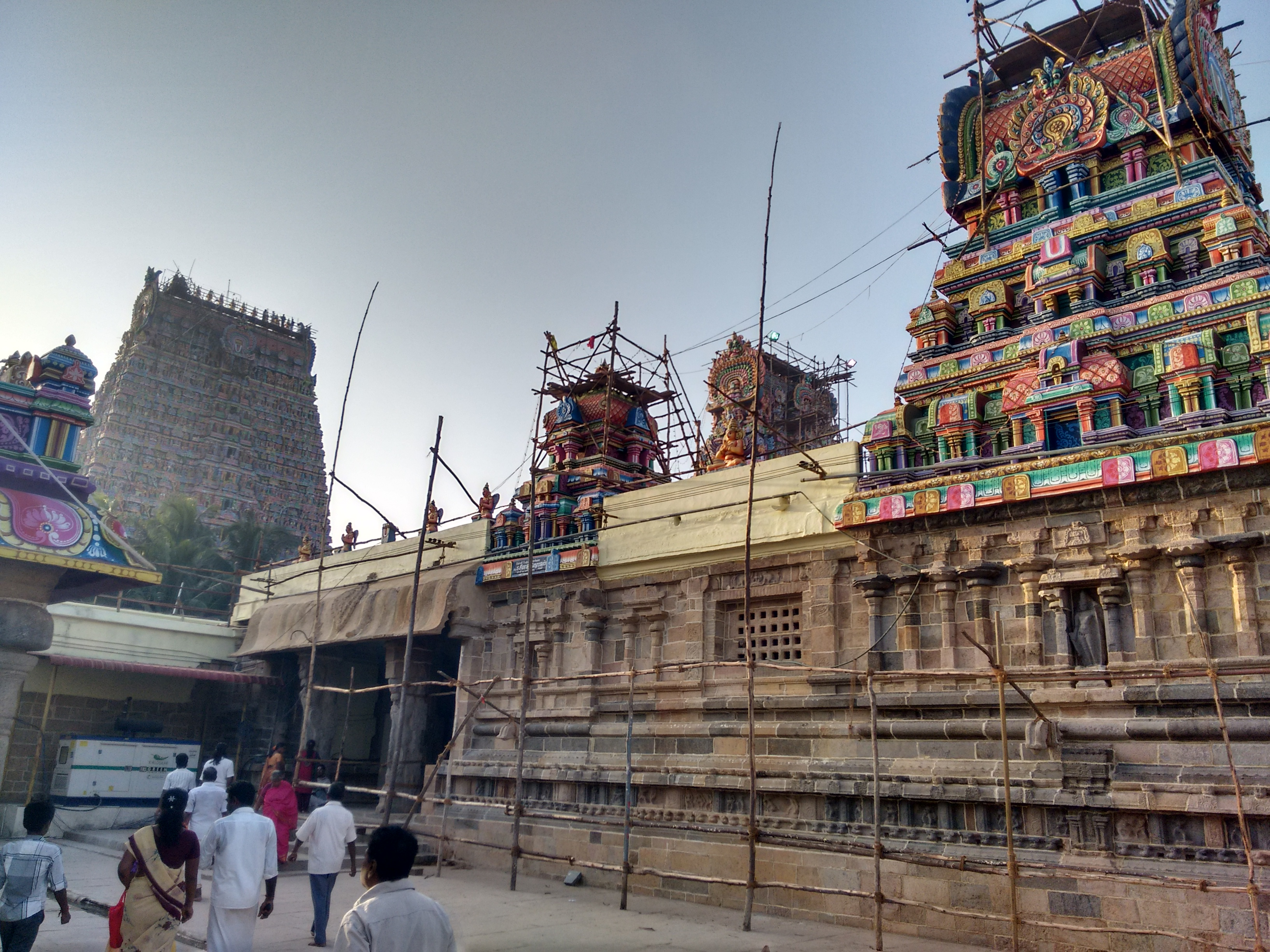

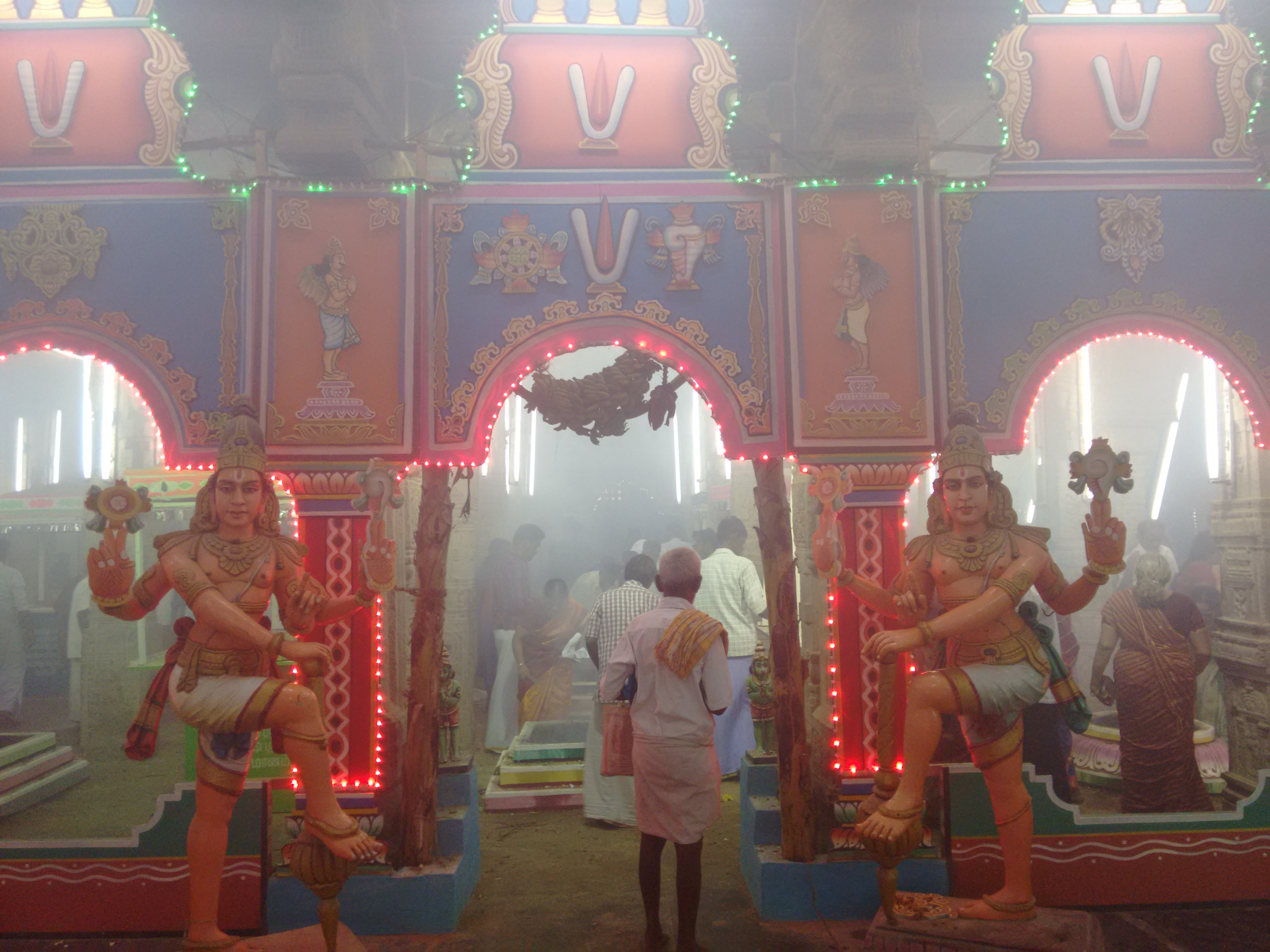

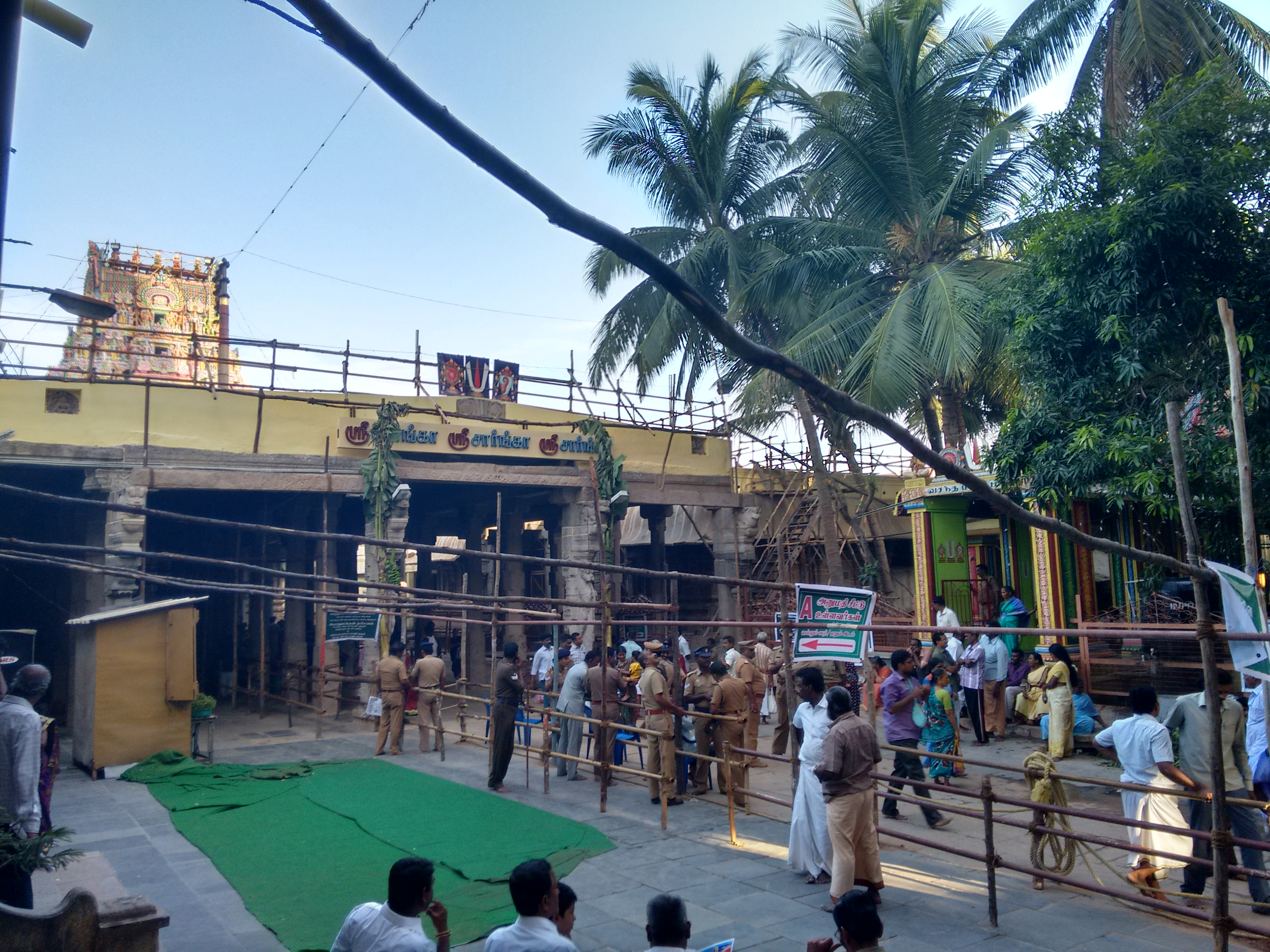

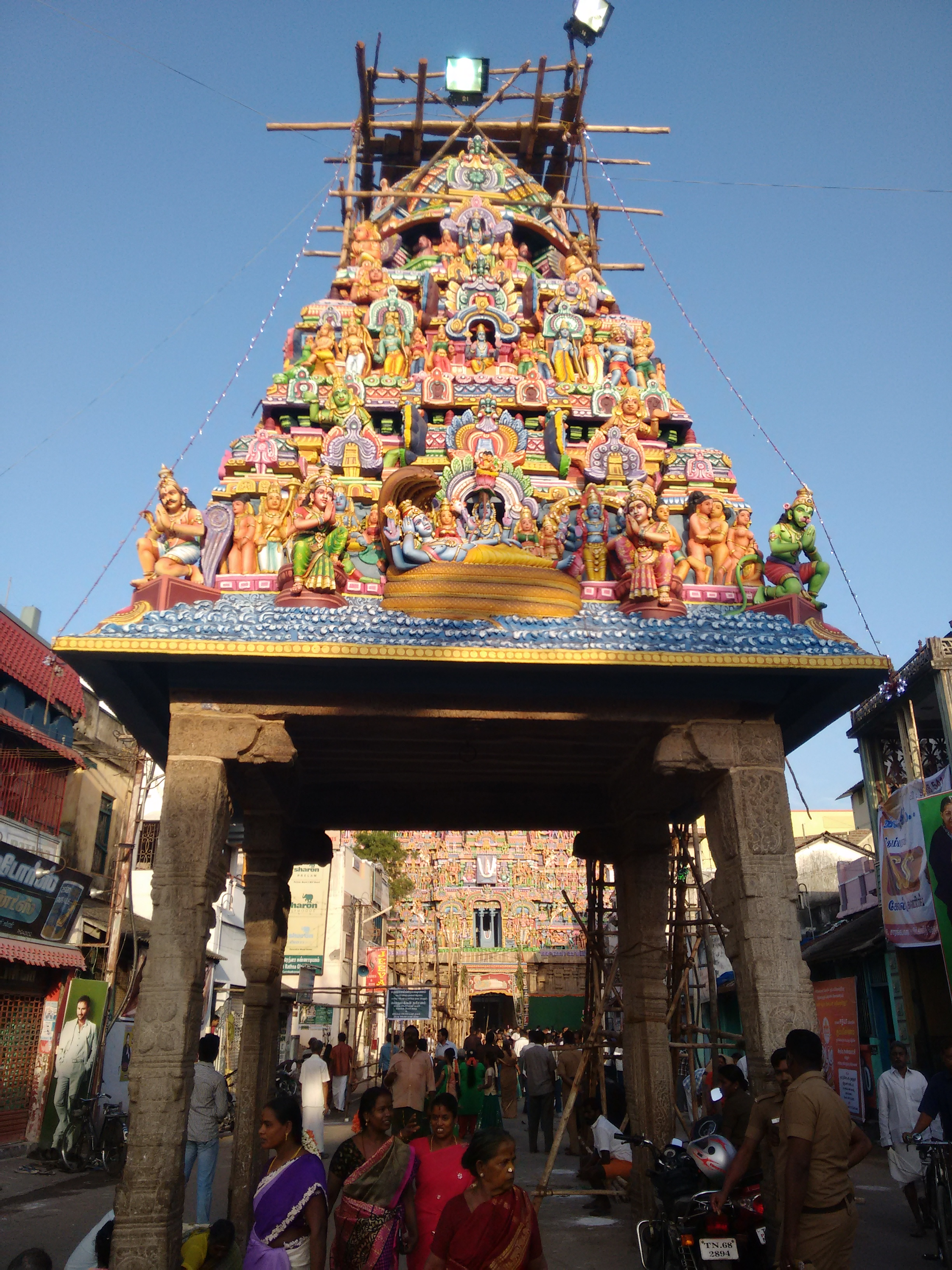

== See also ==
- Mahamaham
- Mahamaham tank, Kumbakonam
- Hindu temples of Kumbakonam
