= Ramaswamy Temple, Kumbakonam =

Ramaswamy Temple
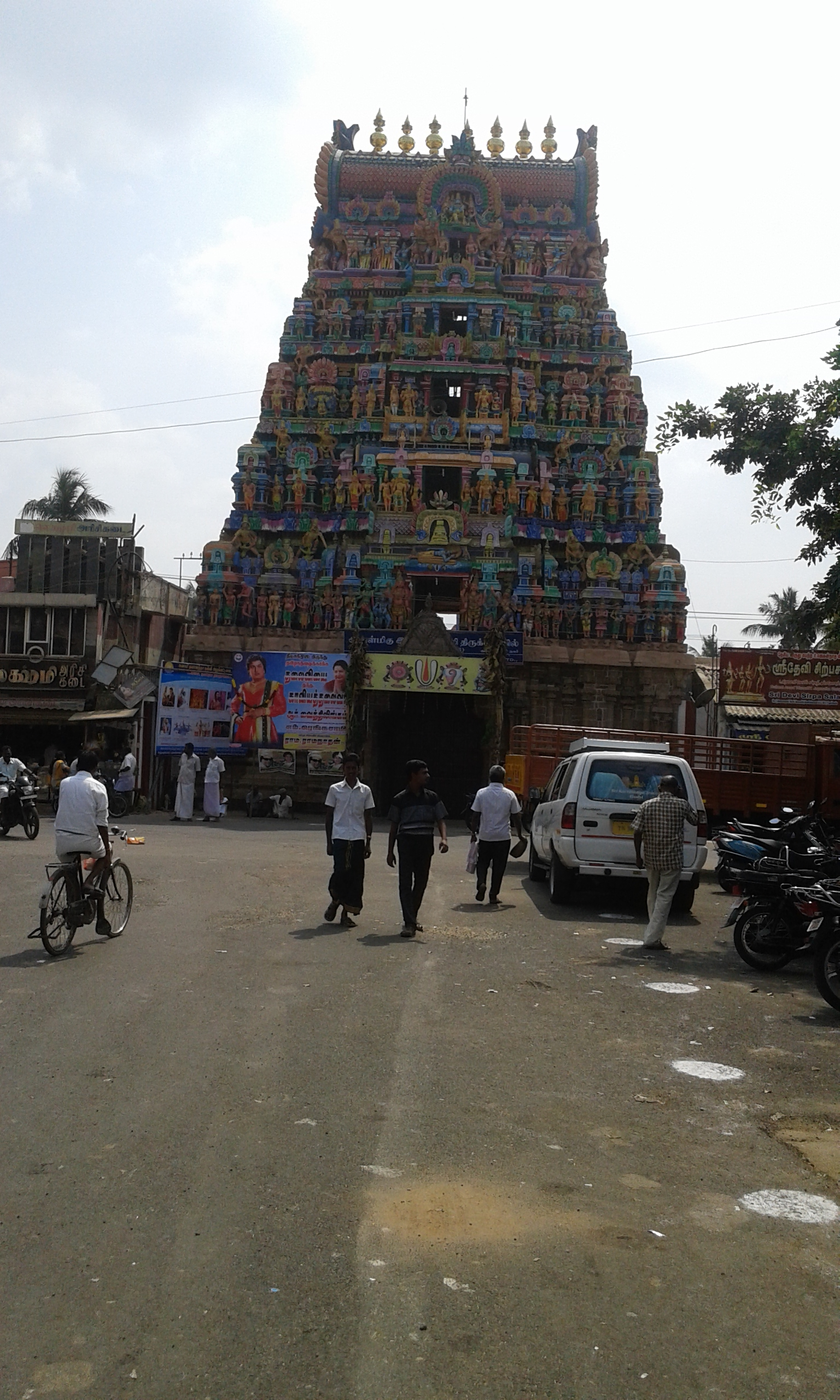
- Ramaswamy Temple, Kumbakonam

Religion
- Affiliation: Hinduism
- District: Tanjore
- Deity: Rama; Sita

Location
- Location: Kumbakonam
- State: Tamil Nadu
- Country: India
- Interactive map of Ramaswamy Temple
- Coordinates: 10.957208°N 79.373659°E

Architecture
- Type: Dravidian architecture

Ramaswamy Temple is a Hindu temple dedicated to Rama, an incarnation of Vishnu, in Kumbakonam, Tamil Nadu, India. It is one of the prominent temples in the town and also one of the most prominent temples dedicated to Rama in India.

The temple was built during the period of Thanjavur Nayaks king Achuthappa Nayak (1560–1614) and completed during the reign of Raghunatha Nayak (1600–34). The temple is enshrined within a huge granite wall and the complex contains all the shrines and the water bodies of the temple. The rajagopuram (the main gateway) has five tiers. There are exquisite sculptures on the pillars of the temple depicting various Hindu legends. Ramayanam is depicted in pictorial format in three segments in the first precinct.

The temple is one of those on the banks of River Kaveri. It is one of five temples of Vishnu connected with the Mahamaham festival which happens once every 12 years in Kumbakonam.

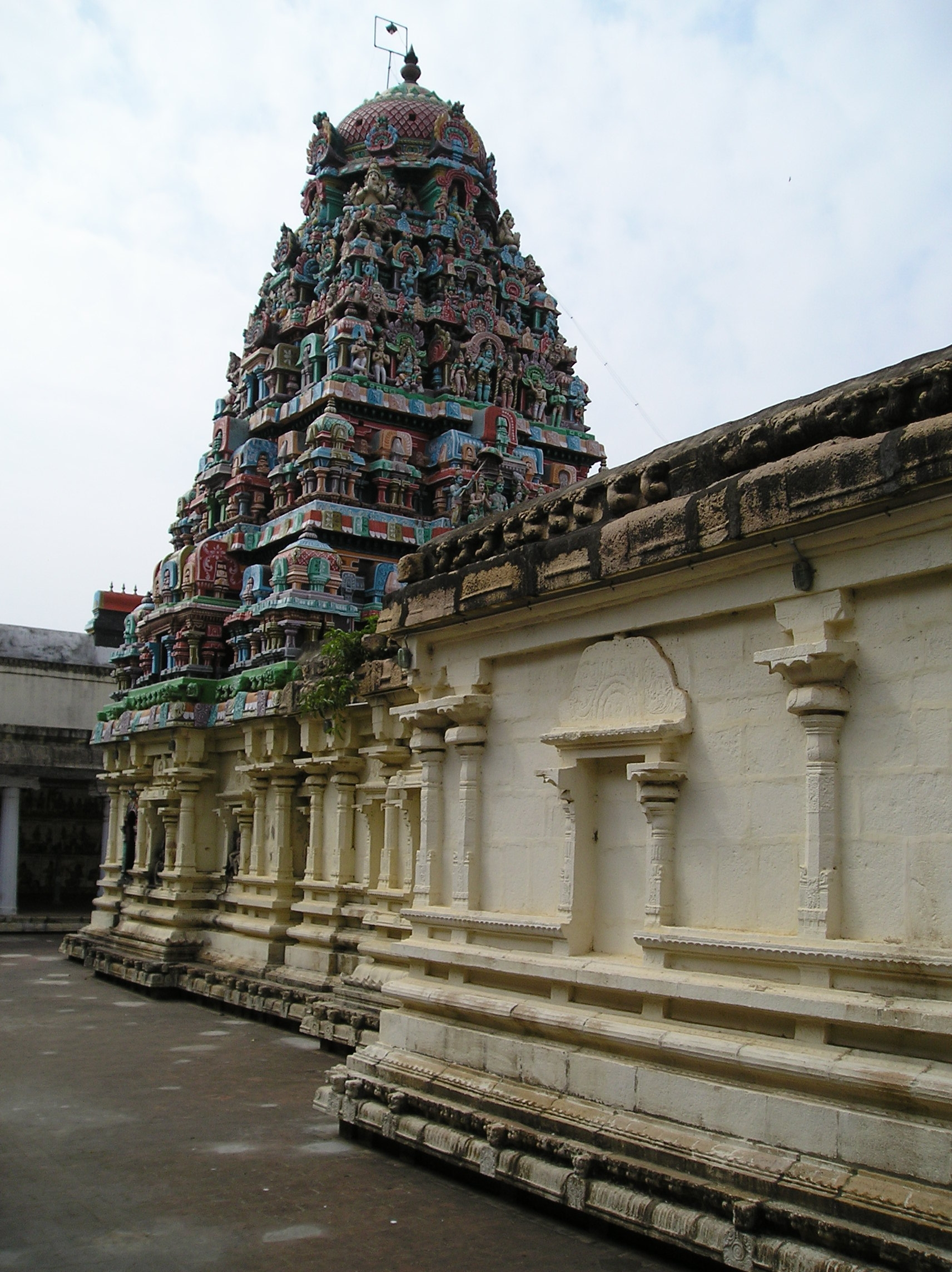
Image of the Vimana

== History ==
The temple has beautiful architecture pieces and has been built by the Thanjavur Nayak kings during the 16th century. Govinda Dikshitar, the prime minister of the Nayaks, constructed the temple. He added a commercial corridor between his new temple and the older Chakrapani temple. As per legend, the idols in the temple were found in a temple tank in the nearby village Darasuram. On 9 September 2015, Ramaswamy temple's consecration (Maha kumbabhisekam) took place. The temple was built during the reign of Thanjavur Nayaks king Achuthappa Nayak (1560–1614) and completed during the reign of Raghunatha Nayak (1600–34). There are later contributions from Thanjavur Maratha kingdom.

== Architecture ==
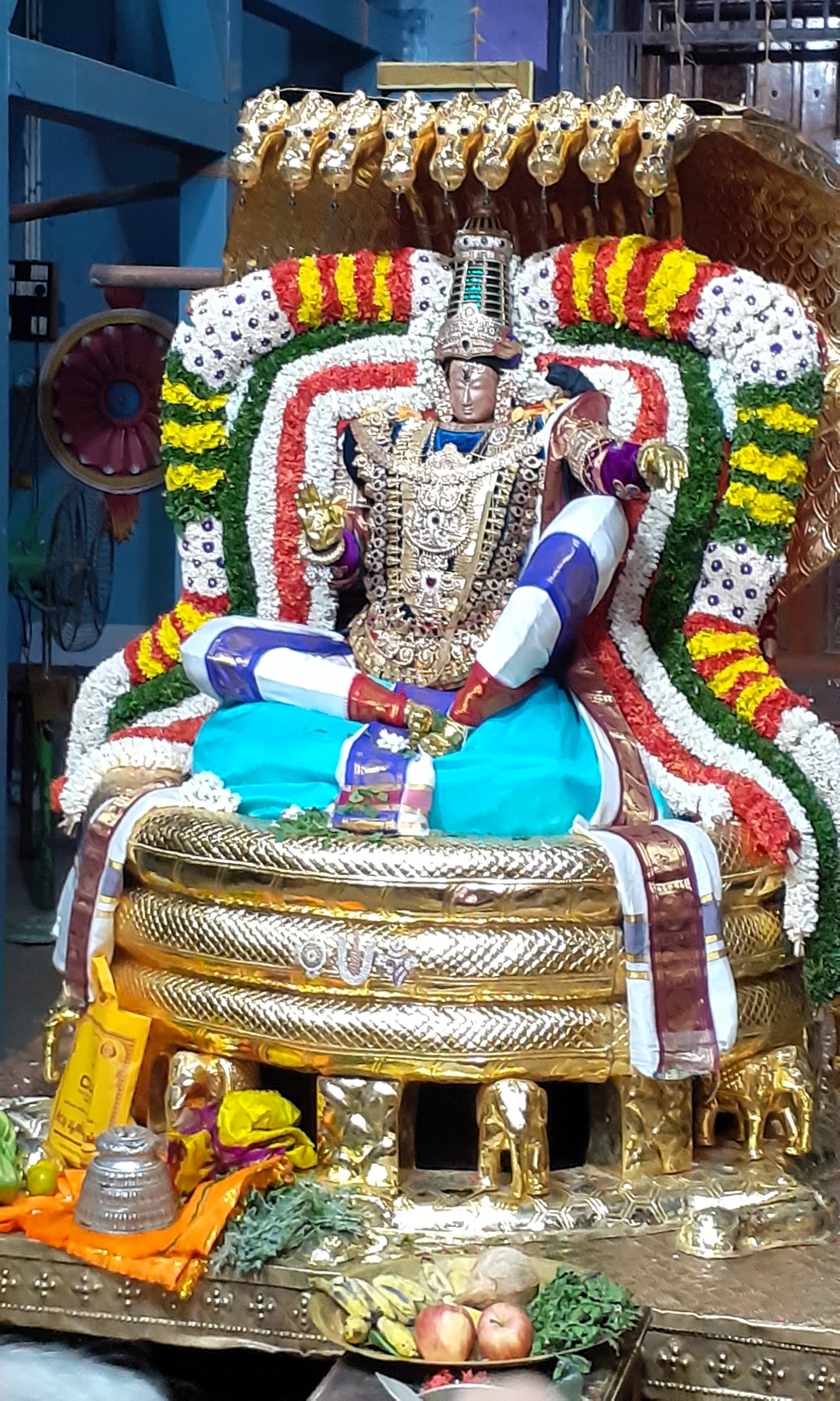
Sesha Vahanam of the temple

The temple is one of the prominent Vishnu temples in Kumbakonam. The temple has a 3-tiered gateway tower (gopuram) surrounded by walls. The central shrine houses the image of Rama in a seated posture with his consort Sita. The other images are of his brothers Lakshmana, Bharatha and Chatruguna in standing posture and Hanuman in worship posture. The sixty four pillars in the hall near the gopuram are sculpted with exquisite finesse depicting various episodes of the epic Ramayana. Each pillar is carved out of a single stone and the delicacy is very prominent. Rama in the temple is depicted with Vyakarna Mudra, while Hanuman is depicted holding manuscripts. The other important aspects of the epic like coronation of Vibishana, coronation of Sugriva, relieving Agalya from her curse and Hanuman playing veena. The temple is atypical of the Nayak style of temples.

On the walls of the prakaram (closed precincts of a temple), Ramayanam is depicted in pictorial format in three segments. One can read through Ramayana pictorially whilst taking three pradakshinams (rounds) of the sanctum. The paintings are believed to have emerged from the Thanjavur Nayak period and were subsequently enhanced during the Thanjavur Maratha kingdom. The paintings of Ramayana are considered one of the major depictions of the epic in art form in India.
