= Meenakshi (Nayak queen) =

Queen of Madurai from 1731 to 1736

Kings and Queen Regents of Madurai Nayak Dynasty
- Part of History of Tamil Nadu
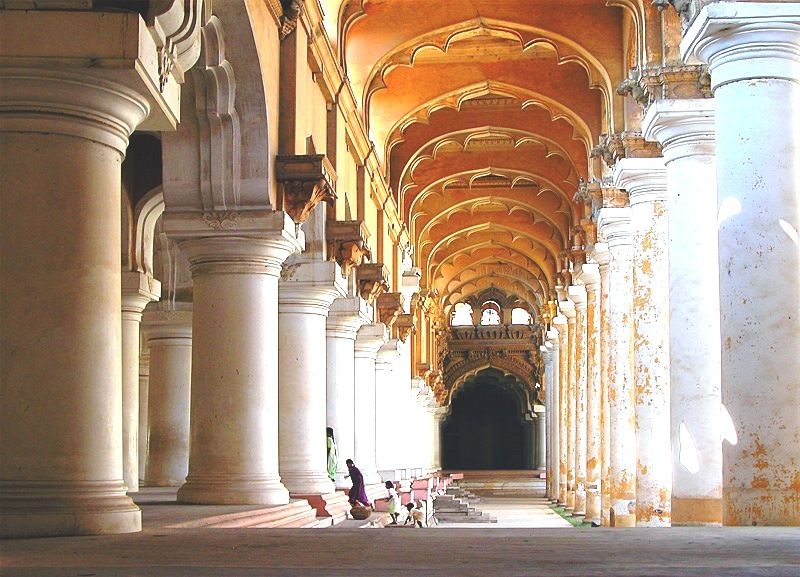

Madurai Nayak rulers
- Viswanatha Nayak: 1529–1563
- Kumara Krishnappa Nayak: 1563–1573
- Joint Rulers Group I: 1573–1595
- Joint Rulers Group II: 1595–1602
- Muttu Krishnappa Nayak: 1602–1609
- Muttu Virappa Nayak: 1609–1623
- Tirumala Nayak: 1623–1659
- Muthu Alakadri Nayak: 1659–1662
- Chokkanatha Nayak: 1662–1682
- Rangakrishna Muthu Virappa Nayak: 1682–1689
- Rani Mangammal‡: 1689–1704
- Vijaya Ranga Chokkanatha Nayak: 1704–1731
- Queen Meenakshi‡: 1731–1736
- ‡ Regent Queens

Capitals
- Madurai: 1529–1616
- Tiruchirapalli: 1616–1634
- Madurai: 1634–1665
- Tiruchirapalli: 1665–1736

Major forts
- Madurai 72 Bastion Fort
- Tiruchirapalli Rock Fort
- Dindigul Fort
- Thirunelvelli Fort

other Military forts
- Namakkal Fort
- Sankagiri Fort
- Attur Fort

Palaces
- Thirumalai Nayak Mahal, Madurai
- Chokkanatha Nayak Palace a.k.a. Durbar Hall, Tiruchirapalli
- Rani Mangammal Tamukkam palace Madurai

Meenakshi (1700–1736) was the queen regent of the Madurai Nayak Kingdom in the Dindigul Fort between 1731 and 1736. She ruled as regent for her adopted son.

She was the granddaughter-in-law of Rani Mangammal. She married king Vijaya Ranga Chokkanatha Nayak of the Madurai Nayak Kingdom. In 1731, her spouse died without heirs. She adopted the son of Vangaru Thirumalai, had the minor boy declared heir, and proclaimed herself as regent of the kingdom in his name.

She was the last ruler in the Madurai Nayaks line.

== See also ==
- Polygar War
