= Tirumala Nayaka =

Nayak of Madurai from 1623 to 1659

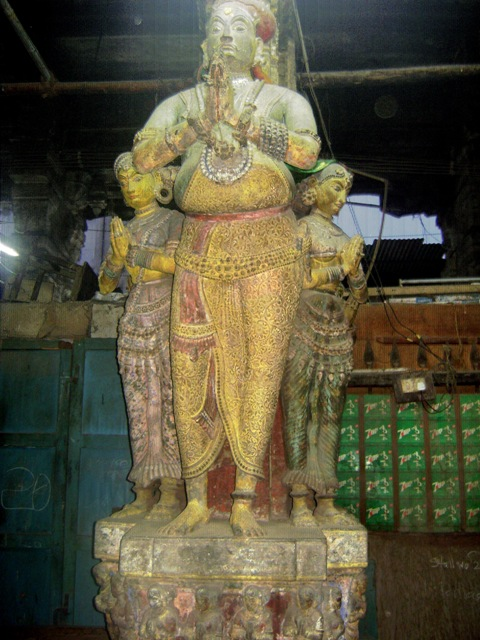
- A statue of Tirumala Nayaka in Madurai

Nayak of Madurai
- Reign: 19 February 1623 – 16 February 1659
- Predecessor: Muttu Virappa Nayak
- Successor: Muttu Alkadri Nayak
- Born: Madurai, Nayak Kingdom (modern day Tamil Nadu, India)
- Died: 16 February 1659; Madurai, Nayak Kingdom (modern day Tamil Nadu, India)
- House: Madurai Nayaks
- Father: Muttu Krishnappa Nayak
- Religion: Hinduism

Tirumala Nayaka (died 16 February 1659) was the ruler of Madurai Nayak Dynasty from 1623 until his death in 1659. His contributions are found in the many splendid buildings and temples of Madurai. He belongs to Nayak caste. His kingdom was under constant threat from the armies of Bijapur Sultanate and the other neighbouring Muslim kingdoms, which he managed to repulse successfully. His territories comprised much of the old Pandya territories, which included Coimbatore, Tirunelveli, Madurai districts, Aragalur in southern Tamil Nadu and some territories of the Travancore kingdom.

Tirumala Nayaka was a great patron of art and architecture, and the Dravidian architecture evolved into the Madurai style. He rebuilt and renovated a number of old temples of the Pandya period. His palace, known as the Tirumala Nayaka Palace, is a notable architectural masterpiece.

Kings and Queen Regents of Madurai Nayak Dynasty
- Part of History of Tamil Nadu
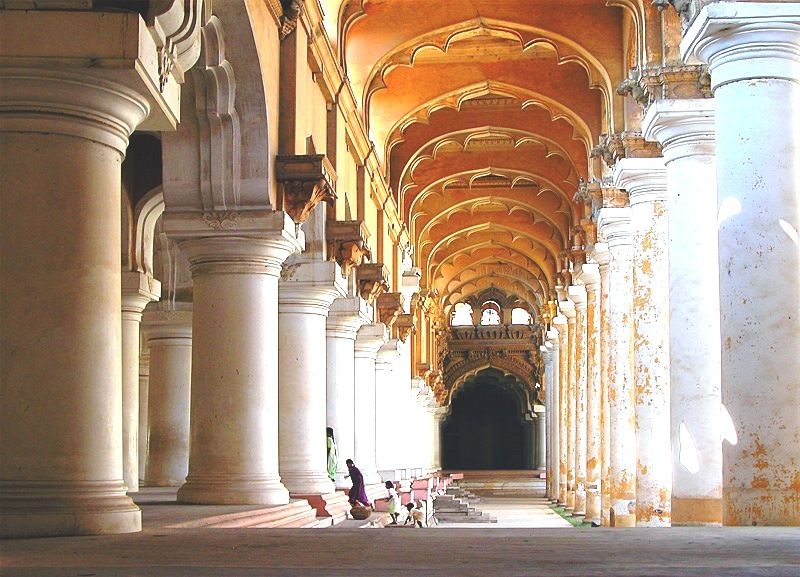

Madurai Nayak rulers
- Viswanatha Nayak: 1529–1563
- Kumara Krishnappa Nayak: 1563–1573
- Joint Rulers Group I: 1573–1595
- Joint Rulers Group II: 1595–1602
- Muttu Krishnappa Nayak: 1602–1609
- Muttu Virappa Nayak: 1609–1623
- Tirumala Nayak: 1623–1659
- Muthu Alakadri Nayak: 1659–1662
- Chokkanatha Nayak: 1662–1682
- Rangakrishna Muthu Virappa Nayak: 1682–1689
- Rani Mangammal‡: 1689–1704
- Vijaya Ranga Chokkanatha Nayak: 1704–1731
- Queen Meenakshi‡: 1731–1736
- ‡ Regent Queens

Capitals
- Madurai: 1529–1616
- Tiruchirapalli: 1616–1634
- Madurai: 1634–1665
- Tiruchirapalli: 1665–1736

Major forts
- Madurai 72 Bastion Fort
- Tiruchirapalli Rock Fort
- Dindigul Fort
- Thirunelvelli Fort

other Military forts
- Namakkal Fort
- Sankagiri Fort
- Attur Fort

Palaces
- Thirumalai Nayak Mahal, Madurai
- Chokkanatha Nayak Palace a.k.a. Durbar Hall, Tiruchirapalli
- Rani Mangammal Tamukkam palace Madurai

== Wars with Mysore ==
In the early years of Tirumala Nayaka's reign, an invasion of Mysore and a counter-invasion of Madura. Recorded in a Mackenzie Manuscript, these conflicts predated Tirumala's later war with the Setupati of Ramnad. While precise dates are elusive, historians like Mr. Rangachari speculate that the Mysore aggression around 1625 may have been instigated by the ambitious Chamaraja Udaiyar, perhaps seeking to assert dominance or rectify past failures. Despite the Mysore general Harasura advance towards Dindigul, but beaten back by Madurai General Ramaiyan, of local leaders like Ramaiyyan Ranganna Nayaka, the polygar of Kannividi. The victorious army persuaded the Mysore army and even besieged the Mysore capital. The successful defense earned Ramaiyan great honor from Tirumala Nayaka.

== Tirumala Nayaka's Madurai ==
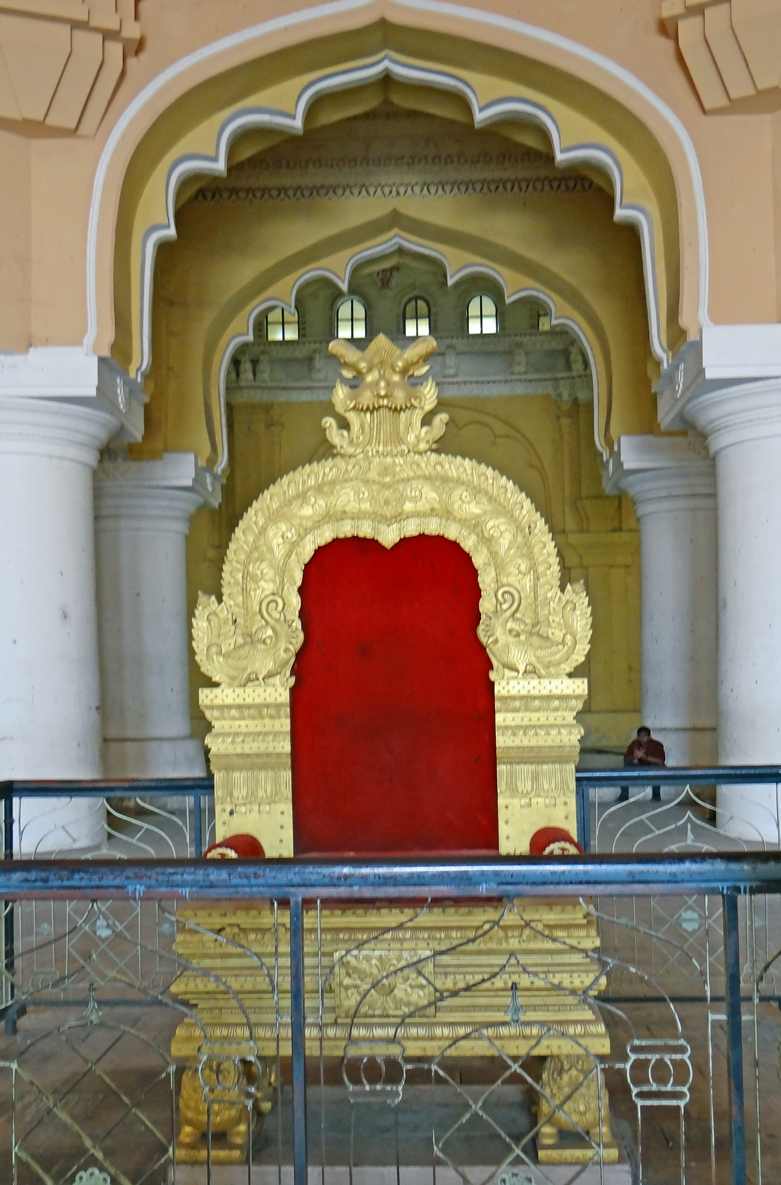
Throne of Thirumalai Nayaka

Tirumala Nayaka's capital was Madurai. The royal residence had been moved from there to Thiruchirapalli by his predecessor, but Tirumala Nayaka moved it back to Madurai again. The reason for this move is claimed to be due to a dream Tirumala Nayaka had but also stated by historians that Madurai has a long history and continuously civilized through ages and Thiruchirapalli is at a threat of immediate attack by Mysore.

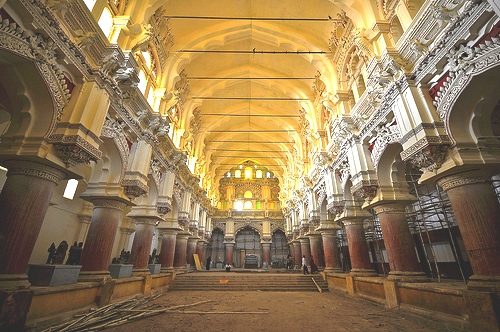
Palace Auditorium/Dance Hall

== Personal life ==
=== Ardent devotee ===
Tirumala Nayaka ate his breakfast only after the pujas were performed at Srivilliputhur Aandal Temple. To get the information that the pujas were completed, the king built mandaps about every five kilometres on the route from Madurai to Srivilliputhur and installed loud bells in them. Each mandap also had a small kitchen. When there was a message to be sent, a series of bells rang.

== Legacy ==
In 1974 the Mannar Thirumalai Naicker College was founded in Madurai by Tamilnadu Naidu Mahajana Sangam.

Tirumala Nayaka Madurai Nayak Dynasty Born: n/a Died: 1659
Regnal titles
Preceded by Mannar Muttu Virappa Nayakkar (1609—1623) (Nayak King of Madurai)	Nayak King of Madurai; 1623-1659	Succeeded by Mannar Muttu Alkadri Nayakkar (1659—1662) (Nayak King of Madurai)
