= Battle of Paramakudi =

- Part of Vijayanagara Campaigns In South
Date	1564
Location	Paramakudi, India
Result	Vijayanagar victory

Belligerents
Vijayanagar Empire: Madurai Nayakas	Polygar of Paramakudi

Commanders and leaders
Kumara Krishnappa Nayak; Periya Kesavappa †; Chinna Kesavppa	Tumbichchi Nayaka (executed)

Strength
18,000	

The Battle of Paramakudi was a conflict between Kumara Krishnappa Nayak and the rebel Tumbicchi Nayaka, who had fortified himself at Paramakudi and begun plundering nearby areas. Nayak's general, Periya Kesavappa, led an attack but was killed in battle. His son, Chinna Kesavappa, then took command with 18,000 troops and successfully stormed the fort after initial struggles. Tumbicchi was captured and executed, ending the rebellion. As a gesture of mercy, Kumara Krishnappa Nayak granted Paramakudi to Tumbicchi's sons, allowing the elder to retain the title of Polygar.

== Background ==
Kumara Krishnappa Nayak though recognized as a brave ruler remains largely enigmatic. Early in his reign, he faced a significant rebellion led by Tumbichchi Nayaka, one of the seventy-two Polygars. The exact reasons behind this uprising remain unknown, but it is remarkable that a single Polygar dared to challenge the authority of the Rayar's vicegerent. This act of defiance was surprising given that Kumara Krishnappa Nayak was supported by a leader like Aiya Nayaga Muthali.

The rebellion led by Tumbichchi Nayaka can be understood by considering that he was likely the same ruler who had controlled the region around 1543. Having once held power, he may have seen Kumara Krishnappa Nayak’s rule as an opportunity to reclaim his former authority. Additionally, several ambitious chiefs constantly seeking wealth and influence saw this uprising as a chance to fulfill their aspirations. they joined forces with Tumbichchi Nayaka.

With alarming threats from the north demanding Aiya Nayaga's urgent attention, he was forced to leave Madurai, making his immediate return unlikely. Recognizing this as a perfect opportunity, the discontented chiefs saw their chance to strike a decisive blow against Kumara Krishnappa Nayak’s authority. Acting swiftly and in secrecy, they gathered a large force and launched a surprise offensive, overrunning vast territories and bringing them under their control. The Governor, caught off guard, had not anticipated such treachery perhaps believing that the nobles who had been generously treated by his father Vishwanatha Nayak would remain loyal.

== Battle ==
Taking advantage of the Governor's unpreparedness, Tumbichchi Nayaka fortified himself in a stronghold at Paramakudi and began plundering the surrounding region, openly defying Kumara Krishnappa Nayak’s authority. However, the Nayak was not one to tolerate such defiance. Quickly regaining control, he took decisive measures to protect both himself and the capital while preparing to end the rebellion. Determined to restore order, he dispatched his general, Periya Kesavappa, to lead a military campaign against the insurgents. Marching with a detachment of troops, Periya Kesavappa besieged the rebel camp at Paramakudi but tragically, he was killed in action within a few days.

Following the death of Periya Kesavappa, his son, Chinna Kesavappa, was appointed to lead the campaign against the rebels. Commanding a formidable force of 18,000 men and supported by thirteen chiefs, he launched a renewed offensive against Tumbicchi Nayaka. Despite facing initial setbacks, Chinna Kesavappa ultimately succeeded in storming the fortified stronghold at Paramakudi. Tumbicchi was captured, and his execution was swift his head was severed and sent to the king as a grim warning to other rebellious Polygars. With this victory the uprising was ended.

== Aftermath ==
Kumara Krishnappa Nayak known for his political acumen, balanced firmness with generosity. While he ended Tumbicchi Nayaka's rebellion, he showed compassion toward the rebel's family. he treated Tumbicchi's widows and two sons with kindness. Although the rebel's estate was confiscated the Nayak granted the village of Paramakudi to the children for their sustenance. he allowed the elder son to assume the title of Polygar ensuring that the family retained a position of some influence.

== See also ==
- Kumara Krishnappa Nayak
- Vijayanagara Empire
- Polygars
