= Mangammal =

Queen Regent of Madurai from 1689 to 1704

Rani Mangammal
- Queen Regent of Madurai Nayak Kingdom
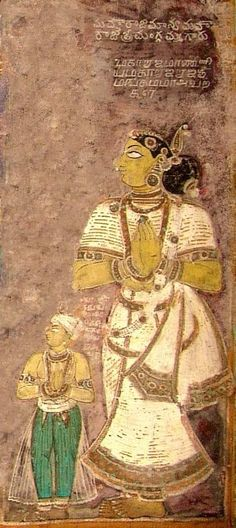
- Rani Mangammal with her grandson Vijaya Ranga Chokkanatha c.17th–18th century

Nayak (Rani) of Madurai
- Reign: 1689–1704
- Predecessor: Rangakrishna Muthu Virappa Nayak
- Successor: Vijaya Ranga Chokkanatha Nayak
- Born: Madurai
- Died: 1705; Madurai, present dayTamil Nadu, India
- Spouse: Chokkanatha Nayak (m. 1659; died 1682)
- Issue: Rangakrishna Muthu Virappa Nayak
- House: Madurai Nayaks
- Father: Tupakula Lingama Nayaka

Kings and Queen Regents of Madurai Nayak Dynasty
- Part of History of Tamil Nadu
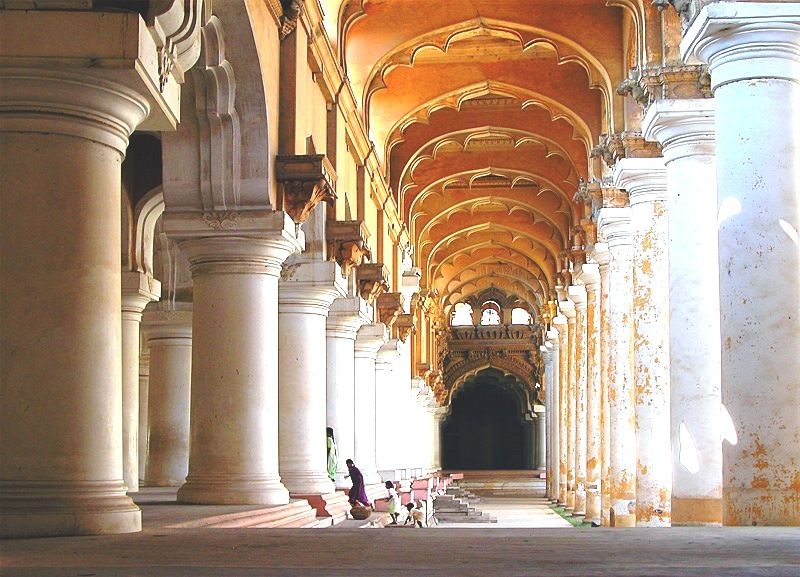

Madurai Nayak rulers
- Viswanatha Nayak: 1529–1563
- Kumara Krishnappa Nayak: 1563–1573
- Joint Rulers Group I: 1573–1595
- Joint Rulers Group II: 1595–1602
- Muttu Krishnappa Nayak: 1602–1609
- Muttu Virappa Nayak: 1609–1623
- Tirumala Nayak: 1623–1659
- Muthu Alakadri Nayak: 1659–1662
- Chokkanatha Nayak: 1662–1682
- Rangakrishna Muthu Virappa Nayak: 1682–1689
- Rani Mangammal‡: 1689–1704
- Vijaya Ranga Chokkanatha Nayak: 1704–1731
- Queen Meenakshi‡: 1731–1736
- ‡ Regent Queens

Capitals
- Madurai: 1529–1616
- Tiruchirapalli: 1616–1634
- Madurai: 1634–1665
- Tiruchirapalli: 1665–1736

Major forts
- Madurai 72 Bastion Fort
- Tiruchirapalli Rock Fort
- Dindigul Fort
- Thirunelvelli Fort

other Military forts
- Namakkal Fort
- Sankagiri Fort
- Attur Fort

Palaces
- Thirumalai Nayak Mahal, Madurai
- Chokkanatha Nayak Palace a.k.a. Durbar Hall, Tiruchirapalli
- Rani Mangammal Tamukkam palace Madurai

Rani Mangammal (Mangamma; died 1705) was a queen regent of the Madurai Nayak kingdom (in present-day Madurai, India) during the minority of her grandson Vijaya Ranga Chokkanatha in 1689—1704. She was a popular administrator and is still widely remembered as a maker of roads and avenues, and a builder of temples, tanks and choultries with many of her public works still in use. She is also known for her diplomatic and political skills and successful military campaigns. The capital of Madurai Kingdom during her times was Tiruchy.

== Life ==
Mangammal was the daughter of Tupakula Lingama Nayaka, and was the wife of a general of Madurai ruler Chokkanatha Nayak (1659–1682). She married Chokkanatha Nayak and became the mother of Rangakrishna Muthu Virappa Nayak (1682—1689).

When her husband died in 1682, he was succeeded by her son Rangakrishna Muthu Virappa Nayak. Upon the death of her son in 1689, her son's widow was pregnant. Her son was succeeded by her grandson in 1689. Her daughter-in-law committed sati, and Mangammal became regent during the minority of her grandson Vijaya Ranga Chokkanatha.

=== Regency ===
During Mangammal's regency, many irrigation channels were repaired, new roads were constructed, avenue trees were planted, and several municipal buildings were completed, including temples and her "Spring Palace" at TumKum. The "Spring Palace" now houses the Gandhi Memorial Museum in Madurai. The highway from Cape Comorin was originally built during the time of Mangammal and it was known as Rani Mangammal Salai.

She played a key role in assisting the Mughal Army during the Siege of Jinji (Gingee). Queen Mangammal had realized that the renegade Rajaram had entrenched himself within Jinji and had been bent upon attacking Thanjavur and Madurai if the Mughal Army were to withdraw. Mangammal soon recognized Aurangzeb as her suzerain and began to assist Zulfiqar Khan in attacking the Jinji fort. When the fort was captured by both Zulfiqar Khan and Mangammal after 8 years, she and her family had control over the fort under the leadership of the Mughals.

When her grandson, Vijayaranga Chokkanatha Nayaka, came of age in 1704, she and her prime minister, Achayya, refused to relinquish power. They were seized by the army commander and executed.

Rani Mangammal first celebrated the Unjal festival in Meenakshi temple during the Tamil month of Ani. During the festivities, all the royal families visit the temple and pay tribute to Meenakshi Amman. Even today, we can see her contemporary portrait in the Unjal Mandapam.

== Gallery ==
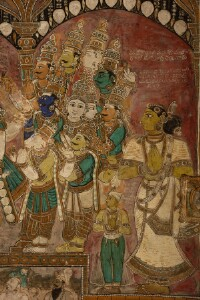
Marriage function is witnessed by the Devas and Rani Mangammal and Muthu Vijayaranga Chokkanatha Nayak.

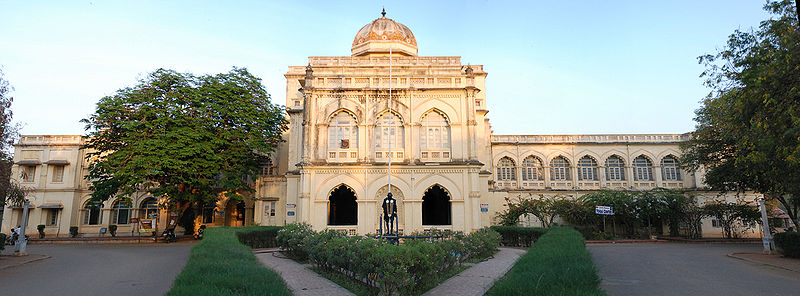
Queen's Summer Palace

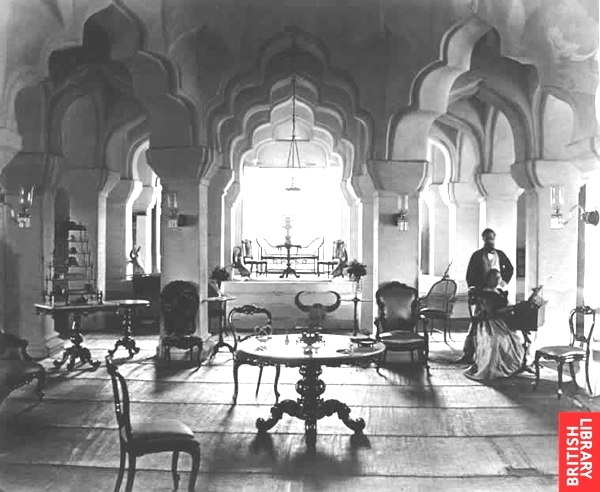
Queen's Summer Palace

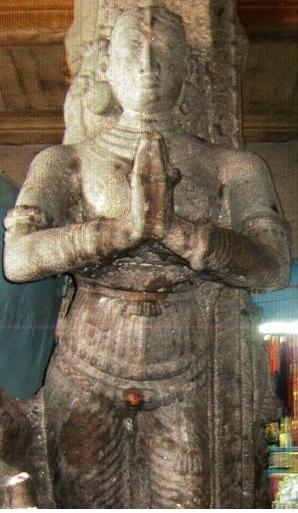
sculpture of Mangammal
