= Tamukkam Ground =

Sports venue in Madurai, India

Tamukkam Ground (Tamukkam maidanam) is located in Tallakulam in Madurai, Tamil Nadu. Historically, this ground was developed by Viswanatha Nayak, the first king of the Madurai Nayak Dynasty, along with Ariyanatha Mudaliyar, and was used for hosting royal entertainments, sports events, and displays of martial arts. Experts in different martial arts such as silambu, sword fighting, etc., used to display their prowess at this ground. Similarly, sporting events such as horse races, bullfights, and elephant races, were also organised here. This ground is also called the Gandhi Museum Ground since it is located near the Gandhi Memorial Museum Madurai.

== Public carnivals ==
This is an important landmark in the city, and because of its size and location, it has become the most preferred venue for hosting big conclaves. It is now maintained by the Corporation of Madurai and is rented out for government and private functions, generating good revenue for the civic body. The total area covers nearly 50,000 sq. ft., which includes the Kalaiarangam, an in-built theater designed for organizing cultural functions and other meetings. The Tamukkam can accommodate more than 1.5 lakh people and the Kalaiarangam nearly 20,000 persons. Some of the well-known annual public events are the Chithirai Exhibition between April–May, the Chamber Trade Fair, and the MADITSSIA industrial Exhibition

== See also ==
- Tamukkam Palace
