= Palayakkaran =

Telugu caste in Tamil Nadu, South India

Palayakkaran is a Telugu caste found in the state of Tamil Nadu in India. Their ancestors were soldiers in what is now the state of Andhra Pradesh, where they served the polygars. Thus, many still speak the Telugu language at home and the Tamil language outside. The community is mostly distributed in the Chengalpattu and North Arcot districts of Tamil Nadu but were originally from what is now the state of Andhra Pradesh.

== Variations ==
They are variously known as Palayakkara Naidu, Palayakkara Naicker, Muthiriya Naidu and Muthiriya Naicker.
