= Madurai invasion of Venad =

Madurai Invasion of Venad
- Part of Madurai-Venad Conflicts
Date	1697
Location	Kerala, India
Result	Madurai Nayaks victory: Travancore Paid Tribute

Belligerents
Madurai Nayakas	Venad Kingdom

Commanders and leaders
Rani Mangammal; Narsappaiya	Raja Ravi Varma

The Madurai invasion of Venad was a military campaign undertaken by the Madurai Nayak kingdom against the Kingdom of Venad in 1697 during the regency of Rani Mangammal. Led by Dalavay Narasappaiya, the Invasion was intended to reassert Madurai's authority after Venad withheld tribute and destroyed a previous Nayak force. The campaign ended in a Madurai victory with Venad paying tribute and presenting valuable gifts.

== Background ==
During the regency of Rani Mangammal relations between the Madurai Nayak kingdom and Travancore deteriorated after the rulers of Travancore stopped paying the customary tribute to Madurai. According to contemporary chronicles and Jesuit accounts, this prompted Rani Mangammal to launch a military campaign against Travancore. Jesuit sources provide additional details about the causes of the conflict, while a 1697 inscription from Vadaseri records that taxes in Nanjinad were remitted for thirteen years because of the devastation caused by the Nayak invasion.

== Invasion ==
During the early years of Rani Mangammal's regency, the ruler of Travancore Ravi Varma, appears to have taken advantage of the political instability in the Madurai Nayak kingdom by withholding the tribute. In response, Madurai sent military expeditions to Travancore each year to collect the tribute by force. Internal divisions within Travancore where powerful ministers had assumed much of the royal authority prevented an effective resistance. As a result, the Nayak forces repeatedly raided the country and returned with plunder. that these incursions might have been prevented had the Aramboly Pass been more strongly defended.

=== First Invasion ===
==== Siege of Kalkulam ====
Around 1696, the ruler of Travancore, Ravi Varma, sought to end both the repeated Madurai invasions and the dominance of the powerful Ettuveettil Pillamar(eight ministers) who had reduced his authority. When the Madurai army entered Travancore to collect the tribute and advanced close to the capital Ravi Varma negotiated with its commanders promising them part of his territory and the fortress of Kalkulam in exchange for military support against the rebellious ministers. With the assistance of the Madurai Army several of the ministers were killed, while others escaped or secured their freedom.

Having weakened the ministerial faction, Ravi Varma then turned against the Madurai army. He besieged the garrison at Kalkulam forcing the Nayak troops to flee. many of the retreating soldiers were pursued and killed resulting in the destruction of most of the invading army, with only a small number surviving to return to Madurai.

=== Second Invasion ===
In about 1697, Rani Mangammal launched another Invasion against Travancore in response to the destruction of the previous Madurai army and Ravi Varma's revolt against Nayak authority. A large force under the command of Dalavay Narasappaiya invaded Travancore. the campaign ended in a hard-fought victory for the Madurai army allowing Narasappaiya to impose terms on the ruler of Travancore.

== Aftermath ==
Following the campaign, the Madurai Nayak army collected the tribute from Travancore and received valuable gifts, including jewellery. the expedition also captured several pieces of artillery, which were regarded as campaign's most significant war booty.

== See also ==
- Travancore Kingdom
- Quilon
- Chokkanatha Nayak
