= Palayakkara Naicker =

Palayakkara Naidu is a Telugu caste that commonly resides in the Indian states of Tamil Nadu (Palayakkars) Andhra Pradesh (Pala Ekari) and some parts of Karnataka. Their ancestors administered as polygars near Andhra - Arcot area. Thus, many still speak the Telugu language at home and the Tamil language outside.

== Variations ==
They are variously known as Palayakkara Naidu, Palayakkaran, PalaEkari.

== Distribution ==
The community are mostly distributed in the Chengalpattu and North Arcot districts of Tamil Nadu but were originally from chittoor, nellore, tirupati, Annamayya districts what is now the state of Andhra Pradesh.
