= Ariyanatha Mudaliar =

16th-century Indian politician

Ariyanatha Mudaliar was the Delavoy (General) and the Chief Minister of the greatest of the Nayaka domains established by the Vijayanagar viceroy and later ruler of Madurai, Viswanatha Nayak (1529–64). He assisted in running a quasi-feudal organisation of regions called the poligar or the palayakkarar system where the regions are divided into palayams (small principalities) and are independently governed by poligars or palayakkarars (petty chiefs).

The Aiyaram Kaal Mandapam, or Thousand Pillared Hall, in the famous Meenakshi Temple was constructed by him in 1569. There is a statue of him at the entrance.

== Early life ==
Ariyanatha Mudaliar was born into a Tamil Vellalar clan in Meippedu village, Tondaimandalam (the present day Kanchipuram district). According to a modern descendant, he learned Tamil and Mathematics from a teacher for free and in his spare time mastered the ancient Tamil martial art of Silambam and others like sword fight and wrestling. At the age of 16, he was encouraged to go the court of Krishnadevaraya, the king of Vijayanagara. Ariyanatha soon rose to prominence and became the chief accountant of the Vijayanagara empire.

== Rise to power ==
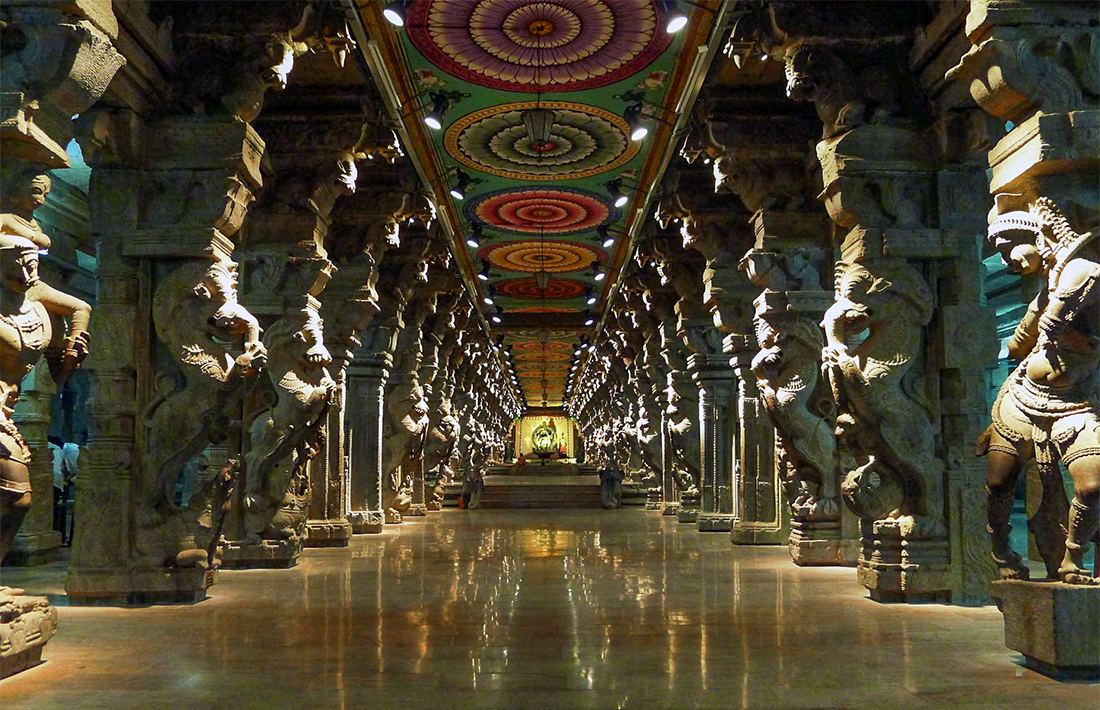
A section of the Aayiram Kaal Mandapam (thousand-pillared hall), built by Ariyanatha Mudaliar, in the morning.

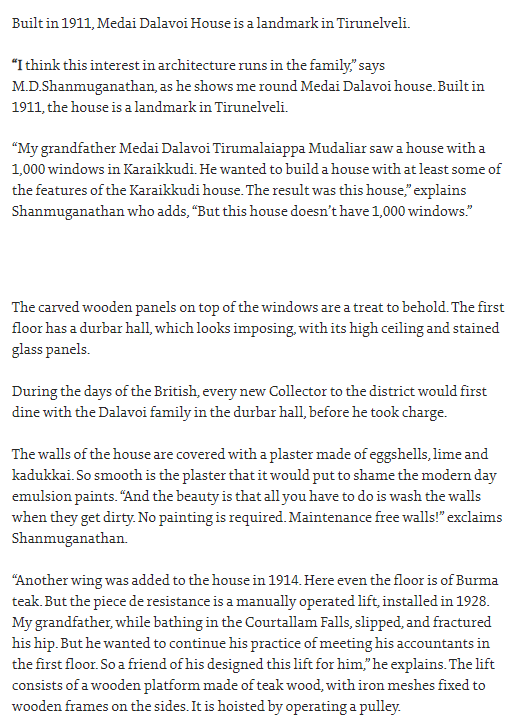
Hindu Article on Ariyanatha Mudaliar

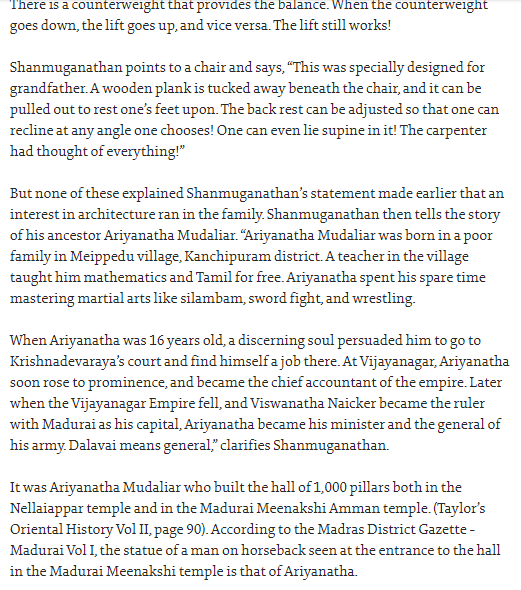
Hindu Article on Ariyanatha Mudaliar

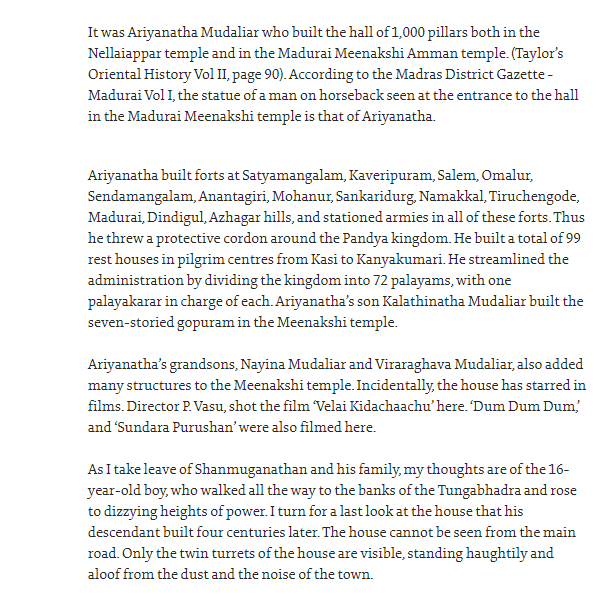
Hindu Article on Ariyanatha Mudaliar

The process of consolidation of the Tamil region under the Vijayanagara empire began at the start of the 16th century. The regions were brought primarily under the control of the Nayaka kingdoms of Madurai, Tanjore and Senji. Though the different Nayaka regions were autonomous, they all acknowledged the sovereignty of the Vijayanagara and its emperor, Krishnadevaraya.

During the process of consolidation, Krishnadevaraya dispatched one of his most successful generals, Nagama Nayaka, on a campaign to punish Virasekhara Chola who had plundered the petty Pandyan regions. The Pandyas were under the protection of the Vijayanagara empire. Having put down Virasekhara, the general Nagama Nayak claimed Madurai for himself. Viswanatha Nayak, the son of Nagama Nayak, was more loyal to the king Krishnadevaraya than to his father. He overthrew his father and handed him over to Krishnadevaraya and as a reward for his loyalty the king appointed Viswanatha Nayaka as the governor of Madurai and other provinces in the neighbouring Tamil country..Later when the Vijayanagar Empire fell, and Viswanatha Naicker became the ruler with Madurai as his capital, Ariyanatha became his minister and the general of his army. Dalavai means general.

It was Ariyanatha Mudaliar who built the hall of 1,000 pillars both in the Nellaiappar temple and in the Madurai Meenakshi Amman temple. (Taylor’s Oriental History Vol II, page 90). According to the Madras District Gazette - Madurai Vol I, the statue of a man on horseback seen at the entrance to the hall in the Madurai Meenakshi temple is that of Ariyanatha. Ariyanatha built forts at Satyamangalam, Kaveripuram, Salem, Omalur, Sendamangalam, Anantagiri, Mohanur, Sankaridurg, Namakkal, Tiruchengode, Madurai, Dindigul, Azhagar hills, and stationed armies in all of these forts. Thus he threw a protective cordon around the Pandya kingdom. He built a total of 99 rest houses in pilgrim centres from Kasi to Kanyakumari. He streamlined the administration by dividing the kingdom into 72 palayams, with one palayakarar in charge of each. Ariyanatha’s son Kalathinatha Mudaliar built the seven-storied gopuram in the Meenakshi temple.

Ariyanatha’s grandsons, Nayina Mudaliar and Viraraghava Mudaliar, also added many structures to the Meenakshi temple.

Viswantha Nayak was succeeded by his son, Krishnappa Nayak, who together with Ariyanatha expanded the Nayak's Madurai kingdom and brought most of the ancient Pandyan territory under its rule.
