= V. Ramabadra Naidu =

Zamindar of Vadagarai

- Born: V. Ramabadra Naidu; 23 December 1873; Periyakulam, Madura District, British India
- Died: 26 December 1929 (aged 56); Periyakulam, Madura District, British India
- Children: Nagama Ramabhadra Nayak (b.1897)
- Parents: Venkataswamy Naicker (father); Kanakamma (mother)

Dewan Bahadur V. Ramabadra Naidu (23 December 1873 – 26 December 1929) was the Zamindar of Vadagarai and Doddappanaickanur. In 1908, the title Dewan Bahadur was awarded to him. He was elected to the Madras Legislative Council in 1910.

== Early life ==
Ramabadra Naidu was born on 23 December 1873 to Venkataswamy Naicker and Kanakamma, in Periyakulam of the Madura (now Theni) district, in the state of Madras. He belonged to the balija clan. his elder son Nagama Ramabhadra Nayak as an officer in the Indian Territorial Force.

== Ancestry ==
He was a lineal descendant of the famous warrior Ramabhadra Nayak, who had held the post of Military Chief and Collector of Revenue under his close relative Viswanatha Nayak, the ruler of Madurai country.

== Positions held ==
- Chairman, Municipal council, Periyakulam, 1904;
- President, Cooperative Society, Periyakulam
- Member, Central Agricultural Committee
- Member, Madras Legislative Council since 1910; representing the Zemindars of the southern group
- Member, Advisory Committee of the Court of Wards
- founded President the Victoria Memorial High School, Periyakulam
- Member of a large number of Devasthanam Committees in Rameswaram and Periyakulam
- received Coronation Certificate, 1903
- Member District and Taluk Boards of Madura since 1896, and 1895 respectively
- Rao Bahadur, 1908

== Death ==
Ramabadra Naidu died on December 26, 1929.
