= Kumara Krishnappa Nayak =

Nayaka of Madurai from 1564 to 1572

Krishnappa Nayaka I
- King of Madurai

Nayaka of Madurai
- Reign: 25 January 1564 – 3 December 1572
- Coronation: 25 January 1564
- Predecessor: Viswanatha Nayak
- Successor: Virappa Nayaka
- Died: 3 December 1572
Names
- Kumara Krishnappa Nayaka
Era dates
- 15th
Regnal name
- Kumara Krishnappa Nayaka I
- House: Madurai Nayaks
- Father: Viswanatha Nayak
- Religion: Hinduism
- Military career
- Allegiance: Vijayanagara Empire
- Branch: Madurai Nayakas
- Rank: Senapati
- Conflicts: Tumbichchi Nayaka Rebellion; Invasion of Ceylon; First Battle of Puttalam; Second Battle of Puttalam

Kumara Krishnappa Nayak (died 3 December 1572) was the ruler of the Madurai Nayak dynasty from 1564 until his death in 1572. He was the successor of Vishwanatha Nayak. He started ruling the country after his father's death in 1564. He made Tiruchirapalli as his capital.

== Military career ==
Under Kumara Krishnappa Nayak's rule, the Madurai Nayak dynasty expanded. Most of the ancient Pandyan territories came under the Nayaks under his rule.

=== Rebellion of Tumbichchi Nayaka ===
Tumbichchi Nayaka the chief of tottiyars lead a rebellion against Krishnappa Nayaka's authority and devastated the country. Krishnappa Nayaka entrusted the army to his general Pedda Kesavappa Nayaka to quell the rebellion. Kesavappa nayaka failed to subjugate the rebellion he was defeated and killed in the battle with Tumbichchi Nayaka. Foiled in the first attempt Krishnappa Nayaka sent another army under the command of late general's son Chinna Kesava along with about a thirteen polygars the second attempt was successful Tumbichchi Nayaka was captured and Beheaded by Chinna Kesava.

=== Invasion of Ceylon ===
Kandy Ruler Jayavira Bandara friend of Tumbichchi Nayaka Provoked to remit tribute and took over arms against Krishnappa Nayaka. Outraged at this Krishnappa called the services of his fifty two polygars with their troops embarked for Ceylon and landed at Mannar.

==== Battle of Puttalam ====
Kandyan ruler sent an army of 40,000 under four ministers and eight governors to repel the advancing Madurai Army a battle took place at Puttalam the kandyan army was defeated by Chinna Kesava Nayaka. 20,000 troops and few chiefs two ministers, five chieftains and others were taken as prisoners and treated with respect by Krishnappa Nayaka.

==== Second Battle of Puttalam ====
The captured Kandyan troops urged the king in vain to yield. The King collected 60,000 troops and 10,000 Portuguese and Marched to the battlefield a bloody battle ensued in which 8,000 Portuguese and as many Sinhalese lost their lives the Jayavira Bandara was killed in the battle. His dead body was taken due honours to the kandy Krishnappa Nayaka remained there for three days. The deceased kings family was sent to Arugam bay old capital of ceylon. After appointing his brother Vijaya Gopala Nayaka as viceroy in ceylon and arranging for regular payment of tribute Krishnappa Nayaka returned to Madurai.

=== Battle of Tallikota ===
In 1565 the Sultan rulers of the Deccan defeated Vijayanagar, the suzerain of the Nayaks, at the battle of Talikota. Vijayanagar had to abandon their capital Vijayanagara and reestablish at Penukonda in Anantapur, then reestablish at Vellore Fort and Chandragiri near Tirupathi, which later granted land to the British East India Company to build a fort at the present day Chennai. Finally they settled at Vellore in North Arcot. Their governors at Madurai, Kalahasti, Gingee and Tanjore still paid them tribute and other marks of respect; but in later years, when their suzerainty became weak, the Nayaks ruled independently.

== Succession ==
Krishnappa was succeeded by his two sons Muttu Krishnappa and Muttu Virapppa in 1573.
