= Namakkal Fort =

Historical fort in Tamil Nadu, India

- Part of Tamil Nadu
- Namakkal, Tamil Nadu, India
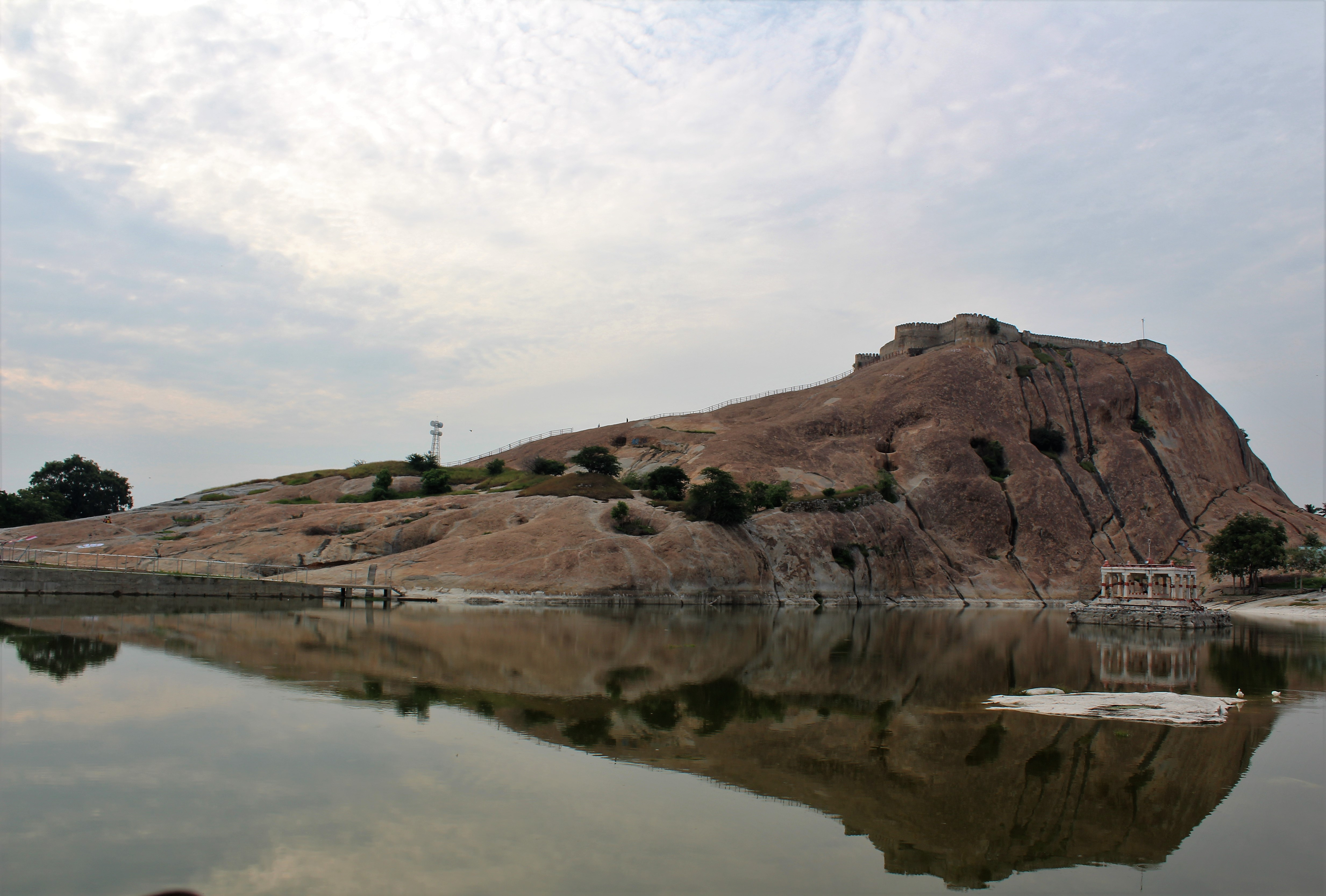
- Namakkal Fort

Site information
- Type: Forts
- Controlled by: Department of Archaeology

Location
- Location within Tamil Nadu
- Coordinates: 11.22210151545568°N 78.1652995017064°E

Namakkal Fort is a historic fort present in Namakkal in Namakkal district in the South Indian state of Tamil Nadu. The fort was built during the reign of Thirumalai Nayak of Madurai in 17th century. It was under the dominion of Tipu Sultan and then switched hands to the British East India Company as a part of Srirangapattinam treaty. The fort was used as a watch tower and garrison by the ruling empire.

The fort is located on the top of a hillock made of a single rock, 75 m (246 ft) tall. There is a temple and a mosque that are located within the fort, both of which are popular tourist attractions of the town. In modern times, the fort is under the control of the Archaeological Department of the Government of Tamil Nadu.

== Legend ==
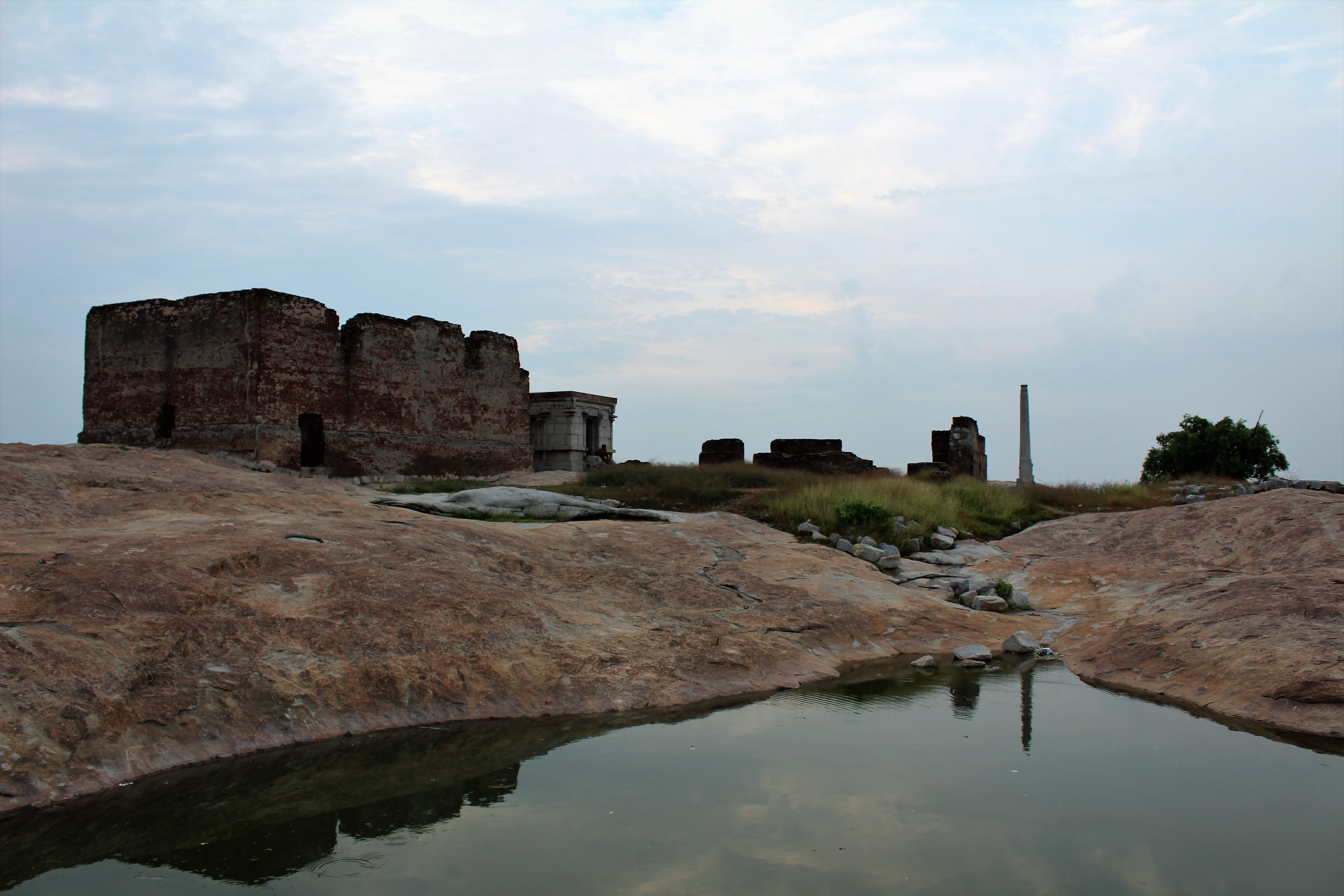
Image of the fort structure

According to Hindu legend, the hillock on which the fort is located was carried by Hanuman, a disciple of Sri Ram from the epic Ramayana. The hillock is known as Namagiri and also as Saligramam, the image of Vishnu in a divine stone. Hanuman was flying with the Sanjeevi Paravatha, the sacred mountain from Himalayan mountain to Sri Lanka. On his way, he saw the Kamalalayam tank and descended there to perform his morning worship. He placed the saligramam he brought from Himalayas and when he opened his eyes after the worship, he saw the stone grown to its current size. A divine voice asked him to leave the stone in the place itself. As per another legend, Narasimha, an avatar of Vishnu, after destroying Asura Hiranyakasipu, was still in ferocious mood. Hanuman, brought him to the place where Mahalakshmi, the wife of Vishnu was doing penance.

== History ==
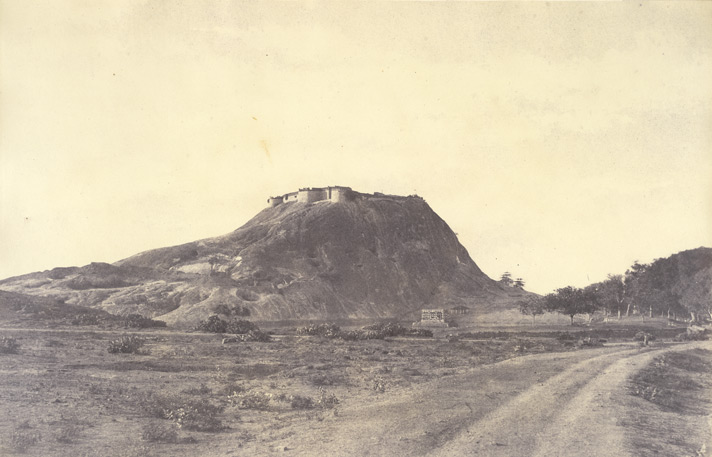
Old Photograph of Namakkal fort

The fort was built by the Madurai Nayaks during the 17th century. It is reported to have been built by Ramachandra Nayakar, the Poligar of Sendamangalam, during the reign of Thirumalai Nayak. The fort was captured by the British in 1768, to be lost to Hyder Ali. His son Tipu Sultan went on utilize the fort as a arms depot and watch tower. It switched hands to the British East India Company who got five forts including this one as a part of the Treaty of Srirangapatnam. The British used the fort for storing food grains and arms in the hillock. The British used this as a watch tower. Lieutenant Fehrszen used this as a garrison for during the Peninsular war. In modern times, the fort was declared as a monument of national importance. It is maintained and administered by the Archaeological Department of the Government of Tamil Nadu.

== Architecture ==
The fort is located in the centre of Namakkal town over a hillock made of single rock named Namagiri. The fort is located on the top of the rock, 75 m (246 ft) tall. There is a Narasimha Murthy temple and a mosque that are located within the fort, both of which are popular tourist attractions of the town. Kamalalayam tank, located at foothills, is commonly associated with the fort. The fort is made up with well-cut blocks of the same stone as the hill and cemented to the rock by mortar. The higher portions of the fort are held by their own weight and accurate fitting. The area of the fort is around 1.5 acres (6,100 m^{2}) on the top. In modern times, an 8 ft image of Hanuman is reinstalled on the fort, facing the Narasimha image on the top of the fort. The fort is maintained by the Archaeological Survey of India.

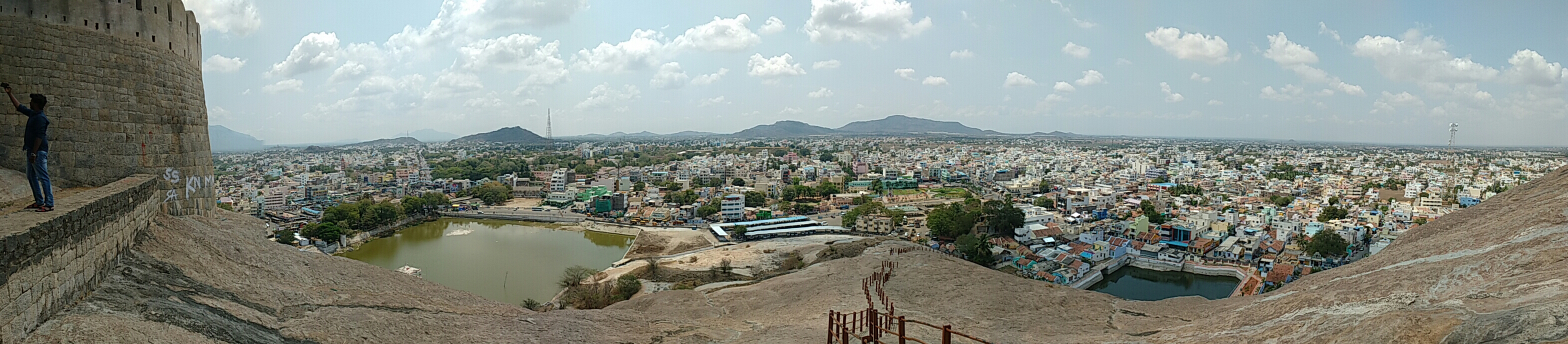
Panoramic View of Namakkal from Hillock
