= Thirumalai Nayakkar Mahal =

17th-century palace in Madurai, Tamil Nadu, India

Thirumalai Nayakkar Mahal Thirumalai Nayak Palace
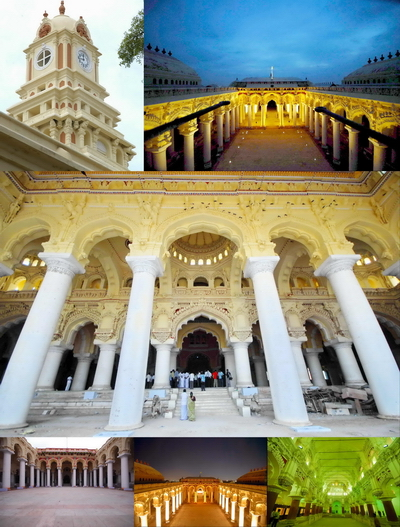
- Main inner corridor of Thirumalai Nayakkar Mahal

- Location within India

General information
- Architectural style: Vijayanagara architecture (Tamil Country style)
- Location: Madurai, India
- Coordinates: 9.9148°N 78.1243°E
- Construction started: c. 1620s
- Estimated completion: c. 1636
- Client: King Thirumalai Nayak of Madurai
- Owner: Archaeological Survey of India; Government of Tamil Nadu

Dimensions
- Other dimensions: Length: 270 m (890 ft); Width: 200 m (660 ft)

Technical details
- Size: 554,000 sq ft (51,500 m^{2})

Design and construction
- Engineer: Unknown

Thirumalai Nayakkar Mahal is a palace located 2 km (1.2 mi) to the southeast of the Meenakshi Amman Temple in central Madurai, Tamil Nadu, India. It was built by Tirumala Nayaka, a king of the Madurai Nayak dynasty who ruled Madurai from 1623 to 1659, and was completed in 1636. The remaining structure is the main palace which served as the living quarters of the king, but the original palace complex was four times larger. It is now a protected national monument.

== History ==
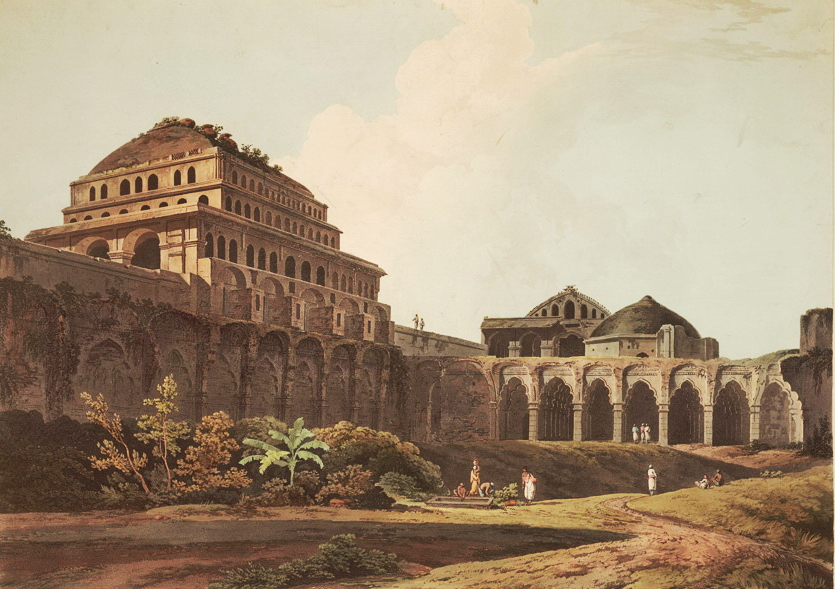
1798 painting by Thomas Daniell of ruins of the palace at Madurai

The Nayaks of Madurai ruled from 1545 until the 1740s, and Tirumala Nayaka (1623–1659) was one of their greatest kings, notable for constructing various buildings in and around Madurai, including the Thirumalai Nayakkar Mahal.

In the almost 400 years since the palace was completed, many parts of it have suffered the destructive effects of war. During the time of the East India Company, a few buildings were still in sufficient repair to be converted into granaries, store-houses, and powder magazines by the British garrison. According to British records, king Tirumala Nayaka's grandson had demolished much of the fine structure and removed most of the ornaments and woodcarvings to build his own Chokkanatha Nayak Palace in Tiruchirapalli. However, some researchers consider this unlikely and that the palace was more probably scavenged for building materials by local communities. The British subsequently used the palace as a military barracks and then a factory for weaving and paper production, demolishing the adjacent complexes that were in advanced ruin, thereby impacting the overall grandeur of the place.

The palace would later serve as the ''Cutchery'' or district court of Madura-Ramnad until 1970. Lord Napier, the Governor of Madras, partially restored the palace from 1866 to 1872, and further restoration work was carried out in the 2010s. Today, visitors can access the entrance gate, the main hall, and the dance hall.

== Design and construction ==
Thirumalai Nayak built the palace as a focal point of his capital at Madurai, intending it to be one of the grandest in South India. The interior of the palace is richly decorated, surpassing many of its Indian contemporaries in scale, while the exterior is in a more austere style. While many Tamil Nadu government agencies categorise the architecture of Thirumalai Nayaka Palace as Indo-Saracenic or Dravidian, art historians consider the palace to be an outstanding example of Vijayanagara architecture in its late Tamil Country Nayaka style. The palace's architecture does reflect the characteristic features of Vijayanagara architecture, including the integration and harmonization of Indo-Islamic and Persian influences.

Local legend goes that the king hired an Italian architect to design the complex, and hence some categorise it as Dravidian–Italian architecture. During this period, Madurai was a thriving kingdom, visited by traders, missionaries, and travelers from Portugal, the Netherlands, and other European countries, which might have influenced the palace's design. However, some historians view these theories regarding the possible intervention of European architects and craftsmen, or of a major Western artistic influence on its design, to be motivated by a priori and colonial prejudices.

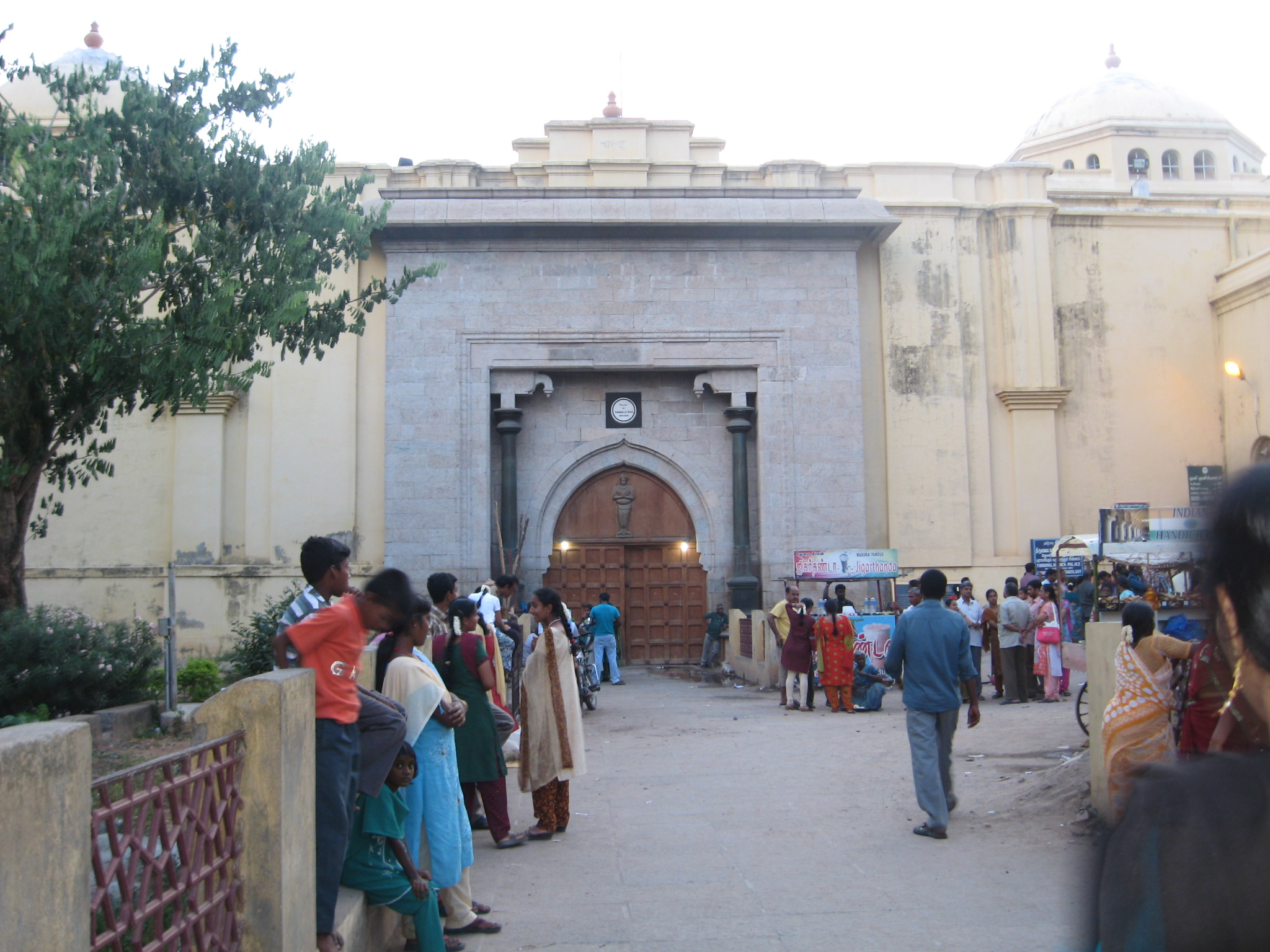
Entrance to Tirumal Naicker Palace

== Materials used ==
The palace buildings were constructed using foliated brickwork and finished with an exquisite stucco called chunam, made by mixing shell lime with egg white, which gave the surface and details a smooth and glossy texture. The pillars supporting the numerous arches were also made of foliated brickwork decorated with shell lime, and could carry a valance and an entablature up to a height of 20 metres (66 ft). The pavilions, topped with finials that were covered with gold, are on both sides of the courtyard, and the steps leading up to the hall were formerly flanked by two equestrian statues of excellent workmanship.

== Remaining sections ==
The original palace was 900 ft (270 m) long by 660 ft (200 m) wide and covered a total area of 554,000 sq ft (51,500 m^{2}). But during the 18th century many structures that were part of the palace were pulled down or incorporated into buildings in the adjacent streets. What remains is the enclosed court known as the Svarga Vilasam and a few adjoining buildings, with the courtyard and the dancing hall being the palace's major centers of attraction.

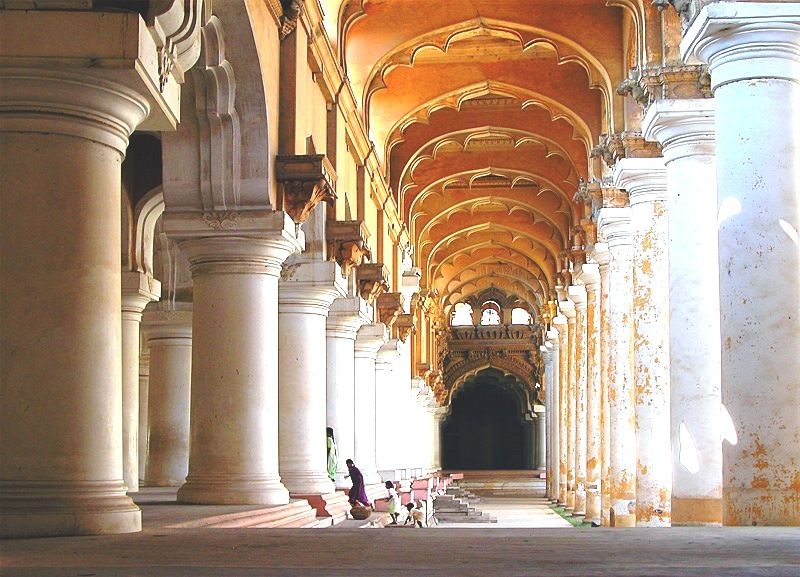
View of the corridor around the courtyard of the palace

Upon entering the gates of the palace, there is a central courtyard measuring 3,700 m^{2} (40,000 sq ft). This courtyard has a circular garden and is surrounded by massive circular pillars 82 feet (25 m) high and 19 feet (5.8 m) wide, for which the palace is famous.

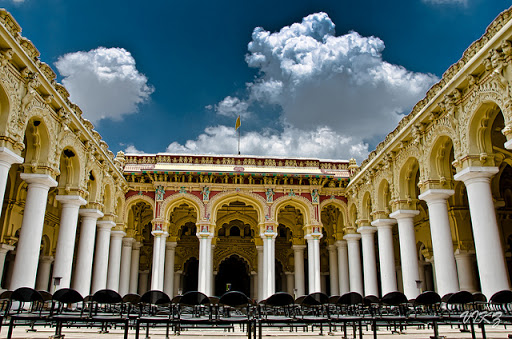
Inner view of Thirumalai Palace

The interior of the palace was divided into two major parts: the Swarga Vilasam (Celestial Pavilion) and the Ranga Vilasam, with the royal residence, theatre, shrine, apartments, armory, palanquin place, royal bandstand, quarters, pond, and garden all situated in these two portions. The Swarga Vilasam was used as the throne room and is an arcaded octagon-shaped structure covered by a dome 60 to 70 feet (18 to 21 m) high. This dome is supported by stone ribs and massive circular columns topped and linked by pointed, scalloped arches with an arcaded gallery opening into the nave above the side aisles. The courtyard of Svarga Vilasam measures 75 m (246 ft) by 50 m (160 ft), while its audience chamber is a vast hall with arcades about 12 m high.

== In popular culture ==
After independence the Thirumalai Palace was declared a national monument under the protection of the archaeological department of Tamil Nadu. It is open to visitors daily, with light and sound shows depicting the story of Silappathikaram playing in both the Tamil and English languages. Many films have been shot in the palace, including Bombay, Guru, and Bheema.
