= Tamukkam Palace =

Coordinates: 9.9310069°N 78.1325184°E

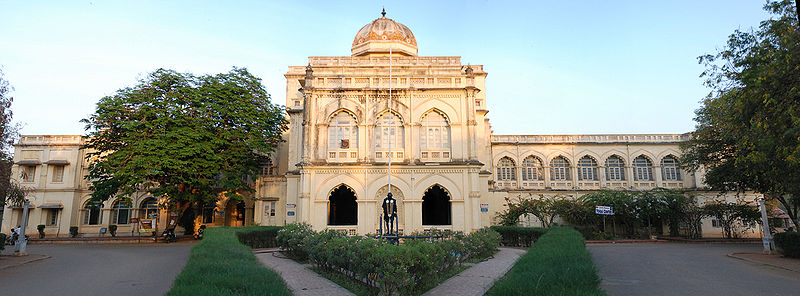
Queen's Summer Palace

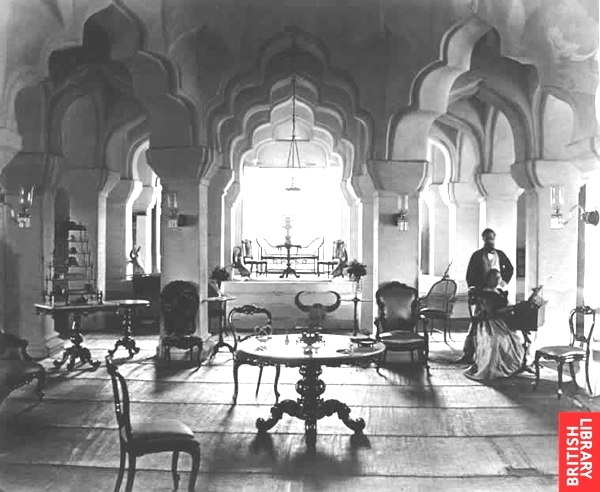
Queen's Summer Palace

Tamukkam Palace is a palace located in Madurai, Tamil Nadu, India. Literally the Tamil word Tamukkam (Tamil:தமுக்கம்) means summer house. It was built in c. 1670, and was the summer palace of Rani Mangammal, the queen regent of the Madurai Nayak kingdom. Taken over by the British, Tamukkam became the official residence of the District Collectors. It now houses the Mahatma Gandhi Museum.

== See also ==
- Tamukkam Maidanam (Ground)
