= Chokkanatha Nayak Palace =

Palace in Tiruchirapalli, Tamil Nadu, India

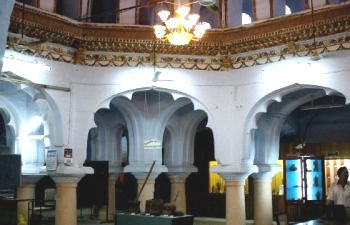

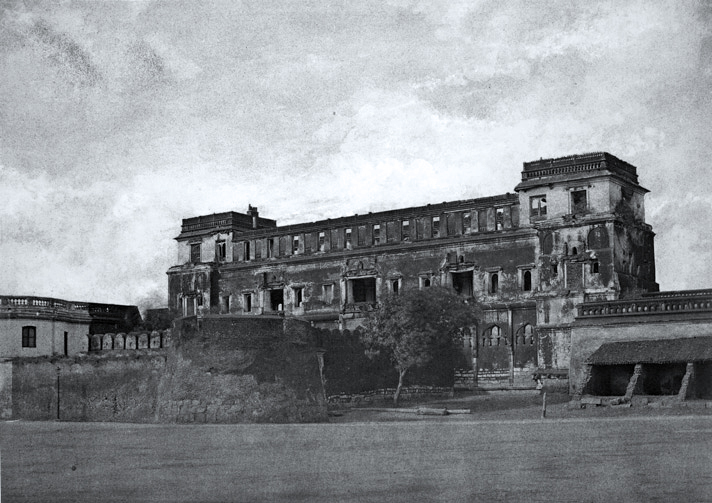
Chokkanatha Nayak Palace in the 19th century

The Chokkanatha Nayak Palace, now officially known as Rani Mangammal Mahal is a mid seventeenth century palace built by the Madurai Nayak rulers. It located in Tiruchirapalli, Tamil Nadu. at the base of the Tiruchirapalli Rock Fort. The palace was built by Chokkanatha Nayak, the then ruler of Madurai. It was also known as the Durbar Hall of the Madurai Nayaks when Tiruchirapally was their capital, from 1616 to 1634 and later from 1665 to 1736. Today the palace houses Government Museum and various state government offices around the palace complex.
