= Polygar =

Regional administrators of south India

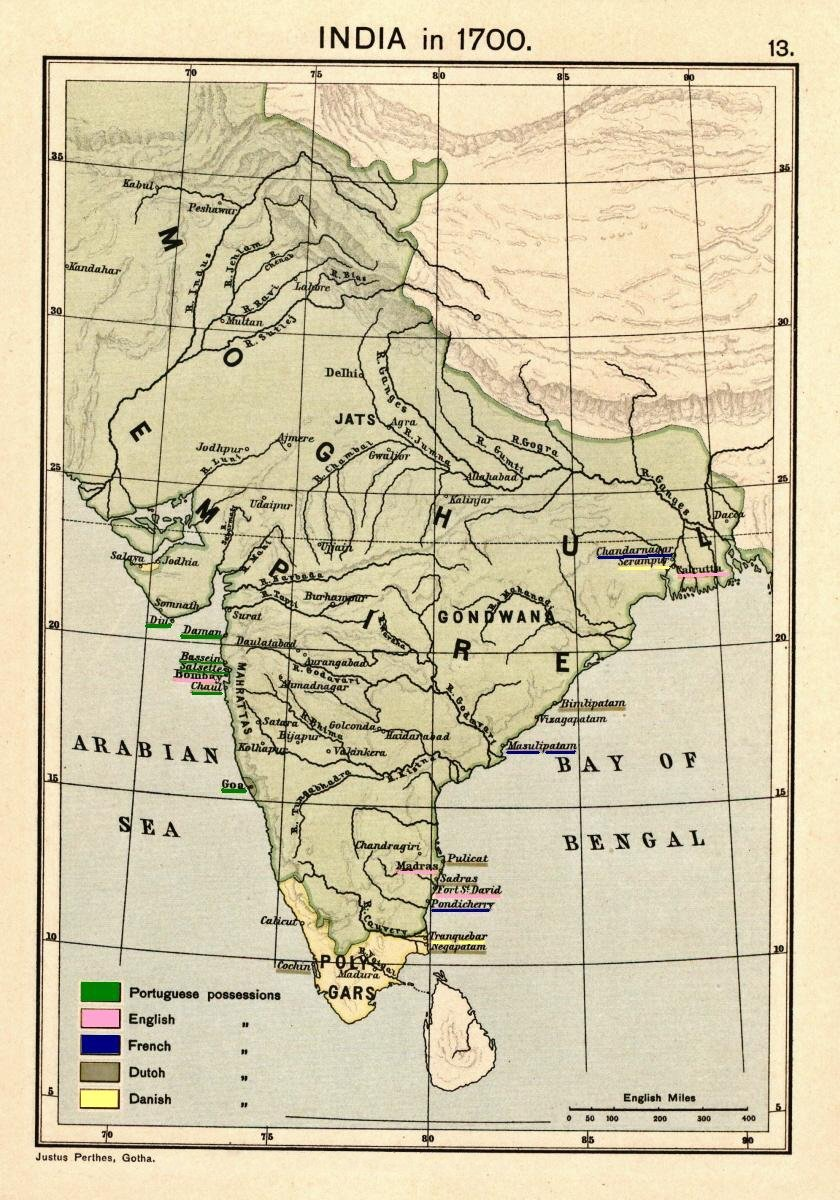
A 1700 AD map of India, showing the region ruled by the Palaiyakkarar in the south.

Palaiyakkarars (Tamil: [paːɭai̯jɐkːaːɾɐɾ]) or Poligar, Polygar or Palegara—literally 'ruler of a citadel' in Tamil, kannada, Telugu and Malayalam—were the traditional Dravidian establishment or warrior aristocracy of late medieval and Colonial South India. They were holders or rulers of a small kingdom as a feudatory to a greater sovereign. Under this system, a Palayam (fortified town) was given for valuable military services rendered by any individual. The word Pālayam means domain, a military camp, or a small kingdom.

This type of Palayakkarar system established a privileged social class, who exerted powerful influence over the political, economic and social life of pre-independence South India, in particular on colonial powers seeking control over the region. Their prominence and authority declined with the permanent settlement act of the British in the early nineteenth century, but their political, social and economic influence lasted till the end of the British Raj and the land reforms (1947-1950).

== Early History & Origins ==
This particular system was in practice during the rule of Pratapa Rudhra of Warangal in the Kakatiya kingdom. The system was put in place in Tamil Nadu by Viswanatha Nayak, when he became the Nayak ruler of Madurai in 1529, with the support of his minister Ariyanatha Mudaliar. Traditionally there were supposed to be 72 Palayakkarars. The majority of those Palaiyakkarar, who during the late 17th and 18th centuries controlled much of the Telugu region as well as the Tamil area, had themselves largely come from the Kallar, Maravar and Vatuka communities. Most palayakkars in western Tirunelveli and in Ramanathapuram were Maravar, those of Madurai, Tiruchi and Thanjavur Kallar, and those of eastern Tirunelveli, Dindigal and Coimbatore Nayak.

The Palaiyakkarar of Madurai Country were instrumental in establishing administrative reforms by building irrigation projects, forts and religious institutions. The Palaiyakkarar who worshipped the goddess Kali did not allow their territory to be annexed by Aurangzeb.

Their wars with the British East India Company after the demise of the Madurai Nayakas is often regarded as one of the earliest struggles for Indian independence. Many captured Palaiyakkarar commanders were either executed or banished to the Andaman Islands by the British. Puli Thevar, Veerapandya Kattabomman, the Marudu brothers, Maruthanayagam Pillai, Dheeran Chinnamalai, and Uyyalawada Narasimha Reddy, Maveeran Alagamuthu Kone were some notable Palaiyakkarars who rose up in revolt against the British rule in South India. Their wars against the British East India Company predates the Indian rebellion of 1857 in Northern India by many decades but is still largely given less importance by historians.

== Role ==
The Polygar's role was to administer their Palaiyams (territories) from their fortified centres. Their chief functions were to collect taxes, maintain law and order, run the local judiciary, and maintain a battalion of troops for the king.

They served as regional military and civil administrators. In turn they were to retain 1/4 of the revenue collected as tax, and submit the remaining to the king's treasury. The Polygars also at times founded villages, built dams, constructed tanks and built temples. The rulers taxed regions according to the cultivablity and fertility of the land. Often several new rainwater tanks were erected in the semi-arid tracts of western and southern Tamil Nadu.

Their armed status was also to protect the civilians from robbers and dacoits who were rampant in those regions during the waning of the Vijayanagara Empire's authority and from invading armies which often resorted to pillaging the villages and countryside.

== Polygar Wars ==
The Polygar Wars were a prominent series of wars fought by a coalition of Palaiyakkarar's against the British between 1798 and 1805 over the control of the Carnatic region. The war between the British and Veerapandiya Kattabomman is often classified as the First Polygar War (1799), while the Second Polygar War (1800–1805) against the British was fought by a much bigger coalition over the whole of western Tamil Nadu headed by Dheeran Chinnamalai and Maruthu Pandiyar, brother of the Sivaganga. A final Polygar War in 1847 against the British was fought by Uyyalawada Narasimha Reddy at Kovelakuntla (Koilakuntla)

The Polygars often had artillery and stubbornly resisted the storming of their hill forts. The British columns were exposed throughout the operations to constant harassing attacks and had usually to cut their way through almost impenetrable jungles while being fired on from under cover on all sides. It took more than a year to suppress the rebellion completely

After a long and expensive campaign the British East India Company finally defeated the rebelling Polygars, some of whom were executed while others were banished to the Andaman Islands. Of the Polygars who submitted to the British, some of them transitioned into working as Dubashes or were granted Zamindari status which had only tax collection rights and disarmed them completely.
