= Viswanatha Nayak =

Nayak of Madurai from 1529 to 1564

Garikepati Viswanatha Nayaka
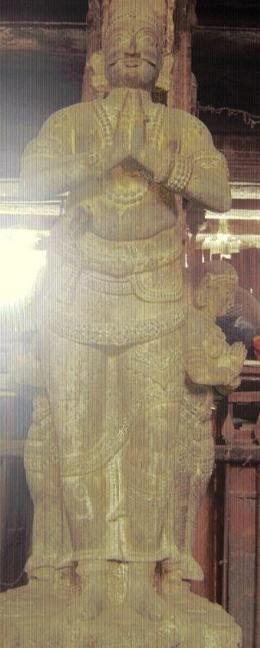
- King Viswanatha Nayak, Founder of Madurai Nayak Dynasty

Nayak of Madurai
- Reign: 1529–1564
- Predecessor: Position established
- Successor: Kumara Krishnappa Nayaka
- Died: Madurai (present-day Tamil Nadu, India)
- House: Madurai Nayaks
- Father: Nagama Nayaka

Viswanatha Nayaka (died 1564) was the Vijayanagara viceroy to Madurai in south India and later the ruler of Madurai from 1529 to 1564. He is the founder of the Nayak dynasty of Madurai. He hailed from the Garikepati family of Balija caste.

He was supported by his general Ariyanatha Mudaliar who led Viswanatha Nayak's army became second in command and took power along with the latter in Tirunelveli in southern India. Viswantha Nayak was then succeeded by his son Krishnappa Nayak who along with his father's able minister Ariyanatha expanded the Madurai Kingdom under the Nayaks and brought most of the ancient Pandyan territory under its rule.

== History ==
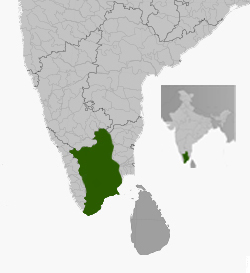
Madurai Nayak Kingdom

He was the son of Nagama Nayaka, the successful general of Krishnadevaraya in the Vijayanagara empire. In the early 16th century, the Chola ruler Veerasekara Chola invaded the Madurai country and deposed the Pandya king Chandrasekara Pandyan. The Pandya king was under the protection of the Vijayanagara empire and he appealed to the court of Vijayanagara, and an expedition under Kotikam Nagama Nayaka was sent to his aid. Nagama suppressed the Chola ruler and took Madurai, but then suddenly he threw off his allegiance and declining to help the Pandya king, usurped the throne. The Vijayanagara emperor demanded that someone cure the defection: Nagama's own son, Viswanatha, volunteered, and the king sent him with a large force against the rebel. He overthrew his father and handed him over to the emperor and as a reward for his loyalty the king appointed Viswanatha Nayaka as the governor of Madurai and other provinces in the Tamil country thus leading to formation of the Nayak Kingdom of Madurai in 1529.

The Nayaks protected the Madurai Kingdom from invasion of Mysore and Deccan sultans.

== Telugu film ==
This historical event was made as Telugu film in 1987 entitled Viswanatha Nayakudu under the direction of Dasari Narayana Rao.
