= Thanjavur Marathi people =

Ethnolinguistic group in Tamil Nadu, India

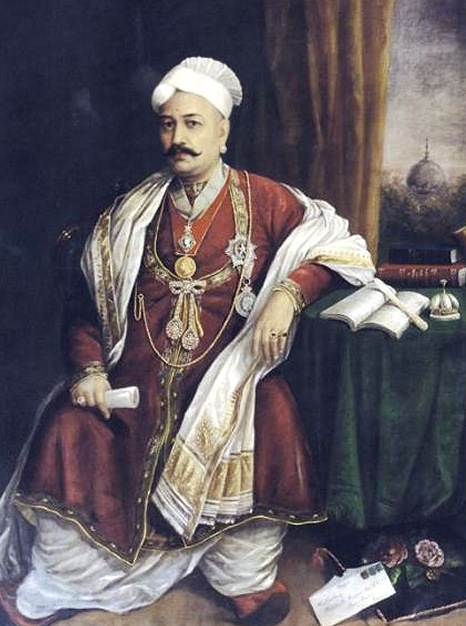
- Portrait of Sir T. Madhava Rao, a Thanjavur Maharashtrian of 19th Century

Total population
- ~70,000 (2001)

Regions with significant populations
- India (Tamil Nadu region of Chennai, Dharmapuri district, Kerala)

Languages
- Thanjavur Marathi, Tamil

Religion
- Hinduism

Related ethnic groups
- Marathi people, Deshasta Brahmin, Tamil people

Thanjavur Marathi people (colloquially called Rayar), are a Thanjavur Marathi-speaking ethno-linguistic group, who reside in the central and northern parts of the Indian state of Tamil Nadu. They are the descendants of Marathi administrators, soldiers and noblemen who migrated to this region during the rule of the Thanjavur Maratha kingdom. Thanjavur was a Maratha kingdom in Tamil Country, until the British East India Company dethroned the last Thanjavur Maratha king, Shivaji of Thanjavur. It was founded by Maratha Warrior King Chatrapati Shivaji's half-brother, Ekoji alias Venkoji Rajē Bhonsalē. The Kshatriyas use the term Maratha, while the Brahmins use the term Deshastha.

== Demographics and distribution ==
According to the 2001 census, Marathi is spoken as a mother tongue by about 0.1% of the total population of Tamil Nadu. Exact districtwise statistics are not available, but according to estimates, Marathi people are mostly concentrated in the city of Chennai and the Thanjavur, Nagapattinam, Dharmapuri, Tirupatttur, Krishnagiri, Vellore, Ranipet, Salem, Thiruvannamalai, Tiruvarur, Kanchipuram and Tiruchirappalli districts of Tamil Nadu. The Marathi population in Tamil Nadu has dwindled recently due to migrations to Maharashtra, Bangalore, North India and foreign countries.

== Language ==
The mother tongue of the Thanjavur Marathi people is Thanjavur Marathi, a Tamilized dialect of the Marathi language.

== Organizations ==
The Mahratta Education Fund (MEF) is a non-profit organisation for the education of poor Thanjavur Marathi students.

== In popular culture ==
- The fictitious RSS Swayamsevak Shriram Abhyankar, in the 1999 movie Hey Ram, played by Atul Kulkarni, is a Thanjavur Marathi person.

== Notable people ==
- Anandarayar Sahib, Diwan of the Thanjavur Maratha kingdom during the reigns of Shahuji I, Serfoji I and Tukkoji
- Reddy Row, Diwan of Travancore from 1817 to 1821 and 1843 to 1845.
- R. Venkata Rao, Diwan of Travancore from 1821 to 1829 and 1838 to 1839.
- Sir T. Madhava Rao (1828–1891), Diwan of Travancore from 1857 to 1872 and an early leader of the Indian National Congress. He was also Dewan of two other princely States, Indore & Baroda.
- Thanjavur Subha Rao, Diwan of Travancore in the 1830s.
- T. Rama Rao (1831–1895), Indian civil servant. Served as Diwan of Travancore from 1887 to 1892.
- T. Ananda Rao (1852–1919), Indian administrator. Diwan of Mysore from 1909 to 1912. Son of Sir T. Madhava Rao.
- V. P. Madhava Rao (1850–1934), Indian administrator. Diwan of Mysore from 1906 to 1909 and Baroda from 1910 to 1913.
- N. Vittal (born 31 January 1938), belonging to the Indian Administrative Service 1960 batch, is one of the eminent public servants of India, who has held important positions in the Government of India, most prominent of which was that of the Central Vigilance Commissioner.
- T. Gopala Rao (1832–1886), Indian educator. Was one of the pioneers of Government Arts College, Kumbakonam. Gopal Rao Public Library in Kumbakonam is named after him.
- Palladam Sanjiva Rao (1882–1962), Indian flautist and carnatic musician.
- R. Balaji Rao (1842–1896), Indian politician and Indian independence activist. First Secretary of the Madras Mahajana Sabha. Represented Tanjore along with S. A. Swaminatha Iyer at the first session of the Indian National Congress.
- R. Raghunatha Rao (1831–1912), Indian civil servant, administrator, politician and Indian independence activist. Diwan of Indore 1875–88.
- K. Krishnaswamy Rao (1845–1923), Diwan of Travancore 1898–1904.
- R. Ramachandra Rao (1871–1936), Indian civil servant and Indian independence activist. Served as District Collector of Kurnool, Nellore and Madras.
- T. Ramachandra Rao (1825–1879), First Deputy Commissioner of Police, Madras.
- C. R. Krishnaswamy Rao Sahib, IAS ( 1927– 2013) a distinguished administrator and civil servant who was awarded the Padma Vibhushan in 2008. Krishnaswamy Rao Saheb distinguished himself by becoming the Principal Secretary to Prime Minister Charan Singh and then becoming the Cabinet Secretary when Indira Gandhi became the Prime Minister.
- Sundar Narayana Rao, Reputed singer from Chennai, Tamil Nadu

== See also ==
- Saurashtra people
- Dravid (surname)
