= Anandarayar Sahib =

Anandarayar Sahib was a poet and administrator who served as a minister in the courts of the Thanjavur Maratha kings Shahuji I, Serfoji I and Tukkoji. He was given the honorific title "Peshwa".

== Biography ==
Anandarayar Sahib hailed from a prominent Deshastha Brahmin family of the Thanjavur Maratha kingdom. He was dharmadhikari during the reign of Shahuji I and dalavoy in the reign of his successor Serfoji I.

Anandarayar Sahib is mentioned in literary works as "Aiyavayyan". He is credited with having duggen a canal called "Aiyavayyanaru" and dedicated agraharams as Mangamatam and Sarabhojirajapuram.

== Military Campaigns ==
Anandarayar led the Thanjavur Maratha forces during the Ramnad war of succession in support of Bhavani Sankar.

== Literary works ==
There are a number of literary works attributed to Anandarayar Sahib or dedicated to him. Anandarayar composed two works, one in Tamil (Advaita Kirtana) and another in Sanskrit (Sarabhoji Charitra).

== Later years ==
While some sources claim that Anandarayar Sahib fell out of favour with the king and was thrown in jail where he died broken-hearted, others claim that Seroji later pardoned the minister who retired to Thiruvenkadu where he died.
