= Pratap Singh of Thanjavur =

Raja of Thanjavur Maratha kingdom from 1739–1763

Pratap Singh
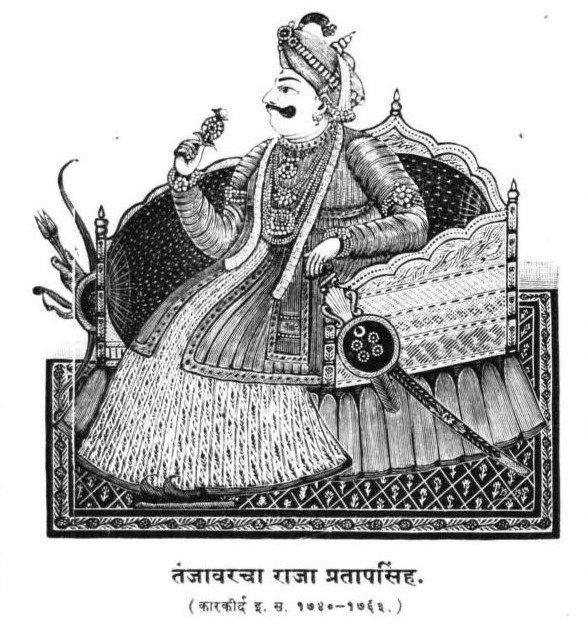
- Pratap Singh Bhonsle

Raja of Thanjavur
- Reign: 1739 - 16 December 1763
- Coronation: 1739, Durbar Hall, Tanjore Fort
- Predecessor: Shahuji II
- Successor: Thuljaji II
- Died: 16 December 1763; Tanjore Fort
- Spouse: Five wives and seven secondary wives
- Issue: Thuljaji II; Amar Singh
- Dynasty: Bhonsle
- Father: Tukkoji
- Mother: Annapurna
- Religion: Hinduism
- Military career
- Conflicts: Carnatic wars: Siege of Arcot; Battle of Arnee; Battle of Seringham; Siege of Trichinopoly; Cattle War Anglo-Maratha Wars: Siege of Tanjore; Thanjavur–Ramnad Wars

Pratap Singh Bhonsle or Pratapsinha (Marathi: तंजावरचे प्रतापसिंह) was the Maratha ruler of Thanjavur of the Bhonsle dynasty from 1739 to 1763. His rise to power followed three years of anarchy and civil war and restored the state to its previous greatness. His reign witnessed the Carnatic Wars and the Seven Years' War.

== Early life ==
Pratapsinha was born to Tukkoji, the Raja of Thanjavur and a concubine Annapurna. Initially, he was not expected to rule as he was not a legitimate son of the Raja. However, the early demise of the king's eldest son Ekoji II who died after ruling Thanjavur for a year and a period of anarchy which followed thrust Pratap Singh on the forefront of palace intrigues.

== Period of Anarchy 1736–1739 ==
Following Tukkoji's death in 1736, a period of anarchy followed. Ekoji, the king's eldest son and heir apparent succeeded to the throne but died after ruling Thanjavur for a year. However, in spite of his poor health, Ekoji offered a determined resistance to Chanda Sahib who invaded Thanjavur during the former's short reign and forced him to retreat to Tiruchirapalli.

Ekoji died in 1737 succeeded by his wife Sujana Bai. Sayyid, the Governor of the Thanjavur Fort, rose into prominence during this period as a kingmaker and actively participated in court intrigues promoting one puppet ruler after another to the throne. He imprisoned Sujanbai in 1738 when the latter questioned his authority.

Shahuji returned in 1738 and ruled for about a year. In February 1739, Chanda Sahib forced Shahuji to cede Karaikal to the French and in April, the Raja confirmed the Grant. In July 1739, Shahuji prevented the French from landing in Karaikal. This resulted in invasion of Thanjavur by Chanda Sahib who captured Shahuji and imprisoned him on the pretext that he was not the actual Shahuji but an impostor. The Dutch East India Company based at Nagapattinam sent home the following report on the events at Thanjavur:

Chanda imprisoned Shahuji Maharaj in Tanjore under a pretext that he was not of royal blood. Pratap was placed on the throne against his own will. Having gone to prison and expressing his unwillingness to ascend the throne to Shagy's prejudice, Pratap was answered by Shagy, "If you do not accept the Government, both of us lose our heads, if, on the other hand, we continue alive, we may watch the course of events. Hence ascend the throne"

== Reign ==
Pratapsinha ascended the throne in 1739. He was the last ruler of Thanjavur to be referred in the official records of the English East India Company as "His Majesty". His court was noted for its patronage of the arts notably of the devadasi/poetess Muddupalani.

As soon as Pratapsinha ascended the throne he had to contend with the intrigues of the pretender Shahuji in the company of a treacherous Maratha noble Koyaji Kattigai. It was also evident that the conspirators were in league with Sayyid. So immediately after ascending the throne, Pratapsingh ordered the death of Sayyid.

In 1748, the pretender Shahuji sent an envoy, first to Puducherry and then to Fort St. David to negotiate terms of alliance with the French East India Company. The British East India Company initially supported Pratapsingh but switched sides when Shahuji offered the fort of Devikottai at the mouth of the Coleroon river. The British sent two expeditions against Devikkottai which was defended by a garrison of 5,000 men. Their first attempt was a complete failure while the second ended in a truce. The second expedition was remarkable as the one in which Lawrence and Clive distinguished themselves. The War was brought to an end by the treaty of friendship between Pratapsingh and the Company. Devikkottai was made over to the English as per the provisions of the treaty.

In the early part of his reign, Pratapsinha also had to deal with the imperious attitude of Dost Ali, the Nawab of the Carnatic. Pratapsinha was soon deposed by Dost Ali who took over the administration of Thanjavur. But a Maratha invasion from the north brought about the death of Dost Ali and the restoration of Pratapsingh. The Maratha troops left after making one Murari Rao Ghorpade the ruler of Tiruchirapalli, with whom Pratapsinha was on bad terms. Soon afterwards, the Nizam of Hyderabad sent a formidable force to Thanjavur to exact tribute. Two other expeditions forced the Raja into submission.

The third and final expedition of the Nizam of Hyderabad in 1742, resulted in the deposition of Murari Rao and the annexation of Tiruchirapalli. As a result of this campaign, Thanjavur was forced to become a vassal of Hyderabad and pay annual tribute.

=== The Seven Years' War ===
During the Seven Years' War, Pratapsingh supported the English with arms and supplies. At Lawrences' behest, the great Thanjavur general Manoji took Coillady from the French and captured Chanda Sahib and beheaded him.

However, the confederacy broke when Nanja Raja realized that he had been deceived by Muhammad Ali who had promised to give him Tiruchirapalli as per an early arrangement. Pratapsingh supported his cause when the French under Dupleix tried to threaten him. Muhammad Ali and Murari Rao forged an alliance with the French.

In 1758, Lally marched to Thanjavur from Karaikal in order to force Thanjavur into subjugation but was repulsed by Manoji. He had to retreat with an insignificant plunder at Nagore when an English fleet made its appearance off the coast at Karaikal. The Thanjavur troops supported by a small English contingent harassed the French who eventually succumbed to starvation. The British inflicted a crshing defeat on the French in the siege of Puducherry in 1761. This dealt a death-blow to the French power in India.

=== Loss of Independence ===
From the onset, the Nawab of Carnatic Muhammad Ali Khan Wallajah wasn't in good terms with Pratap Singh and desired to annex Thanjavur. However, for the sake of their common interests, Pratap Singh maintained an uneasy alliance with Muhammad Ali. Matters reached a boiling point after the Seven Years' War. The Carnatic Sultanate was getting ready for plans to attack the Thanjavur Maratha kingdom. However, their common ally, the British East India Company, averted a crisis by stepping in to mediate a truce in 1762. The Raja agreed to pay twenty lakhs as arrears and an annual tribute of four lakhs to the Nawab of Carnatic. In return, Coiladdy and Yelengadu were ceded to Thanjavur. Notwithstanding allegations of partiality on part of the British, this treaty practically ended Thanjavur's independence.

=== Border disputes with Ramnad ===
There were frequent border disputes with the state of Ramnad on the Aranthangi frontier. Actively supported by the Tondaiman of Pudukkottai, Manoji once led a large army into the territory of the Sethupathy of Ramnad and even captured Aranthangi. The Nawab of Carnatic who was the actual overlord to whom Thanjavur paid tribute, stepped in and stopped the Raja from pursuing further hostilities.

== Death ==
Pratapsinha died on 16 December 1763 after reigning for 24 years. His third and fifth queens committed Sati. He was succeeded by his eldest son Thuljaji.

== See also ==
- Bhonsle
- Maratha Empire
- List of Maratha dynasties and states
- Thanjavur Maratha kingdom
- Seven Years' War
- Nawab of Carnatic

== Notes ==
Preceded by Shahuji II	Maratha Raja of Thanjavur; 1739–1763	Succeeded by Thuljaji
