= Shahuji II =

Raja of Thanjavur Maratha kingdom from 1738 to 1739

Raja of Thanjavur
- Reign: 1738 to 1739
- Predecessor: Sujanbai
- Successor: Pratapsingh
- House: Bhonsle
- Father: Serfoji I
- Religion: Hinduism

Shahuji II Bhonsle of Katturaja of the Bhonsle dynasty was the name of the ruler of Thanjavur from 1738 to 1739 who rose to power based on the unverified claim of being an illegitimate son of Serfoji I.

== Rise to Power ==
Ever since the death of Serfoji I, Shahuji II desired to occupy the throne. However, on Serfoji I's death in 1728, throne passed on to his younger brother Tukkoji. Not until the death of Tukkoji in 1736 was Katturaja able to place his claim on the throne. Katturaja did not make any claim to the throne during the short rule of Ekoji II but during the rule of his wife Sujanbai he superseded the former in power. Soon he was driven out and approached the French for help. Meanwhile, the cunning court-official Sayid imprisoned Sujanbai and impaled her favorite minister Siddoji thereby enabling Katturaja to take power in 1738.

== Reign ==
Katturaja ascended the throne as Sawai Shahuji or Shahuji II and ruled for about a year. In February 1739, Chanda Sahib forced the Raja to cede Karaikal to the French and in April 1739, Shahuji II confirmed the grant. However, in July 1739, Shahuji II tried his best to prevent the French from landing in Karaikal. This alienated the French. Shahuji II approached the Dutch of Negapatam and the English of Fort St David for help but to no avail. Chanda Sahib invaded Thanjavur and deposed the Raja on the basis of the new discovery that Katturaja was the son of a washerwoman at the Fort and not the queen herself.

With Thanjavur in the enemy's hands, there was no ruler in Thanjavur. Pratapsingh was reluctant to lay his claim on the throne. However, Katturaja exhorted him to lead from the front. He wrote a letter to Pratapsingh:

If you do not accept the Government, both of us lose our heads, if, on the other hand, we continue alive, we may watch the course of events. Hence ascend the throne.

Pratapsingh accepted Shahuji II's request and ascended the throne in 1739.

== Later life ==
Shahuji II lived for a fair part of Pratapsingh's reign. During the early part of Pratapsingh's reign, he intrigued along with Chanda Sahib, Koyyaji Kattigai and the powerful court-official Sayyid in order to capture the throne. Sayyid was captured and killed on the orders of the Raja.

Preceded by {{{before}}}	Maratha Ruler of Thanjavur has been deleted.	Succeeded by {{{after}}}
