= Madurai Invasion of Thanjavur (1700–1701) =

- Part of Madurai- Maratha Conflicts
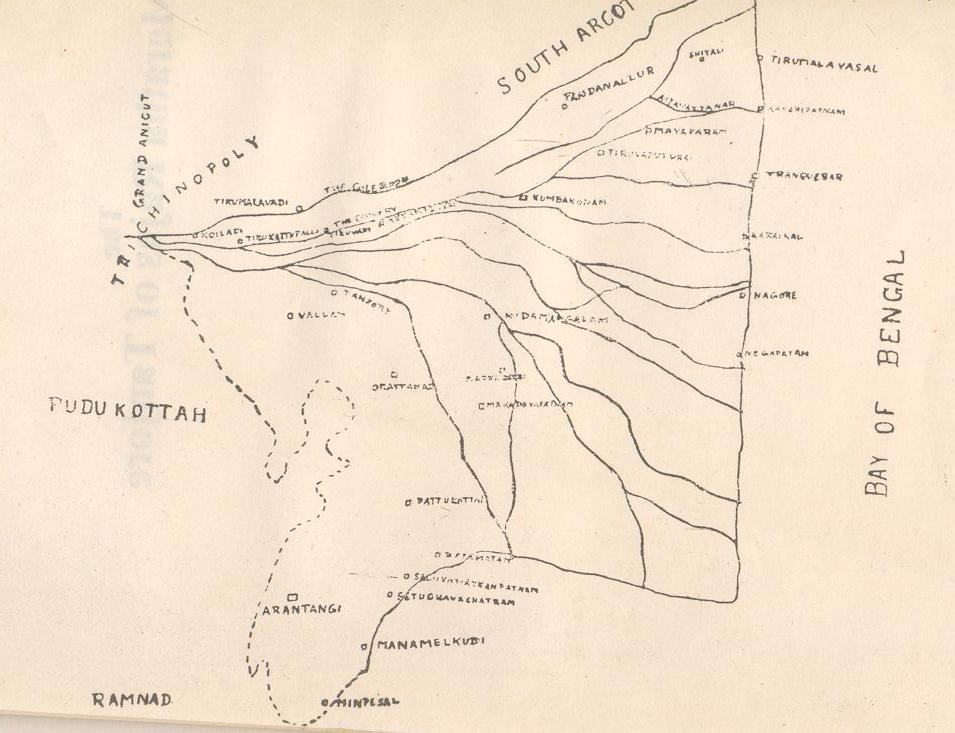
- Map of the Thanjavur Maratha kingdom
| Date | 1700–1701 |
| Location | Thanjavur, India |
| Result | Madurai Nayakas victory |

Belligerents
| Madurai Nayaks | Thanjavur Marathas; Supported by: Kingdom of Ramnad |

Commanders and leaders
| Mangammal; Narasappaiya | Shahuji I (surrendered); Baloji Pant (surrendered) |

Strength
| Unknown | Unknown |

Casualties and losses
| Moderate | Heavy |

The Madurai invasion of Thanjavur (1700–1701) took place during the rule of Mangammal, the queen-regent of Madurai. Tensions had grown between Madurai Nayakas and the Thanjavur Maratha Kingdom under Shahuji I, mainly because of border disputes and repeated raids into Madurai territory. Mangammal therefore ordered her general Narasappaiya to march against Thanjavur. The Madurai army crossed the rivers and entered the Tanjore kingdom defeating the enemy forces in the banks of Coleroon River and causing heavy damage to the countryside. the conflict eventually ended through negotiation after large payments were offered to stop the invasion. The Madurai army then withdrew toward Tiruchirappalli bringing the Invasion to an end.

== Background ==
After making peace with Ravi Varma of Travancore, Mangammal, the queen-regent of Madurai turned her attention toward Thanjavur. The Maratha ruler Shahuji I of Thanjavur had slowly begun to encroach upon the territories of the Madurai kingdom. Several villages along the banks of the Kaveri River were taken under his control, and his forces often carried out raids into Madurai lands to collect plunder. The watchful Raghunatha Raya Tondaiman and the Setupati of Ramnad managed to stop many of these invasions, but the attacks continued. Mangammal was not willing to tolerate this situation any longer. Soon after her general Narasappaiya returned from his campaign in Travancore she ordered him to prepare for war against Thanjavur Marathas.

== Invasion ==
=== Battle of Coleroon River ===
The Madurai general Narasappaiya first took a strong defensive position on the northern bank of the Coleroon River to stop the Tanjore army from invading and destroying the countryside. However, he soon realized that the enemy’s skilled cavalry tactics made it difficult to defeat them by defense alone. Deciding to take the initiative Narasappaiya secretly crossed the river and began attacking and raiding the lands of Thanjavur Marathas. This sudden move surprised the Tanjore forces. In their hurry to respond the Tanjore army tried to cross the river but chose a dangerous spot when the river was in full flood. Many soldiers and horses were swept away by the strong current causing confusion and panic in their ranks. At that moment, Narasappaiya launched an attack on the disorganized army and defeated them. Large parts of the Thanjavur Maratha Kingdom were devastated.

After the defeat of the Tanjore forces Shahuji I believed that the disaster had happened because of the negligence of his minister Baloji Pandit. Shahuji I blamed him for the situation and angrily threatened him with death if the enemy army was allowed to continue its advance. Baloji Pandit then promised that he would stop the enemy and force them to return to Tiruchirappalli within a week. Instead of raising a new army the clever minister decided to use a different plan. He believed that money could influence the leaders of the Madurai kingdom. Therefore, he tried to persuade Mangammal and her general Narasappaiya to make peace by offering large sums of money and valuable gifts.

== Aftermath ==
The plan of Baloji Pandit first faced a serious problem because the treasury of Thanjavur was almost empty and Shahuji I was not willing to provide the large amount of money needed. But the minister was determined to save himself and the kingdom. To gather the required wealth heavy pressure was placed on the people. Poor villagers were forced to give up their small savings and merchants were threatened until they handed over their profits. With this money, Baloji Pandit began to win over the leaders of Madurai. The queen Mangammal was satisfied with a large war indemnity of about five lakh coins and her ministers also received generous rewards. Even the father of the Madurai general Narasappaiya who was known for his strong love of wealth was fully pleased. As a result, the Madurai army soon stopped its advance and within a week began its return march to Tiruchirappalli.

== See also ==
- Zulfikar Khan
- Shahuji I
- Chokkanatha Nayak
