= Tanjore (disambiguation) =

Tanjore is the anglicised name of Thanjavur, a city in Tamil Nadu, India

Tanjore may also refer to:

- Tanjore painting, which originated in Thanjavur
- Tanjore Nayaks, the rulers of Thanjavur between 16th and 19th century C.E
- Tanjore Maharashtrian community
- Thanjavur Marathi (disambiguation)
- Tanjore, a special Air India aircraft which carries the President of India and the Prime Minister of India
- Tanjore Ranganathan, a carnatic musician
- Edward Tanjore Corwin, an American writer
