= Dhundhiraja of Svamimalai =

Dhundhi-raja (IAST: Ḍhuṇḍhirāja), also known as Ḍhuṇḍhi Vyāsa, was an 18th-century Sanskrit writer from Varanasi, who settled in the Thanjavur Maratha kingdom of present-day Tamil Nadu, India. He is noted for writing a commentary on Mudra-rakshasa (1713 CE) and an adaptation of Gita-govinda.

== Biography ==
Dhundhi-raja was also known as Dhundhi-raja-vyasa-yajvan or Dhundhi-raja-yajvan, yajvan being the title accorded to a person who had performed a ritual sacrifice (yajna). King Shahaji I gave him the title Abhinava-Jayadeva ("the new Jayadeva") for writing Shaha-vilasa-gita, a free adaptation of Jayadeva's Gita-govinda.

Dhundhi-raja was a Marathi-speaking brahmin, originally from Varanasi. His father's name was Lakshmana-vyasa alias Lakshmana-sudhi. In the Thanjavur Maratha kingdom, Dhundhi-raja resided at Svamimalai near Thanjavur. His patrons included several members of the Thanjavur court, including the kings Shahaji I and Serfoji I, as well as the ministers Tryambaka and Raghunatha. He describes himself as a pauranika (Purana story-teller) of Shahaji.

Dhundhi-raja had a son named Balakrishna, and a grandson named Shankara-dikshita, who composed Pradyumna-vijaya.

== Works ==
- Shaha-vilasa-gita or Shaha-vilasa-gitam (IAST: Śāhavilāsagīta or Śāhavilāsagītam), a poem adapted from Gita-govinda. It celebrates the love between king Shahaji I and a courtesan.
- Mudra-rakshasa-vyakhya (IAST: Mudrārākṣasavyakhya), a commentary on Mudrarakshasa

The introductory verses in Dhundhi-raja's Mudra-rakshasa-vyakhya are same as those of his patron Tryambaka's Dharmākūta: it is possible that Tryambaka took these verses from Dhundhi-raja's work. Alternative theories ascribe the authorship of Mudra-rakshasa-vyakhya to Tryambaka or the authorship of Dharmākūta to Dhundhi-raja.
