= Serugudi, Tiruvarur =

Serugudi is a village in the Kudavasal taluk of Tiruvarur district in Tamil Nadu, India. It is known for the Serugudi Sukshmapureeswarar Temple.

== Location ==
The village is located on the Kumbakonam-Karaikal road near Sarabhojirajapuram.

== Demographics ==
As of 2001 census, the village had a population of 1,118 with 573 men and 545 women. The sex ratio was 951. The literacy rate was 72.26.
