= Tryambaka-yajvan =

Tryambaka-yajvan (1665-1750), also known as Tryambaka-raya-makhin, was a Hindu pandit and a minister at the court of the Thanjavur Maratha kings Shahaji I and Serfoji I. He is best known for writing Strī-dharma-paddhati - a treatise that describes the duties of the ideal Hindu woman from an orthodox point of view, and Dharmākūta - a commentary on Ramayana.

== Biography ==
Tryambaka lived during 1665–1750, and came from a family of pandit-ministers. His original surname was Abhyankar and they were Chitpavan Brahmins. His great-grandfather, his father as well as his son were named Gangadhara. His family tree is given below:

- Ganga-dhara I
  - Bavaji
    - Ganga-dhara II alias Kakoji (married Krishnamba), minister to Ekoji I
      - Nrsimha-raya I, minister to Ekoji I
        - Ananda-raya, minister to Shahaji and Serfoji
          - Nrsimha-raya II
      - Tryambaka-raya, minister to Shahaji I and Serfoji I
          - Ganga-dhara III
            - Narayana-raya
      - Bhagavanta-raya, minister to Tukkoji

Tryambaka was also known as Trymbaka-yavjan, Tryambaka-makhin, Trymabaka-raya, Tryambaka-raya-makhin, or Tryambaka Raya Makhi. The Sanskrit titles yajvan and makhin are synonymous, and probably commemorate a ritual sacrifice (yajna) performed by him; the Rāghavābhyudaya of Bhagavanta-rāya describes this sacrifice.

Tryambaka states that Ekoji I - the founder of the Thanjavur Maratha kingdom - trained him to be the minister of the succeeding ruler Shahaji I.

According to Ayyaval's Shahendra-vilasa, Tryambaka was a learned minister of Shahaji, a perform of Vedic sacrifices, and a patron of scholars. The next ruler, Serfoji I, commissioned him to write Dharmākūta, a commentary on the epic Ramayana. In this commentary, Tryambaka explains how the Ramayana story is consistent with the traditional religious law.

Trymabaka's family members also wrote several works under the Thanjavur Maratha patronage. His grandson Narayana-raya wrote Vikrama-sena-champu. His brother Bhagavanta-raya wrote Mukunda-vilasa, Uttara-champu, and Raghavabhyudaya. His nephew Ananda-raya wrote Ashvala-yana-grhya-sutra-vritti, Jivananda-nataka, and Vidya-parinaya-nataka (with a commentary). His grand-nephew Nrsimha-raya wrote Tripura-vijaya-champu.

== Works ==
Tryambaka wrote the following Sanskrit-language works:

- Strī-dharma-paddhati, a treatise on the duties of women from an orthodox Hindu point of view
- Gārhasthya-dīpikā
- Dharmākūta or Dharmākūtam (1719), an encyclopedic commentary on the Ramayana

Some earlier scholars believed that the authors of these three texts were distinct people. However, literary evidence makes it clear that all three works were composed by the same work. The colophons of Strī-dharma-paddhati and Gārhasthya-dīpikā both mention the author's name as Tryambaka-yajvan, the author of Yajnesha. Dharmākūta is attributed to Tryambaka-raya-makhin. The author of Strī-dharma-paddhati quotes Dharmākūta, stating that it was written by him. Moreover, the Dharmākūta mentions that the author was a pupil of Yajnesha.

Tryambaka patronized the court poet and pandit Dhundhi-raja. The introductory verses in Dhundhi-raja's Mudra-rakshasa-vyakhya are same as those of Dharmākūta: it is possible that Tryambaka took these verses from Dhundhi-raja's work. Alternative theories ascribe the authorship of Mudra-rakshasa-vyakhya to Tryambaka or the authorship of Dharmākūta to Dhundhi-raja.
