= Sigri =

Sigri may refer to:

- Sigri (village), Lesbos, Greece
- Sigri (stove)
- Sigri (coffee), a coffee brand in Papua New Guinea
