= Raja of Tanjore =

The Raja of Tanjore is a title pertaining to two distinct South Indian dynasties:

- Thanjavur Nayak kingdom (1532–1673)
- Thanjavur Maratha kingdom (1674–1855)
