= Thanjavur Marathi dialect =

Dialect of Marathi spoken by Thanjavur Maharathis

Thanjavur Marathi
- Native to: India
- Region: Tamil Nadu
- Native speakers: (undated figure of 100,000)
- Language family: Indo-European: Indo-Iranian; Indo-Aryan; Southern Zone; Marathi; Thanjavur Marathi

Language codes
- ISO 639-3: –

Thanjavur Marathi (Marathi: तंजावूर मराठी), also spelled as Tanjore Marathi, is a dialect of Marathi spoken by Thanjavur Marathi people who migrated south, along with Chhatrapati Shivaji's half brother Venkoji, to the areas surrounding the city of Thanjavur in Tamil Nadu, India back in the 17th century.

== History ==
The history of Maratha rulers in South India possibly begins with Shahaji's attempt at setting up an independent kingdom in the Deccan plateau and his subsequent defeat in battle by Shahjahan around 1636. Shahaji made peace with Shahjahan and was posted in the deep south so as not to pose any challenge to the Mughals. He finally became one of the top generals in Adilshah's army, accepting a Jagir in his court, being based in Bengaluru. Shahaji had two sons by Jijabai, Sambhaji and Shivaji and one son Venkoji (also Vyankoji or Ekoji) by his second wife, Tukabai. Venkoji later ruled over the independent Maratha kingdom of Thanjavur which came to be known as the Thanjavur Maratha Kingdom. Serfoji I is among the most famous Marathi kings of Tanjore.

== Scripts ==
Historically Modi, Devanagari, Telugu and Tamil scripts have been used to write this dialect as found in old historical documents.

== Illustration ==
Examples of colloquial speech
| Tanjore Marathi | Standard Marathi(colloquial) | Translation |
|---|---|---|
| namaśkāra | namaskār | hello/greetings |
| kaśa āyēnta/āhēsa/hāysa? | kase/kasa ahāt/āhēs/āhāt? | How are you? |
| mī bēś hāy | mī ṭhīk āhē | I am fine |
| lai bēś hāy | khūp chhān āhē | (It) is very nice/beautiful. |
| wōy ka nai ka? | hō kā nāhi? | yes or no? |
| tumchya gharānt kewda pōri hāyt? | tumcyā gharī kitī mule āhēt? | How many girls are there in your house (at the moment)? |
| ghaṇṭā kewda jhālāy/hōlēy? | kitī wājalē? | What is the time? |
| yejā/hecha mōl kewda/kaya ? | (h)yācā bhāv kāy? | How much is this for? |
| dāwa/ujwa pāṭīs | ḍāwyā/ujwyā bājū lā | toward left/right |
| kemma/kevva panā | kadhīhī | always, whenever |
| rāndhthēghar / sampakkholi | swayampākaghar | kitchen |
| bāsna | bhāndī | vessels |
| ruppēcha | chāndīchā/ī/ē | made of silver |
| kānkna | bāngdyā | bangles |
| pativuka? | pāthavū? | should i send? |
| Nankaar | nakhabhar | a little bit, small amount, a pinch |
| Vijana | paṅkhā | Handfan |
| Dhonda | dagaḍ | Large Stone |
