= Strī-dharma-paddhati =

Strī-dharma-paddhati is an 18th-century Sanskrit-language text written by the court pandit Tryambaka-yajvan in the Thanjavur Maratha kingdom of present-day Tamil Nadu, India. It outlines the duties of women from an orthodox Hindu point of view, based on several shruti, smriti, and puranic texts. A strongly patriarchal text, it assigns a subservient role to women, and suggests that they can achieve salvation only through complete devotion to their husbands. Like the dharma-shastra texts it quotes, the norms presented in the text are a mixture of contemporary social reality and what the author considers to be the ideal behavior.

== Authorship and date ==
Tryambaka-yajvan, the writer of Strī-dharma-paddhati ("Guide to the Religious Status and Duties of Women"), was an orthodox pandit from Thanjavur. He was a pupil of Yajnesha (IAST: Yajñeśa), and a court pandit and minister of the Thanjavur Maratha king Serfoji I.

The text does not mention the exact date of its composition, but quotes Dharmākūta (1719), another work by Tryambakayajvan. The author died in 1750, so Strī-dharma-paddhati must have been composed sometime between 1719 and 1750 CE.

== Contents ==
=== Introduction ===
At the beginning of the text, Tryambaka invokes Ganadhipati, Sarasvati, and his teachers. The text focuses on married women, and Tryambaka declares that the primary religious duty of women is to obediently serve their husbands. He states that he has compiled sacred laws related to women from various texts including the law books (dhrama-shastras) and the Puranas.

=== The daily duties of women ===
Tryambaka divides the night (and presumably the day) into six periods, and specifies various activities that the women should engage during each period. In the morning, a woman is expected to rise before her husband (who, according to the six-fold division of night, is expected to rise at 4 am).

In addition to several duties traditionally prescribed for men (such as personal hygiene), Tryambaka assigns various household tasks to women, such as food preparation, house cleaning, smearing the house with cow dung, tending to her children, tending to the cows, and massaging her husband.

A woman is also expected to perform ritual worship of threshold (including sketching of auspicious designs), and assist her husband in performing ritual sacrifices. According to Tryambaka, a wife should worship only three deities: her husband, and the two sister goddesses - Shri (Lakshmi) and Jyestha (Alakshmi).

When the husband eats, the wife is expected to serve him, and eat his leftovers. At night, she is expected to engage in sexual intercourse. Several of these duties, including a variety of sex positions, are illustrated in the book's palm-leaf manuscripts, now at the British Library.

Tryambaka does not make any provisions for a woman to rest, and lists day-time sleep among the things that corrupt women (and therefore should be avoided). Women are not expected to visit friends or study.

Tryambaka provides detailed instructions for several daily tasks. For example, he quotes Angiras' instructions on urinating and defecating:

Rising in the last division of night, one should sip water and cover the ground with grass. Then, in a clean place, with concentrated mind, covering one's head with one's garment, and resolutely refraining from speech, spitting and breathing (out), one should urinate and defecate.

— Strī-dharma-paddhati, quoting Aṅgiraḥ-smṛti

He gives several modifying rules for tasks common to men and women. For example, he quotes Shankha for instructions on dressing:

(A woman) should not show her navel; she should wear garments that extend to her ankles; and she should not expose her breasts.

— Strī-dharma-paddhati, quoting Śaṅkha-smṛti

He also provides different rules for menstruating women and widows. For example, these women (and women whose husbands are away) should avoid ornaments, flowers and other things that make them attractive.

The text states a woman should not answer back if her husband scolds her, or show anger and resentment if her husband beats her. The only exception is love-making, during which it is acceptable for a woman to strike her husband, scratch him, show anger towards him, or use harsh words as an expression of her passion.

=== The inherent nature of women ===
Like several other orthodox authorities, Tryambaka portrays women as inherently sinful, born as female because of sins in their previous births. He quotes Manu-smrti, Mahabharata and Ramayana to assert that women are naturally inclined to fickle-mindedness, habitual lying, unfaithfulness, and other bad qualities. Like these authorities, he also talks about the virtuous behaviour of women, without explaining the implicit contradiction.

Tryambaka suggests that women have not fallen too low, and therefore, capable of receiving instructions specified in his book. He quotes Manu and other authorities to state that women have some inherently good qualities such as purity and good fortune.

Women are incomparably pure; at no time are they defiled; for menstruation sweeps away their sins month after month.

— Strī-dharma-paddhati, quoting Manu and other authorities

This concept of menstrual purity seems to be symbolic, since Tryambaka insists that a woman who behaves badly cannot escape penalties through ritual atonement (prayashchitta). Nevertheless, he states that women are blessed to have "the easiest path to heaven" - that of worshipping their husbands. Lastly, he argues that his instructions are useful for women because good conduct can destroy the inauspicious marks of one's nature or circumstances. Tryambaka uses these arguments to prove the usefulness of his text, and to persuade women to conform to the good behavior as specified by him.

=== The duties common to all women ===
Tryambaka outlines rulings on women's behavior from various texts; things that women should avoid; quotations praising wives devoted to their husbands (pati-vrata); duties and prohibitions specific to menstruating women, pregnant women, women whose husbands are away, and widows.

For example, according to him, the following six things corrupt a woman: drinking, keeping bad company, extramarital affairs, roaming around by herself, sleeping during the day, and spending time in other people's homes. The following six things cause women (and Shudras) to fall: recitation of sacred texts, ritual austerities (tapas), pilgrimage, renunciation (pravrajya), chanting of mantras, and worship of deities (other than her husband as long as the husband is alive).

Tryambaka states that a woman should never do anything independently, at any age, even in her own home: she should be subservient to her father as a child, to her husband as a wife, and to her sons as a widow. Regarding women's property rights, Tryambaka attempts to reconcile various contradictory authorities. For example, he lists the six types of property that a woman can own (e.g. given to her by her relatives), but states that a married woman needs her husband's permission to exercise her property rights. He also outlines certain exceptions to this rule; for example, a woman can make an occasional religious donation without her husband's permission, when he is away. Tryambaka also states that a woman's male relatives - including her husband - cannot use her property without her permission.

According to Tryambaka, the best thing a widow can do is die with her husband (sati). If this is not possible (e.g. because she is caring for an infant), she should lead a chaste and virtuous life, and remain dependent on her male relatives. Tryambaka discusses various arguments for and against the practice of niyoga, which allows a widow without a son to have sexual intercourse with another man to produce a son. He favours celibacy and adoption of a son over niyoga.

=== Conclusion ===
Tryambaka concludes that the primary religious duty of a woman is obedient service to her husband, without any regard for her own life: she should obey his commands even if they are in opposition to other religious duties. He quotes various episodes from religious texts to prove his point. For example, he refers to the story of Harishchandra to state that it is acceptable for a husband to sell his wife.

The author concludes by stating that he has included content from various texts (shruti, smriti, and puranas) in his work only after thorough examination. In the colophon, he dedicates his work to Krishna.

== Manuscripts and printed edition ==
Three Devanagari manuscripts of the text are available at the Saraswathi Mahal Library in Thanjavur. Copyist P.S. Lalitha made a hand-written copy of one of these manuscripts for academic Julia Leslie in 1981. Another Devanagari manuscript exists at the Oriental Research Institute Mysore. A Telugu manuscript titled Strī-dharma-saṅgraha at Vizianagaram Fort is listed in V. Raghavan's New Catalogus Catalogorum, but Leslie was unable to find it.

A printed version of the text, titled Tryambaka-raya-makhini-baddha strinam avasyika dharma-paddhatih, exists with a Tamil translation. The text does not mention the name of its date, editor, translator or publisher. According to Chandrashekarendra Saraswati of Kanchi Kamakoti Math, this text was edited and translated in 1917-20 by Panchapagesa Sastri (brother of T. Ganapati Sastri) of his organization.

== Assessment ==
The text predates the 19th century social reforms of British India, and thus, is an important source of information about the life of the orthodox Hindu women at the Thanjavur Maratha court. Academic Julia Leslie notes that according to modern anthropological research, the prescriptions in various Hindu texts are not followed in reality. This must have also been true for 18th-century Thanjavur: not all the religious ideals outlined in the Strī-dharma-paddhati were followed there. Thus, like other dharma-shastra texts, the norms presented in the text are a mixture of reality and the author's ideals.

According to academic Sharada Sugirtharajah, "Tryambaka assigns a subservient role to women, who are seen as essentially wicked and in need of patriarchal monitoring and control; it is only through their strīdharma (devotion) and service to their husbands, that they can become good or virtuous." Sugirtharajah notes that the text is not a reflection of the social reality, and the 19th century colonial discourse incorrectly tended to assume that the Hindu society relied entirely on textual authority. Other contemporary and near-contemporary texts (such as Muddupalani's Radhika-santvanam) offer a more liberative image of women.

According to Julia Leslie, the Thanjavur Marathas - who were Marathi-speaking Hindus - faced a cultural isolation, as they governed a Tamil territory and struggled to retain their independence against the Muslim Mughals. Trymbaka responded to this isolation by writing a work that reinforced his own cultural ideals.
