= Thanjavur Marathi =

Thanjavur Marathi may refer to:

- Thanjavur Marathi (people), an ethno-linguistic group in Tamil Nadu which originated mainly during the rule of the Thanjavur Maratha kingdom
- Thanjavur Marathi (language), a dialect of the Marathi language spoken by the Thanjavur Marathi people
