= Cow dung =

Waste product from a cow or cattle in general

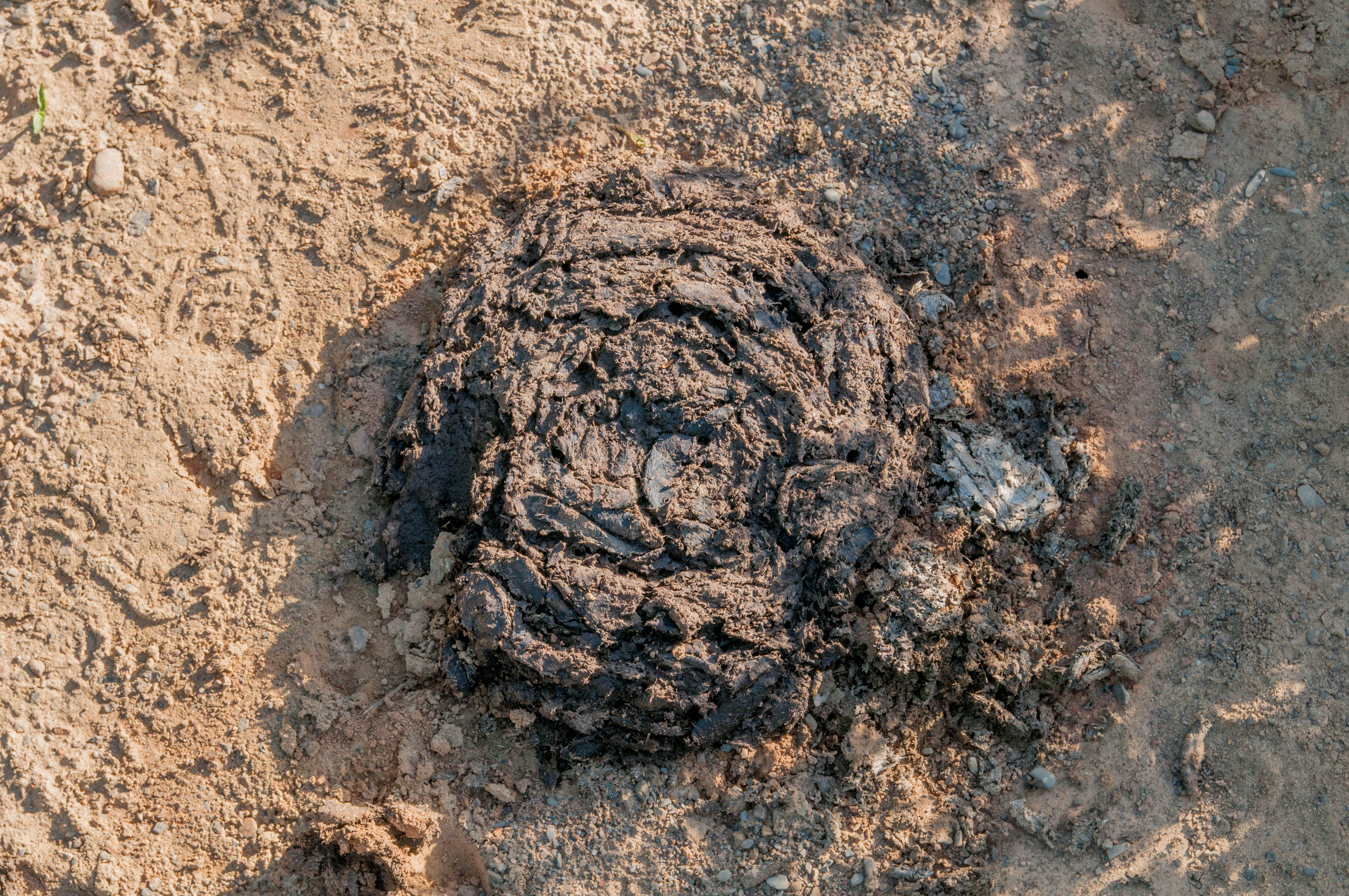
Cow dung on the ground

Cow dung, also known as cowpats or cow pats, cow pies, cow faeces, or cow manure, is the waste product (faeces) of bovine animal species. These species include domestic cattle ("cows"), bison ("buffalo"), yak, and water buffalo. Cow dung is the undigested residue of plant matter which has passed through the animal's gut, as well as water, gut bacteria, old red blood cells and digestive enzymes. The resultant faecal matter is rich in minerals. The colour ranges from greenish to blackish, often darkening soon after exposure to air.

== Uses ==
=== Fuel ===
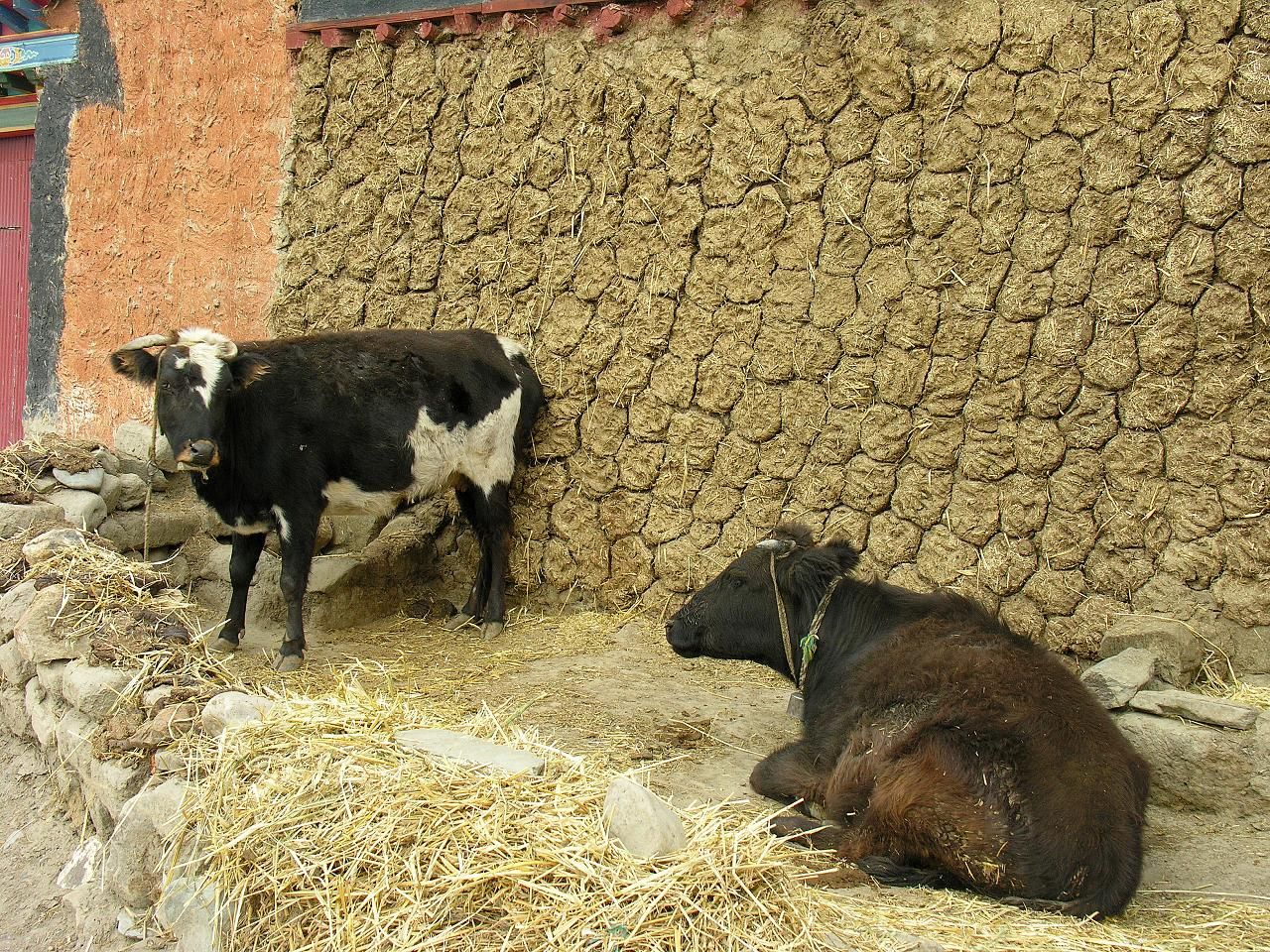
Drying cow dung for fuel

In some parts of Eurasia, and in the past in mountain regions of Europe, caked and dried cow dung is used as fuel. In India, it is dried into cake like shapes called upla or kanda, and used as replacement for firewood for cooking in chulah (traditional kitchen stove).

Dung may also be collected and used to produce biogas to generate electricity and heat. The gas is rich in methane and is used in rural areas of India and Pakistan and elsewhere to provide a renewable and stable (but unsustainable) source of electricity.

=== Fertilizer ===
Cow dung, which is usually a dark brown colour, is often used as manure (agricultural fertilizer). If not recycled into the soil by species such as earthworms and dung beetles, cow dung can dry out and remain on the pasture, creating an area of grazing land which is unpalatable to livestock.

Cow dung is nowadays used for making flower and plant pots. It is plastic free, biodegradable and eco-friendly. Unlike plastic grow bags which harm nature, cow dung pots dissolves naturally and becomes excellent manure for the plant. From 20 July 2020, State Government of Chhattisgarh India started buying cow dung under the Godhan Nyay Yojana scheme. Cow dung procured under this scheme will be utilised for the production of vermicompost fertilizer.

=== Floor and wall coating ===
In several cultures, cow dung is traditionally used to coat floors and walls. In parts of Africa, floors of rural huts are smeared with cow dung: this is believed to improve interior hygiene and repel insects. This practice has various names, such as "ukusinda" in Xhosa, and "gwaya" in Ruruuli-Lunyala.

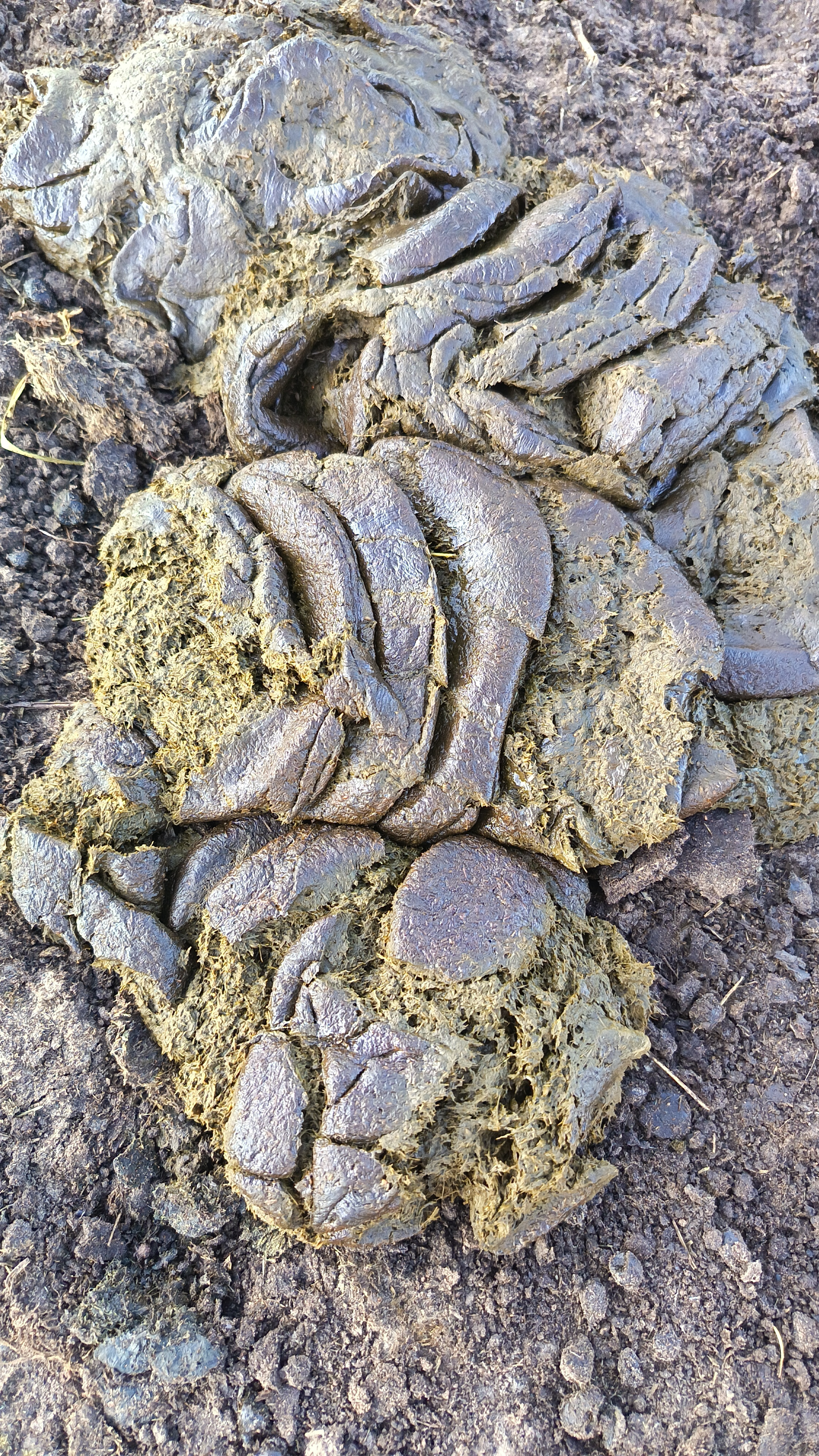
Fresh cow dung

Similarly, in India, floors are traditionally smeared with cow dung to clean and smoothen them. Purananuru, generally dated 150 BCE, mentions women of Tamil Nadu smear cow dung on the floors at the 13th day after her husband's death to purify the house. The Italian traveler Pietro Della Valle, who visited India in 1624, observed that the locals, including Christians, smeared floor with cow dung to purify it and repel insects. Tryambaka's Strī-dharma-paddhati (18th century), which narrates a modified version of the Mahabharata legend about how the goddess Lakshmi came to reside in cow dung, instructs women to make their homes pure and prosperous by coating them with cow-dung. Many among modern generations have challenged this practice as unclean.

In 2021, the Government of India's Khadi and Village Industries Commission launched the Khadi Prakritik paint, which has cow dung as its main ingredient, promoting it as an eco-friendly paint with anti-fungal and anti-bacterial properties.

=== Other uses ===
In central Africa, Maasai villages have burned cow dung inside to repel mosquitos. In cold places, cow dung is used to line the walls of rustic houses as a cheap thermal insulator. Villagers in India spray fresh cow dung mixed with water in front of the houses to repel insects.

In Rwanda, it is used in an art form called imigongo.

Cow dung is also an optional ingredient in the manufacture of adobe mud brick housing depending on the availability of materials at hand.

A deposit of cow dung is referred to in American English as a "cow pie" or less commonly "cow chip" (usually when dried) and in British English as a "cowpat". When dry, it is used in the practice of "cow chip throwing" popularized in Beaver, Oklahoma in 1970. On April 21, 2001 Robert Deevers of Elgin, Oklahoma, set the record for cow chip throwing with a distance of 185 feet 5 inches (56.52 m).

== Ecology ==
Cow dung provides food for a wide range of animal and fungus species, which break it down and recycle it into the food chain and into the soil.

In areas where cattle (or other mammals with similar dung) are not native, there are often also no native species which can break down their dung, and this can lead to infestations of pests such as flies and parasitic worms. In Australia, dung beetles from elsewhere have been introduced to help recycle the cattle dung back into the soil. (see the Australian Dung Beetle Project and Dr. George Bornemissza).

Cattle have a natural aversion to feeding around their own dung. This can lead to the formation of taller ungrazed patches of heavily fertilized sward. These habitat patches, termed "islets", can be beneficial for many grassland arthropods, including spiders (Araneae) and bugs (Hemiptera). They have an important function in maintaining biodiversity in heavily utilized pastures.

== Variants ==
A buffalo chip, also called a meadow muffin, is the name for a large, flat, dried piece of dung deposited by the American bison. Well dried buffalo chips were among the few things that could be collected and burned on the prairie and were used by the Plains Indians, settlers and pioneers, and homesteaders as a source of cooking heat and warmth.

Bison dung is sometimes referred to by the name nik-nik. This word is a borrowing from the Sioux language (which probably originally borrowed it from a northern source). In modern Sioux, nik-nik can refer to the faeces of any bovine, including domestic cattle. It has also come to be used, especially in Lakota, to refer to lies or broken promises, analogously to the vulgar English term "bullshit" as a figure of speech.

== Religious views ==
=== In Buddhism ===
The Tantric Buddhist ritual manuals Jayavatī-nāma-mahāvidyārāja-dhāraṇī and Mahāvairocanābhisaṃbodhi recommend use of cow dung to purify mandala altars.

=== In Hinduism ===
In Hinduism, cow dung has traditional ritual and cultural uses. It is sometimes believed to have antiseptic qualities and is used in certain households to clean or coat floors as part of customary practices. Cow dung is also used in the making of pancha-gavya, for use in Hindu rituals. The Yājñavalkya Smṛti - a Hindu text from the Classical period of Ancient India states that the pancha-gavya purifies many sins.

The Mahabharata narrates a story about how Lakshmi, the goddess of prosperity, came to reside in cow dung. In the legend, Lakshmi asks cows to let her live in their bodies because they are pure and sinless. The cows refuse, describing her as unstable and fickle. Lakshmi begs them to accept her request, saying that others would ridicule her for being rejected by the cows, and agreeing to live in the most despised part of their body. The cows then allow her to live in their dung and urine.

== Gallery ==
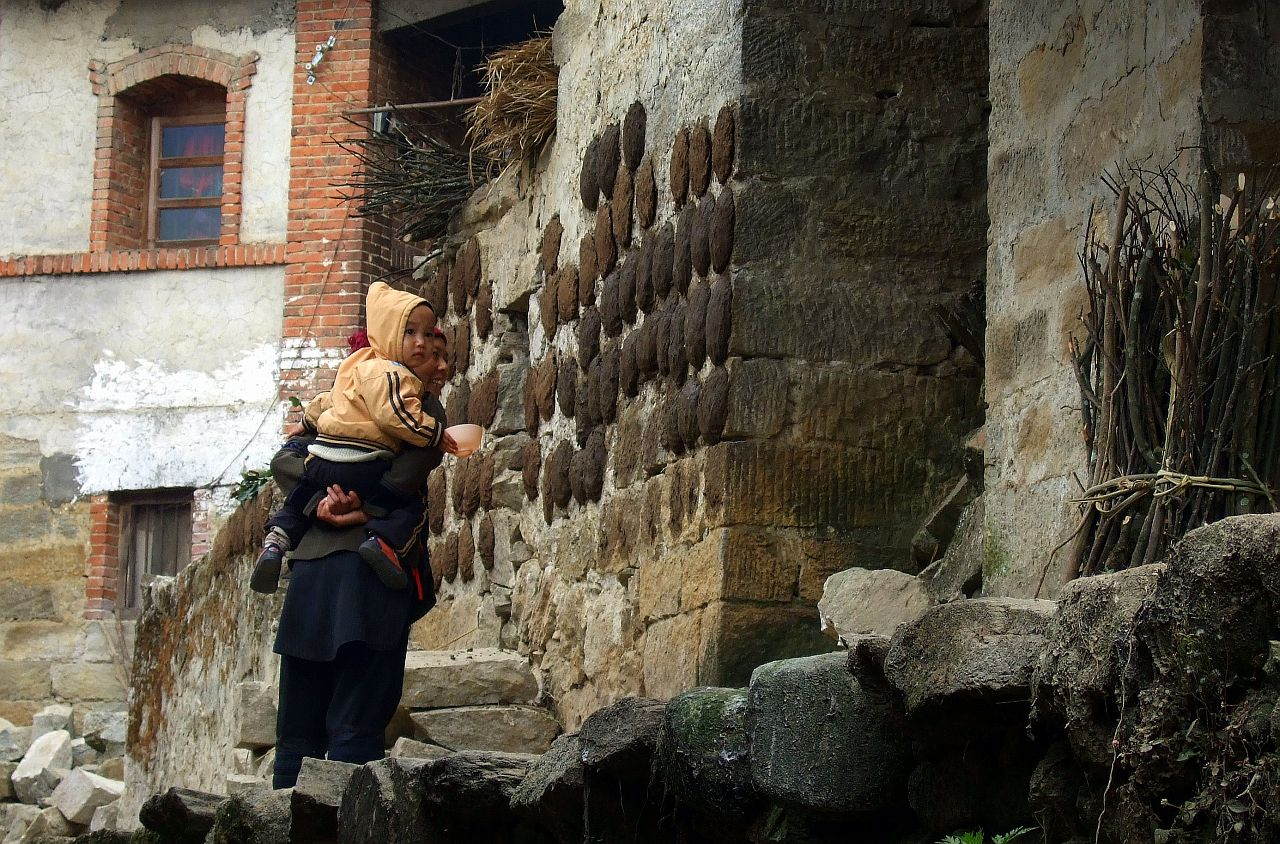
Water buffalo dung drying on the wall of a house in Yuanyang County, Yunnan, China

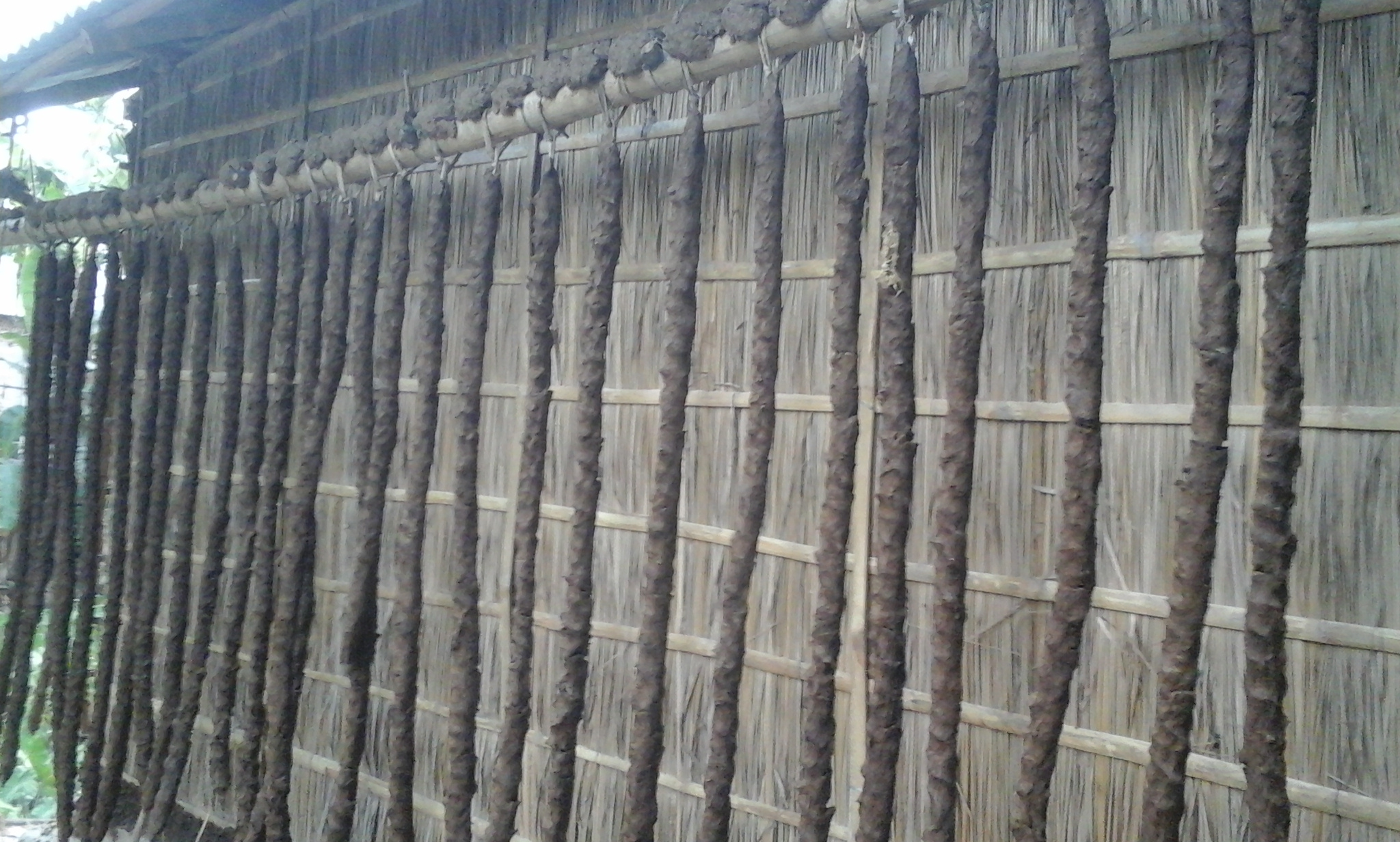
Cow dung fuel in Bangladesh

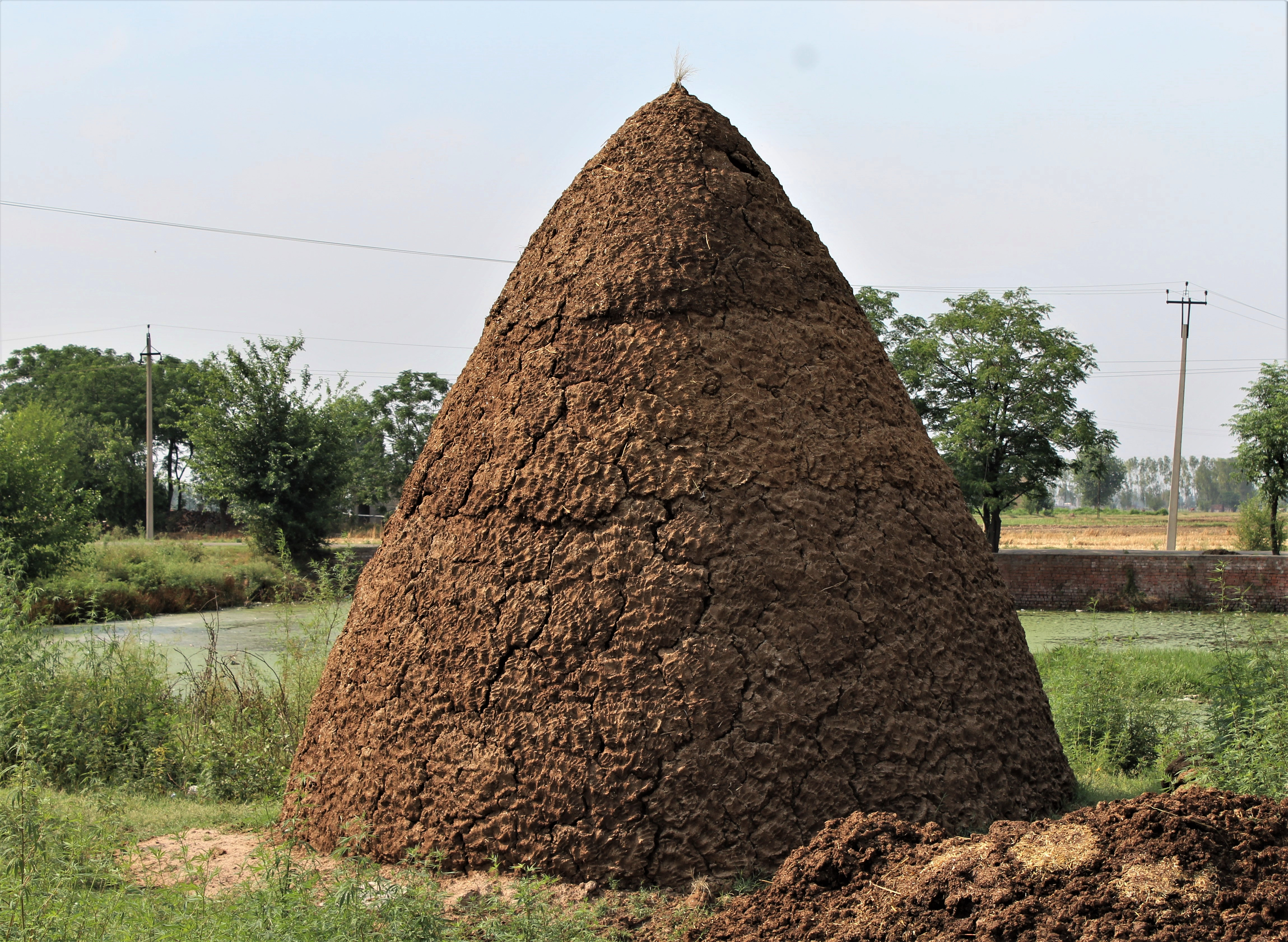
Cow-dung mound in Punjab

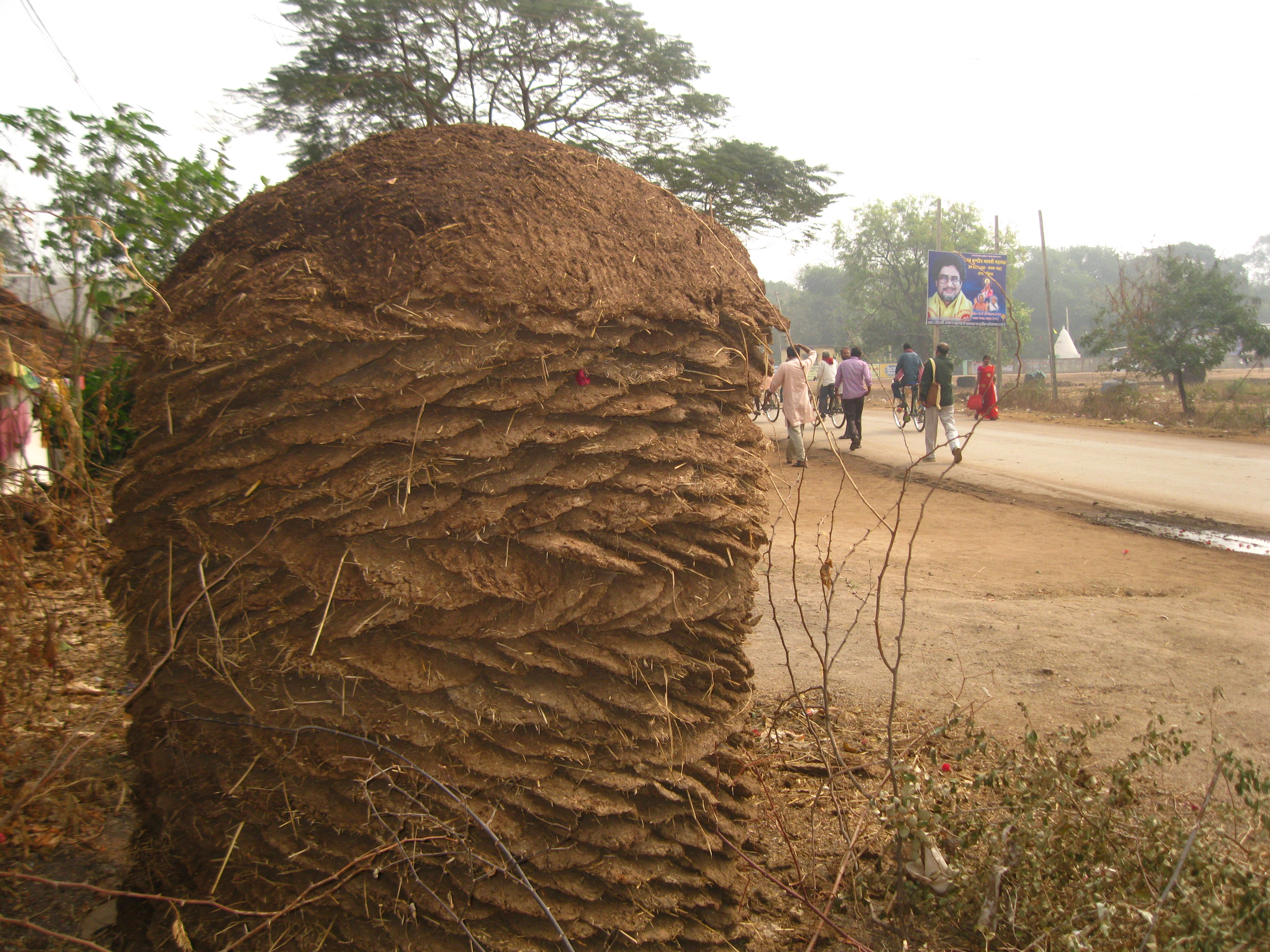
A mound of cow dung in Chhattisgarh, India

== See also ==
- Biomass briquettes
- Chicken manure
- Coprophilous fungi
- Dry animal dung fuel
- Imigongo
- Shit Museum
- Sigri (stove) stove fueled with dried cow dung
