= Sujana Bai =

Ruler of Thanjavur Maratha kingdom from 1737–1738

Sujana Bai Bhosale
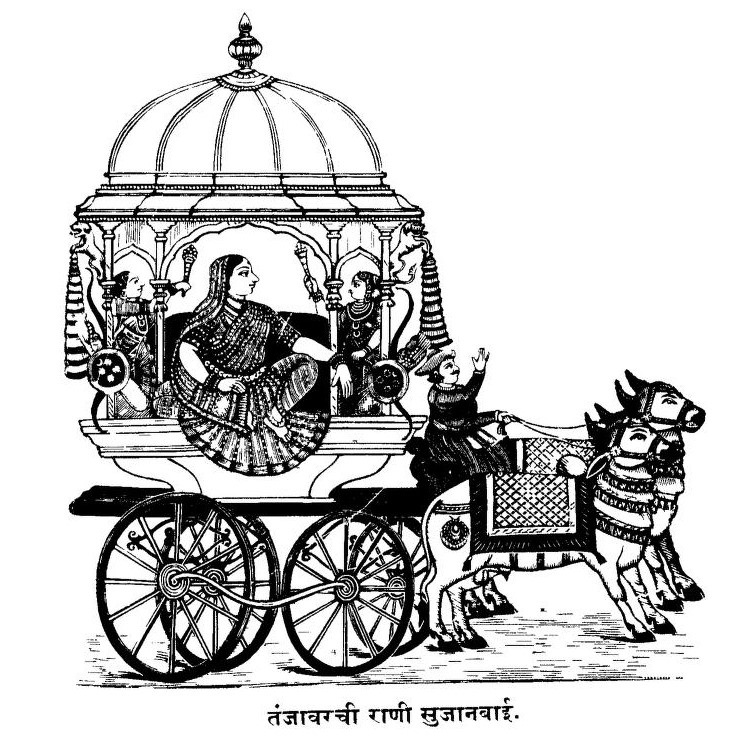

Rani of Thanjavur
- Reign: 1737–1738
- Predecessor: Ekoji II
- Successor: Shahuji II
- Died: after 1738
- House: Bhonsle
- Religion: Hinduism

Sujana Bai Bhonsle or Sujan Bai Bhonsle was the Maratha queen of Thanjavur of king Ekoji II of the Bhonsle dynasty. She ruled the state from the death of her husband in 1737 until she was deposed in 1738.

== Reign ==
Sujana Bai ascended the throne on the death of her husband Ekoji II in 1737 and ruled the state for a year. Her reign is notable for intrigues of Sayyid who held the actual power behind the throne. In the end, taking matters onto her own hands she drove out the pretender Katturaja. Katturaja sought the help of the French and invaded Thanjavur. Sujana Bai was deposed and Katturaja ascended the throne as Shahuji II.

Preceded by Ekoji II	Maratha Ruler of Thanjavur; 1737–1738	Succeeded by Shahuji II
