= Serugudi Sukshmapureeswarar Temple =

Religion
- Affiliation: Hinduism
- District: Tiruvarur
- Deity: Lord Shiva

Location
- Location: Serugudi
- State: Tamil Nadu
- Country: India
- Interactive map of Serugudi Sukshmapureeswarar Temple
- Coordinates: 10°57′55″N 79°35′20″E

Serugudi Sukshmapureewarar Temple is a Hindu temple located in the village of Serugudi in the Tiruvarur district of Tamil Nadu, India. The presiding deity is Shiva.

== Significance ==
Hymns in praise of the temple have been sung by Sambandar.

== Deities ==
The presiding deity is Shiva. Apart from Shiva, there are also shrines to Ganesha, Murugan and the Navagrahas.
