= Pambar River (Southern Tamil Nadu) =

River in India

Pambar River, also called Sarpanadi, is a river which flows through the Sivaganga, Pudukkottai and Ramanathapuram districts of Tamil Nadu, India. It originates at Perunganur in Pudukkottai district and flows for about 50 kilometres (31 mi) before joining the Bay of Bengal at Muthukuda in Pudukottai district. It joins the Tennar at Tevarendal and Virusuliar at Kidangur.

The Pambar formed the official boundary between the Thanjavur Maratha and Ramnad kingdoms from 1725 to 1799. It forms Pudukkottai district's boundary with Sivaganga and Ramanathapuram districts.
