= Shambusinghji Rao =

Chiranjiva Shambhusinghji Rao Sahib (died 1891) was the adopted son of Vijaya Mohana Muktamba Bai, the daughter of the last Maratha ruler of Tanjore, Shivaji of Thanjavur. He was the head of the Bhonsle royal family from 1885 when his adoptive mother died till 1891. However, being an adopted son of the Rani, his titles were not recognised by the British Empire and he remained a pretender until his death.

Preceded by Vijaya Mohana Muktamba Bai	Pretender to the throne of Thanjavur; 1885–1891	Succeeded by None
