= Tukkoji =

Raja of Thanjavur Maratha kingdom from 1728–1736

Tukoji Raje Bhosale
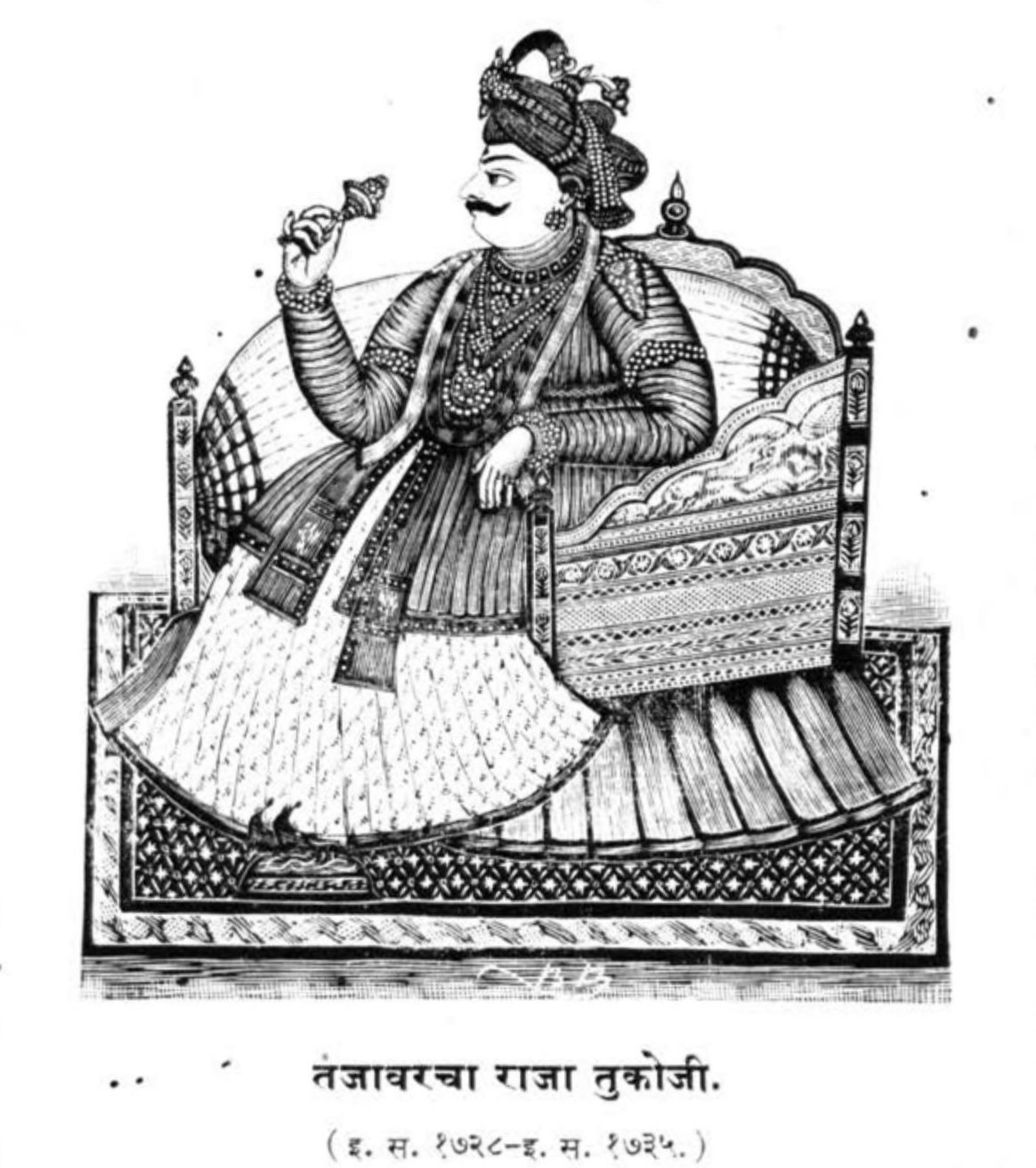

Raja of Thanjavur
- Reign: 1728 to 1736
- Predecessor: Serfoji I
- Successor: Ekoji II
- Born: 1677
- Died: 1736 (aged 40-41); Thanjavur
- House: Bhonsle
- Father: Ekoji I
- Religion: Hinduism

Tukkoji Bhonsle (1677–1736) was the fourth Maratha ruler of Thanjavur, located in South India. He was from the Bhonsle dynasty and was the son of Ekoji I as well as the younger brother of Shahuji I and Serfoji I. Tukkoji ruled Thanjavur from 1728 to 1736.

== Reign ==
Tukkoji succeeded his brother Serfoji I to the throne of Thanjavur on the former's death in 1728 and is believed to have reigned until 1736. However, the available records don't agree with each other. While the Tanjore Marathi inscriptions assign eight years to his rule the Madras Tamil manuscript assigns only 6 years.

Tukkoji concluded the Marava war commenced by Serfoji I. Unlike his brother, however, he switched over to Bhavani Shankar's side and helped the latter attain the throne.

Marathi inscriptions of this period record Tukkoji's aid to Meenakshi the Queen of Tiruchirapalli against the Palaiyakkarar who rose in revolt against her. He also fought against Chanda Sahib on the side of the Hindu rajas of South India. Chanda Sahib's first expedition in 1734 was bought off. But the second expedition in 1736 resulted in the fall of Tiruchirapalli.

Tukkoji was a good linguist. He is also credited with having introduced Hindusthani music in Thanjavur. He wrote a work on music called Sangeetha Samamrita. His minister Ghansyama Pandit wrote a commentary on the Uttaramacharitra of Bhavabhuti.

== Death and succession ==
Tukkoji died in 1736. He left behind one legitimate son Ekoji who succeeded to the throne on the death of his father. But he ruled for not more than a year. However he had a number of offspring from his concubines. A three-year-long period of anarchy followed his death. It came to an end only with the accession of Pratapsingh in 1739.

== See also ==
- Bhonsle
- Maratha Empire
- List of Maratha dynasties and states
- Thanjavur Maratha kingdom

Preceded by Serfoji I	Maratha Raja of Thanjavur; 1728–1736	Succeeded by Ekoji II
