= Shivaji of Thanjavur =

Last ruling Raja of Thanjavur Maratha kingdom from 1832–1855

Shivaji Bhonsle of Thanjavur
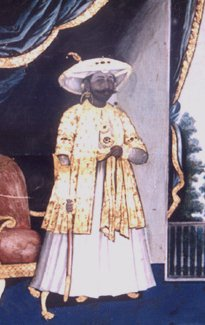
- Shivaji Bhonsle of Thanjavur

Raja of Thanjavur
- Reign: 17 March 1832 – 29 October 1855
- Coronation: 17 March 1832, Durbar Hall, Tanjore Fort
- Predecessor: Serfoji II
- Successor: Position Abolished
- Died: 29 October 1855; Sadar Mahal, Tanjore Fort,
- Issue: Rajasa Boje Ammanee Rajur Bai (daughter); Vijaya Mohana Muktamba Bai (daughter)
- Dynasty: Bhonsle
- Father: Serfoji II
- Religion: Hinduism

Raja Shivaji (Marathi: तंजावरचे शिवाजी) (fl. 17 March 1832 – 29 October 1855) of the Bhonsle dynasty of Thanjavur in India, was the son of Raja Serfoji II and ruled the fortress of Thanjavur and its surroundings from 1832 to 1855. He was the last Raja of Thanjavur known to wield any authority.

Raja Shivaji was the only surviving son of Serfoji II when the latter died in 1832. The missionary Heber describes the young Shivaji as a 'pale and sickly child'. However, his health seemed to have got better as he grew up for he is known for his physical and mental attainments. He contributed to the expansion of the Saraswathi Mahal Library and gave many useful books. One Varahappaiyar prepared the catalogue for all the manuscripts in the library.

== 'Arrest' of the Kanchi Mutt ==
But Shivaji is mostly known for the incident related to the 'arrest' of the Kanchi mutt. The earrings (tatankas) of the goddess Akhilandeswari in the Jambukeshwarar Temple were replaced with new ones in 1843–44. Therefore, the Kanchi mutt, then based in Kumbakonam, shifted to Trichy with all its retinue in order to conduct a Tatanka-Pratishta ceremony for consecration of the earrings. However a lawsuit delayed the proceedings and the court case along with the ceremonies that followed incurred such heavy debts on the part of the Mutt that they were unable to return to Kumbakonam. At this juncture, the administrator-in-charge of the ceremonies, a young Brahmin, went to the court of Shivaji and requested that the retinue be allowed to stop at Thanjavur to receive donations from the people. However the Raja staunchly refused.

Nevertheless, as the palanquin of the Shankaracharya and his retinue were making their way to Kumbakonam, they were stopped on the banks of the Cauvery at Thiruvaiyaru by the Raja's sepoys, who surrounded them and respectfully escorted them into the city of Thanjavur. At Thanjavur, they were accorded a royal reception by Shivaji and the citizens of Thanjavur. It was later said that the Raja had had a dream a few nights before in which Lord Shiva had appeared and ordered him to render due honors to the Mutt. This incident is often referred to as the 'Arrest' of the Kanchi Mutt.

Raja Shivaji died on 29 October 1855 after a reign of 22 years.

On the death of Shivaji, due to the absence of a legitimate heir to the throne, the kingdom was annexed by the British East India Company as per the Doctrine of lapse.

== See also ==
- Bhonsle
- Maratha Empire
- List of Maratha dynasties and states
- Thanjavur Maratha kingdom

Preceded by Serfoji II	Maratha Raja of Thanjavur; 1832–1855	Succeeded by Vijaya Mohana Mutumbar Bai (titular); Serfoji III (Pretender)
