= Sigri (stove) =

Stove used for cooking

A Sigri is a stove used for cooking, especially in North India. The fuel used is usually coal, dried cow dung and wood, therefore it is principally used by those who cannot afford liquefied petroleum gas stoves. Sigris are also used during winters for warmth.

== Manufacture ==
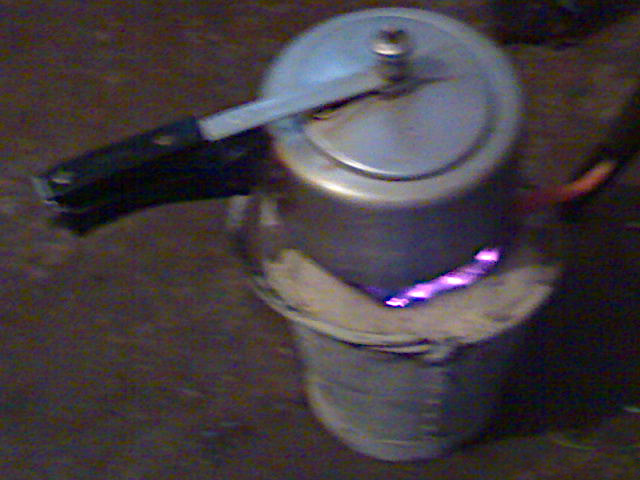
Food being cooked on a sigri

A traditional Sigri is made from a steel cylinder by cutting a small hole in the side wall (to be used when lighting the stove). Then, several thin iron rods are pushed through the walls about seven centimetres below the upper opening, to form a mesh. The walls and the interior are covered with approximately an inch of clay, which acts as an insulator.

== Lighting ==
Lighting a Sigri requires a substantial amount of effort. First, the fuel (either coal, cow dung or wood pieces) is loaded through the upper opening. A piece of cow dung (perhaps soaked in kerosene) is then lit and inserted through the hole in the side of the Sigri, below the iron rods. The Sigri is then left in a well-ventilated area until it stops emitting smoke, once up to temperature it will produce a smokeless heat. During this period it is necessary to occasionally stoke and fan the Sigri.

== Prevalence ==
The use of Sigris is now confined to villages and small towns because of the lengthy amount of time it takes to light and the large volume of smoke initially produced. Sigris are a good method for cooking dishes which require an even supply of heat or to impart a smoky flavour, and as such have made a modest resurgence amongst restaurants.
