= Ekoji II =

Raja of Thanjavur Maratha kingdom from 1736–1737

Raja of Thanjavur
- Reign: 1736–1737
- Predecessor: Tukkoji
- Successor: Sujanbai
- Born: 1696
- Died: 1737 (aged 40–41); Thanjavur
- House: Bhonsle
- Father: Tukkoji
- Religion: Hinduism

Ekoji II Bhonsle (1694 or 1696–1737) aka Venkoji II or Vyankoji II of the Bhonsle dynasty was the eldest surviving son of Maratha king of Thanjavur Tukkoji who succeeded to the throne on the death of his father in 1736. His reign was remarkably short and he died due to ill-health in 1737.

== Reign ==
Ekoji II was born in Sukuti, 1694 or 1696. He ascended the throne in 1736 and ruled for about a year. He fought hard against Chanda Sahib who invaded in 1736. The Madras manuscript says that the treasury was empty and the king appointed new ministers who could not cope up with the work. During this period, the power of court-officials increased greatly and one of them Sayyid emerged as a king-maker. Ekoji died in 1737 at age 41 or 43 though it is not known whether he died due to illness or palace intrigues.

Preceded by Tukkoji	Maratha Raja of Thanjavur; 1736–1737	Succeeded by Sujana Bai
