= Vijaya Mohana Muktamba Bai =

Indian royal

Vijaya Mohana Muktamba Bai Ammani Raje Sahib Chhatrapati CI (1846 – 31 January 1885) or Vijaya Mohana Mutumbar Bai as per British records, was a member of the Marathi Bhonsle royal family who succeeded Shivaji as the ruler of the princely state of Tanjore. However, her position was purely titular and apart from customary privileges, she had little authority.

== Early life ==
Vijaya Bai was the second daughter of Shivaji, the last Maratha ruler of Tanjore and Kamakshi Bai, the queen of Tanjore and was born in 1846. She became the heir-apparent on the death of her elder sister Rajasa Boje Ammanee Rajur Bai.

== Shivaji's death and British annexation of Tanjore ==
Shivaji died in 1855. In the absence of a natural male heir to the throne, Tanjore was annexed by the British East India Company as per the newly constituted Doctrine of Lapse.

Nine-year-old Vijaya Bai assumed the title of Queen of Tanjore on 31 October 1855 after the British refused to recognise the claims of Serfoji III, an adopted son of Shivaji II, but she had little authority in the kingdom apart from certain customary privileges. The dispossessed queen fought an unsuccessful legal battle to get her authority restored.

== Personal life ==
With the permission of the Madras government, Vijaya Bai married Sakharam Saheb, the prince of Kolhapur and the widower of Princess Rajur Bai in about 1859. She adopted Shambusinghji Rao.

== Honours ==
Muktamba Bai was granted a personal salute of 13 guns on 8 December 1874. She was awarded the Prince of Wales' gold medal in 1876 and the Empress of India Medal in gold in 1877. Muktamba Bai was appointed to the Order of the Crown of India in the New Year Honours' List of 1878.

== Notes ==
Preceded by Shivaji	Rani of Thanjavur (titular); 1855–1885	Succeeded by Shambusinghji Rao
