= Sarabhojirajapuram =

- village
- Country: India
- State: Tamil Nadu
- District: Thanjavur
- Taluk: Papanasam

Government
  - Type: Panchayati raj (India)
  - Body: Gram panchayat

Population (2001)
  - Total: 2,612

Languages
  - Official: Tamil
- Time zone: UTC+5:30 (IST)

Sarabhojirajapuram is a village in the Papanasam taluk of Thanjavur district, Tamil Nadu, India. The village was established as an agraharam by the Thanjavur Maratha ruler Serfoji I.

== Demographics ==
According to the 2001 census, Sarabhojirajapuram had a total population of 2612 with 1269 males and 1343 females. The sex ratio was 1058. The literacy rate was 84.74.
