= Serfoji I =

Raja of Thanjavur Maratha kingdom from 1712–1728

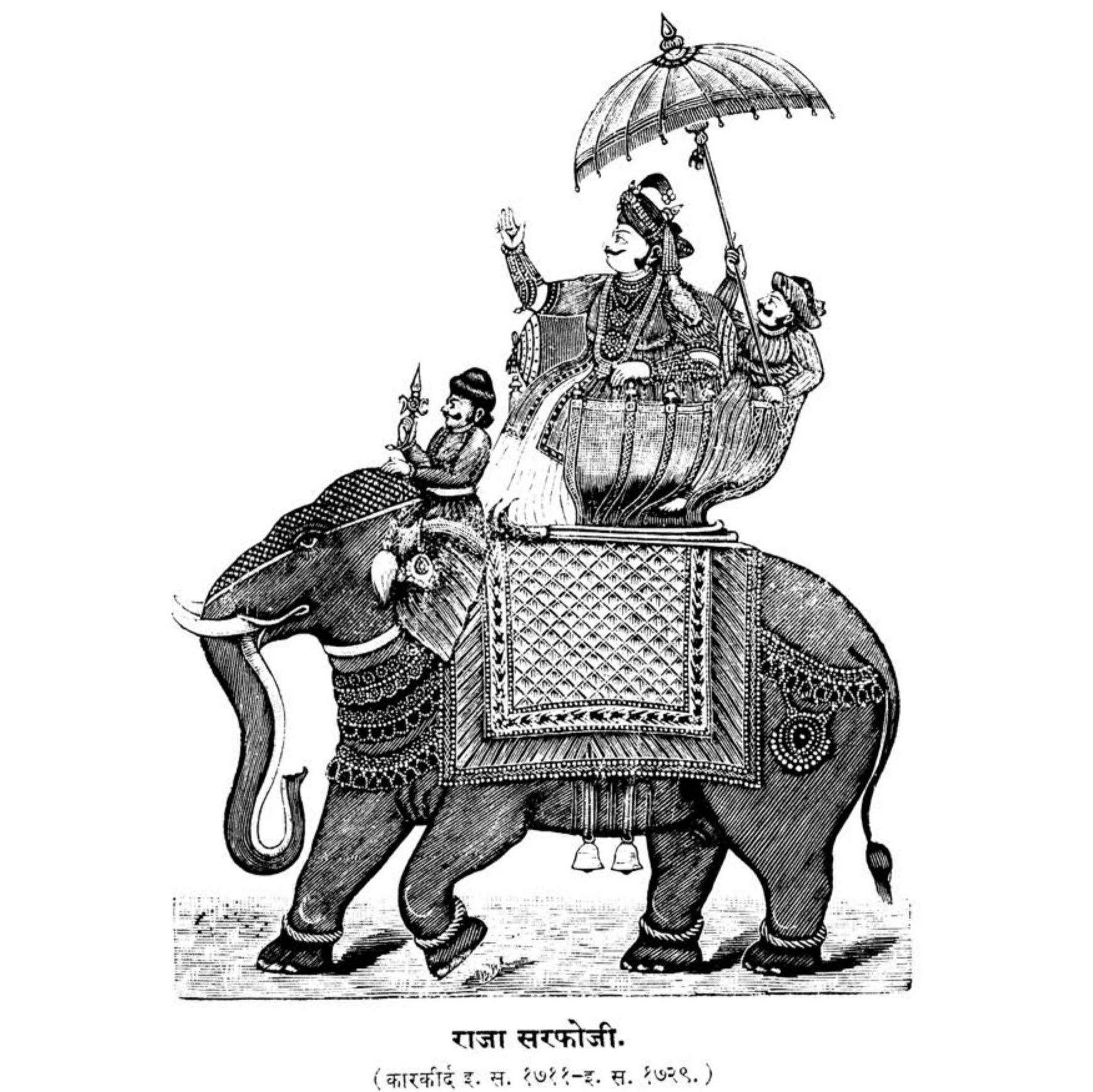

Raja of Thanjavur
- Reign: 1712 to 1728
- Predecessor: Shahuji I of Thanjavur
- Successor: Tukkoji
- Born: 1675
- Died: 1728 (aged 52–53); Thanjavur
- House: Bhonsle
- Father: Ekoji I
- Religion: Hinduism

Serfoji I (1675–1728), also spelt as Sarabhoji I Bhonsle, was the son of the Maratha ruler of Thanjavur Ekoji I and the Raja of Thanjavur from 1712 to 1728. He was the third Raja of the Bhonsle dynasty of Thanjavur. He consolidated the hold of Marathas over Thanjavur and patronised arts and literature.

== The Marava War of Succession ==
A war of succession broke out in the Marava kingdom in the year 1720. Vijaya Raghunatha, the adopted son of Raja Kilavan had died and a war of succession broke out between two other sons of Kilavan namely Bhavani Shankar and Tanda Teva. Serfoji I supported the cause of Bhavani Shankar and placed him on the throne. But Bhavani Shankar did not fulfill his promise to cede all lands north of the Pambar River to Thanjavur. Thanjavur switched sides and began to support another pretender. The Marava army suffered a crushing defeat at the hands of Serfoji I. Bhavani Shankar was deposed and the country conquered by Serfoji I. The country was split up into three parts: one part was annexed by Thanjavur while the Zamindaris of Sivaganga and Ramnad were created out of the other two.

== Nizam's invasion ==
In 1725, Nizam forces under Iwaz Khan besieged Trichinopoly from Serfoji. The reason for the campaign was the tax collection of Maratha agents from what Nizam's considered his own influence. The Maratha forces of 50,000 men under Fateh Singh Bhonsle were sent by Shahu I to support Serfoji. The Marathas suffered heavy losses and were forced to retreat. Two years later, in 1727, Fateh Singh Bhonsle once again marched into Karnataka but was unable to stop the Nizam's armies from ousting the Maratha collectors. The Nizam further decided to pacify the Maratha taxation rights in his own domains by attacking Pune which was met with response from Peshwa Bajirao I. The Nizam was ultimately defeated by Bajirao at the Battle of Palkhed in 1728 and was forced to sign the Treaty of Mungi-Shevgaon. The treaty essentially reduced the Nizams to tributary status of Marathas.

== Encounter with Abirami Pattar ==
Ruler Serfoji I, the Maratha Raja of Thanjavur who ruled over the land, visited the Abirami temple to pay homage to Lord Shiva. On noticing the peculiar behavior of Subramaniya Iyer (also known as Abirami Pattar) who was a temple priest, he inquired the other priests about the individual. One of them remarked that he was a madman while another rejected this categorization explaining to the king that Subramaniya Iyer was only an ardent devotee of Goddess Abhirami. Seeking to know the truth himself, Serfoji approached the priest and asked him what day of the month it was i.e. whether it was a full-moon day or a new-moon day. Subramaniya Iyer answered mistakenly that it was a Pournami (Tamil: பௌர்ணமி, Lit. full-moon day) who could see nothing else but the shining luminant form of the Goddess. While in reality, the night was an Amavasya (Tamil: அம்மாவசை, Lit. new-moon day). The king rode off informing the former that he would have his head cut off, if the moon did not appear on the sky by six in the night.

Immediately realizing his mistake, Subramaniya Iyer supposedly lit a huge fire and erected a platform over it supported by a hundred ropes. He sat upon the platform and prayed to the Goddess Abhirami to save him. He cut off one rope after another in succession on completion of each verse of his prayer. These hymns form the Abhirami Anthadhi. On verge of completing the 79th hymn, the Goddess Abhirami manifested herself before him and threw her thadanga (Tamil: தடங்கை, Lit. diamond earring ornament), over the sky such that it shined with bright light upon the horizon. The area around the temple was surrounded by light like noon. Overcome with ecstasy, Subramaniya Iyer composed 21 more verses in praise of the Goddess.

The king repented his mistake and immediately cancelled the punishment he had awarded Subramaniya Iyer. He also bestowed upon the latter the title of "Abirami Pattar" or "One who worships Goddess Abhirami or The Priest of Goddess Abhirami" and awarded his successors the privilege of using the title "Bharathi".

== Literature ==
The reign of Serfoji I was known for literary works of considerable significance. Advaita Kirtana, a Tamil manuscript in the Tanjore library speaks of a breach in the Cauvery dam and refusal of the Madurai Nayak to allow this repair. Drought and famine followed, and then, the necessary repairs were carried out. There is a Sanskrit manuscript named Sarabhoji Charitra which praises the king for fighting with those who came to cut off the Cauvery dam. The reference here has to be traced to an event in the Marava war of succession.

Serfoji I is presented as a pious and charitable monarch. He endowed Brahmanas with agraharams like Mangamatam in Tiruverkadu and Sarabhojirajapuram in Tirukkadaiyur. Vidyaparinaya written by Vedakavi was enacted in the festival of the Goddess Anandavalli in Thanjavur. It speaks of the marriage of the individual soul with Vidya. Sarabharaja Vilasa and Ratinamanmatha were written by Jagannatha son of a minister of Ekoji. Sivabharata, a Sanskrit manuscript deals with the ancestry and achievements of Shivaji. It was translated into Tamil as Sivajicharitram.

== Succession ==
Serfoji I did not have a legitimate male offspring of his own. However, after his death, a claimant rose in the person of Katturaja who assumed the name Shahuji II and claimed to be an illegitimate offspring of Serfoji I.

== Death ==
Serfoji I died in 1728. One of his queens performed Sati. He was succeeded by his younger brother Tukkoji.

== See also ==
- Maratha Empire
- List of Maratha dynasties and states
- Thanjavur Maratha kingdom

== Footnotes ==
Preceded by Shahuji I	Maratha Raja of Thanjavur; 1712–1728	Succeeded by Tukkoji
