= Shahuji I =

Raja of Thanjavur Maratha kingdom from 1684–1712

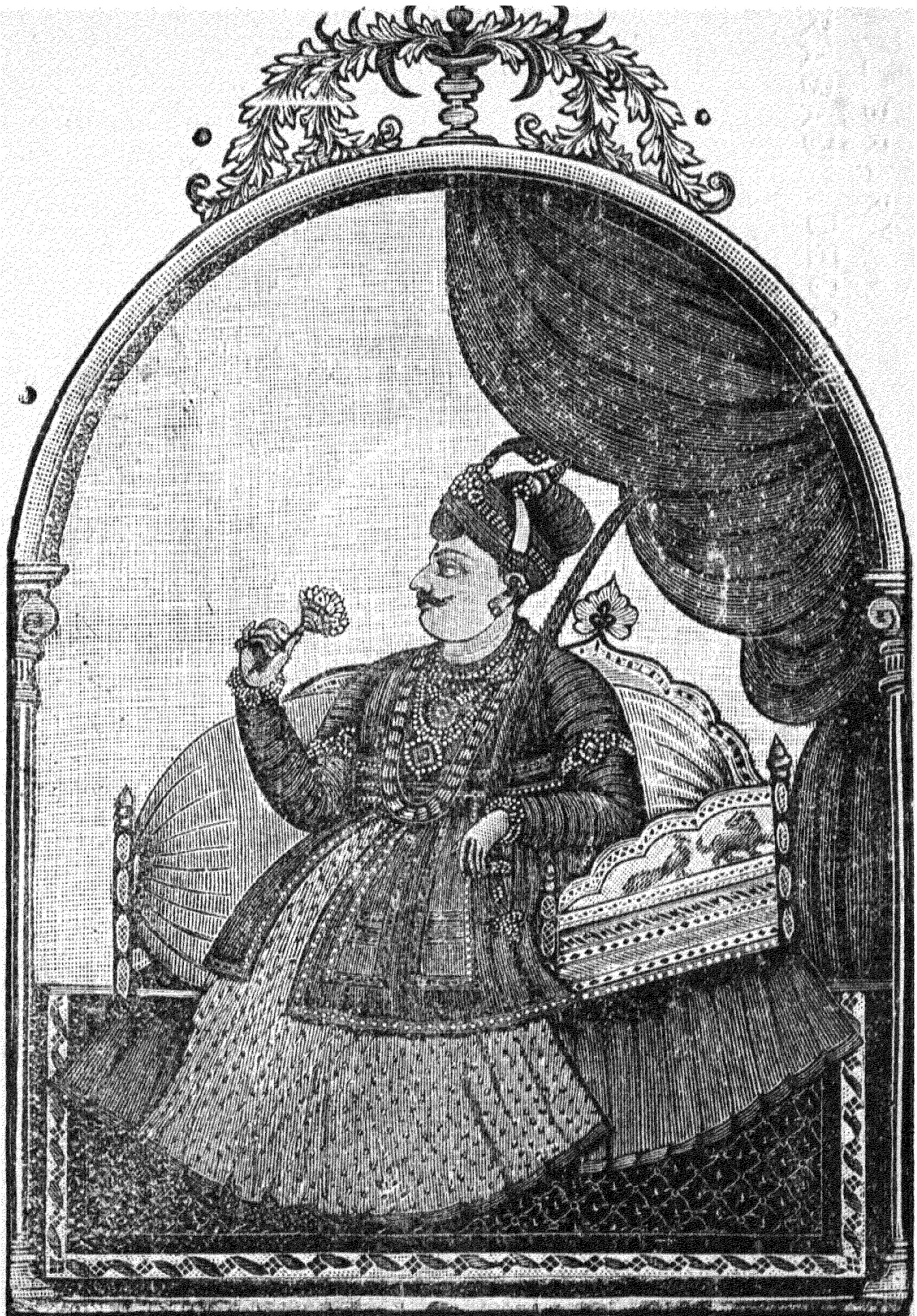

Raja of Thanjavur
- Reign: 1684–1712
- Predecessor: Ekoji I
- Successor: Serfoji I
- Born: 1672
- Died: 1712 (aged 39–40)
- House: Bhonsle
- Father: Ekoji I
- Religion: Hinduism

Shahuji I (b.1672) also called Shahji of the Bhonsle dynasty was the second Maratha ruler of Thanjavur. He was the eldest son of Ekoji I, who was a half brother of Shivaji, the first Maratha ruler of Thanjavur. He reigned from 1684 to 1712.

== Accession ==
Shahuji I ascended the throne in 1684 at the age of 12 on the death of his father Venkoji or Ekoji I the first Maratha ruler of Thanjavur.

== The campaign of Zulfiqar Khan ==
The Mughal Emperor Aurangazeb's Deccan campaign reached its highpoint after the death of Shivaji. The Deccan sultanates were annexed in 1687 and Shivaji's eldest son Sambhaji was captured and slain. However, the annihilation of the Maratha Empire was prevented by the brave resistance offered by Shivaji's second son Rajaram and his wife Tara Bai. As the Maratha territories were overrun by Mughal troops, the focus of resistance shifted to Gingee fort which Rajaram took in 1693 with an army of 20,000 men provided by his cousin, the Raja of Thanjavur.

Aurangazeb retaliated by sending his general Zulfiqar Khan who recaptured Gingee and pursued the fleeing Marathas into Thanjavur. From 1691, Thanjavur had been forced to pay a tribute of four lakhs to the Mughals in order to retain their sovereignty. In 1697, Zulfiqar Khan forced Shahuji I to return the lands he had obtained from Mangammal, the Nayaki of Tiruchirapalli.

== Wars and Conquests ==
An inscription at Pattukkottai boasts of the conquest of all lands between Pamban and Pudukkottai by Babaji son of Gangadhara, the agent of Shahuji I and the construction of a fort by the same official. Inscriptions also refer to the help offered by Shahji I to the Maravas. In 1700, Babaji invaded Tiruchirapalli in alliance with the Sethupathy of Ramnad. However, Rani Mangammal, the Queen of Tiruchirapalli inflicted a crushing defeat on Ramnad. Soon Shahuji I switched sides on account of the common danger to Thanjavur and Tiruchirapalli from the anicut built by Mysore across the Cauvery. A major war with Mysore was averted. But furious with Shahuji I over his new-found friendship with the Nayaks of Madurai / Tiruchirapalli, Kilavan, the Raja of Ramnad invaded Tiruchirapalli and defeated the forces of the Nayaki. He sent a huge army across the dominions of Shahuji I and took the fort of Aranthangi in 1709.

== Literature ==
Shahuji I patronized learning and promoted literature. There are some dramas (koothu) in manuscript in the Thanjavur library which belong to this period. A large number of high-quality Sanskrit works were produced during this period. Dharmakuta heaps praises on Shahuji I. Tryambaka Raya Makhi gave a new interpretation to the Ramayana. Venkata Krishna Dikshitar who was a court-poet of Shahuji I composed Natesa Vijayam. Apart from this, Bhaskara Dikshit wrote Ratnatulika while Veda Kavi wrote Vidya Parinayam and Jivananda

In 1693, Shahuji I renamed Thiruvisanallur as Shahajirajapuram and made a gift of this village to 46 Pandits of his court. This village soon emerged as the hub of literary, art and architectural activity.

Bhulokadevendra Vilasam, Athirupavathi Kalyanam, Sankaranarayana Kalyanam, Chandrikahasa Vilasa Natakam, Koravanji and Vishnu saharasraja vilasam are some works in Tamil drama which belong to this period. However, almost all Tamil works of Shahuji's period indicate a decline in quality. The usual plot is that some princess falls in love with Sahendra or Shahuji and secures him at last. The king is described in them as a linguist and a conqueror. Besides these, there are a few stray pieces praising Ekoji, Shahuji and Serfoji.

There are also some Telugu works from this period which are also lower in quality when compared to those of the Nayak period. Sahasraja vilasa nataka narrates how Shahuji I defeated the Muslim sultans and conquered all lands up to Varanasi. Vishnu sahasraja vilasam is a Tamil koothu written in Telugu script.

== Later life ==
According to the Advaita Kirtana, Shahuji I abdicated the throne in 1712 and became a yogi. He was succeeded by his brother Serfoji I.

== See also ==
- Bhonsle
- Maratha Empire
- List of Maratha dynasties and states
- Thanjavur Maratha kingdom

Shahuji I Thanjavur Marathas
Preceded by Ekoji I	Raja of Thanjavur; 1684-1712	Succeeded by Serfoji I
