= Thanjavur Maratha kingdom =

Principality in Southern India

- 1674–1855
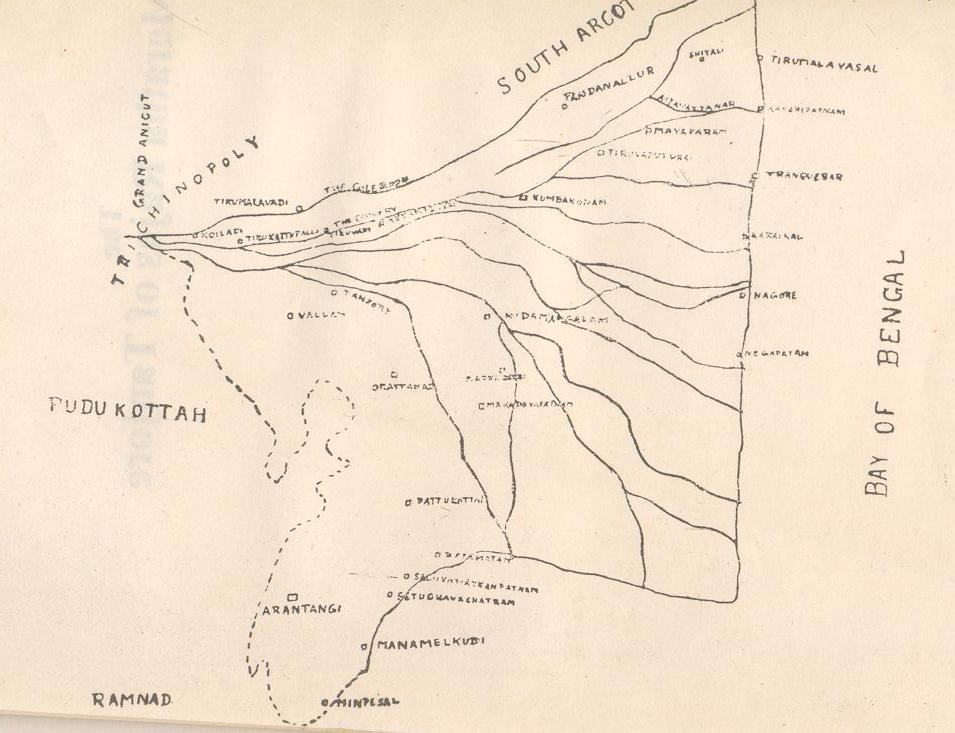
- Map of Tanjore

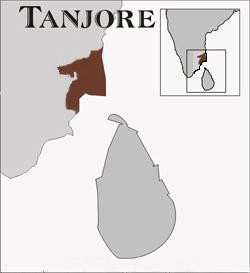
- Approximate extent of the Thanjavur Kingdom, at the time of its accession to the British in 1798
- Capital: Tanjore
- Common languages: Tamil, Telugu,Marathi, Sanskrit
- Religion: Hinduism
- Government: Principality
- Raja
  - (first) 1674 - 1684: Venkoji
  - (last) 1832 - 1855: Shivaji II of Thanjavur
- History
  - Conquest of the Madurai Nayak Kingdom by Venkoji: April 1674
  - Disestablished: 1855
Preceded by	Succeeded by
Thanjavur Nayak kingdom; Ramnad estate	Company rule in India
- Today part of: India

The Thanjavur Maratha kingdom, ruled by the Bhonsle dynasty, was a South Indian Monarchy that governed the Kaveri delta from 1675 to 1855. It was established by Maratha general Ekoji I (Vyankoji Bhosale), with its capital at Thanjavur. The royal court patronized art and literature, with Thanjavur Marathi developing as the dialect of the administrative elite.

== History ==
=== Background and Maratha conquest (1674–1676) ===
Following the end of Chola rule in 1279, the Kaveri delta passed to the Pandyas. The region was subsequently targeted during the 14th-century campaigns of Delhi Sultanate. Regional Pandya authority was restored until the territory was incorporated into the Vijayanagara Empire in the late 14th-century. Vijayanagara Emperors appointed military governors (nayakas) belonging to the Telugu Balija community to govern Madurai and Tanjavur. In 1673, territorial and dynastic friction between Chokkanatha Nayak of Madurai and Vijayaraghava Nayaka of Thanjavur escalated into open war, resulting in the defeat of Thanjavur.

During the 1673 invasion, Vijayaraghava was killed and Chokkanatha installed his foster-brother Alagiri as governor. When Alagiri declared independence the following year, Vijayaraghava Nayaka's son appealed to Bijapur Sultanate for intervention. In 1675, the Sultan of Bijapur dispatched an army commanded by the Maratha general Venkoji Bhonsle (Ekoji I) to recover the province. After defeating Alagiri at Ayyampet, Venkoji occupied Thanjavur. Rather than restoring a Nayaka claimant, he assumed personal sovereign power in early 1676, founding the Bhonsle dynasty of Thanjavur.

=== Early rulers and consolidation (1676–1736) ===
Venkoji (r. 1676–1684), a half-brother of the Maratha king Shivaji, was the first ruler of Thanjavur Maratha line. During his southern Carnatic expedition in 1677, Shivaji occupied Gingee and advanced toward Kaveri. This compelled Venkoji to enter negotiations and assign territories north of Kollidam river to his commander Santaji. Toward the end of his reign, Venkoji allied with Chokkanatha Nayaka of Madurai to repulse an invasion by the Kingdom of Mysore.

Venkoji was succeeded by his eldest son, Shahuji I (r. 1684–1712), who ascended the throne as a minor aged twelve. As Mughal armies advanced through the Carnatic during the siege of Jinji, Shahuji was forced to pay annual tribute to Mughal commanders to protect the delta from devastation. His reign also involved border conflicts with Madurai and the Sethupathis of Ramnad. Shahuji was succeeded by his brother Serfoji I (r. 1712–1728). His administration intervened in the Marava war of succession in Ramnad, securing territorial concessions east of the Pambar River.

Tukkoji (r. 1728–1736), the youngest son of Venkoji, faced initial incursions by Chanda Sahib which he repulsed.

=== Succession conflicts and Carnatic Wars (1736–1773) ===
Following Tukkoji's death, succession disputes destabilized the kingdom until his son Pratapsingh (r. 1739–1763) secured the throne. During the Carnatic Wars, Pratapsingh allied with Muhammad Ali Khan Wallajah, the Nawab of Arcot, and the British East India Company against the French forces. In 1762, British mediation resulted in a tripartite treaty that imposed a fixed annual tribute payable by Thanjavur to the Nawab of Arcot. This placed the kingdom in political subordination.

Pratapsingh was succeeded by Thuljaji (r. 1763–1787). In 1773, troops of the Nawab of Arcot and the East India Company occupied Thanjavur. The king was deposed until the court of directors ordered his reinstatement in 1776, with a condition of housing a British subsidiary garrison.

=== Serfoji II, modernization, and British annexation (1787–1855) ===
Upon Thuljaji's death in 1787, his adopted son Serfoji II was sidelined by his uncle Amarsingh, who assumed the throne. Supported by his missionary tutor Christian Friedrich Schwarz and British officials, Serfoji II was confirmed as the rightful heir in 1798. Under the treaty of 1799, Serfoji ceded civil and military administration to the Company. The treaty had provision for him receiving a state pension and retaining personal jurisdiction over the Thanjavur for complex until his death in 1832.

Shivaji (r. 1832–1855) was the final titular Raja of Thanjavur. Following his death without a biological male heir in October 1855, Governor-General Lord Dalhousie refused to recognize his adopted nephew. The British annexed the titular principality to the Madras Presidency under the Doctrine of Lapse.

== Administration ==
The administration was headed by the monarch, assisted by a council of ministers. This council was led by the dalavoy, who held executive authority over military affairs. Revenue and civil matters were directed by the pradhani (finance minister) and ministerial portfolios were frequently held by Dabir Pandits. The kingdom was divided administratively into five major provinces (subahs): Pattukkottai, Mayiladuthurai, Kumbakonam, Mannargudi and Thiruvaiyaru, which were further subdivided into seemais and māganāms.

== Economy ==
The state revenues were derived principally from agrarian taxation assessed on the region's paddy yield. The tax was collected through village-level intermediaries, known as mirasdars or puttackdars. Cultivable delta lands were largely held by landed proprietors and religious endowments. The revenue was remitted partly in grain and partly in cash.

External trade operated through coastal ports such as Nagapattinam and Nagore, alongside Danish-held Tranquebar. European companies leased trading posts and paid annual customs duties to the court. The circulating coinage included the chakram (or pon), pegged at roughly 1.75 Company rupees. Other coinage included gold pagoda (valued at 3.5 Company rupees) and copper or silver fractional denominations known as panams.

== Literature and culture ==
The Thanjavur Maratha rulers patronized multilingual literary compositions in Marathi, Sanskrit, Telugu, and Tamil.

1. Tamil (the popular language of the Thanjavur region)
2. Telugu (the language of the preceding Nayaka rulers)
3. Marathi (the language of the court elite)
4. Sanskrit (the liturgical language of the Vedic Scriptures)

The notable Marathi authors from the Thanjavur Maratha kingdom include Raghunatha Pandita, Ananda-tanaya, Gosavi-nandana and Subhan Rao. They mainly composed devotional songs, biographical accounts of the ruling family, adapatations of Puranic narratives and the splendours of Thanjavur.

In 1693, Shahuji I granted the village of Thiruvisanallur (renamed Shahaji-raja-puram) as an agraharam to forty-five Sanskrit scholars and poets. These scholars included Ramabhadra Dikshita, Bhaskara Dikshita, Veda-kavi, Mahadeva-kavi, and the polymath Shridhara Venkatesha Ayyaval. Shahuji's minister Tryambaka-yajvan authored the Sanskrit-language texts Dharmakuta (a commentary on Ramayana) and the behavorial treatise Strī-dharma-paddhati. Other compositions from this period included the musical drama Shaha-vilasa-gita by Dhundhiraja and Sanskrit Champus written by the members of the ministerial family.

Serfoji II reorganized and significantly expanded the palace manuscript collection into the modern Saraswathi Mahal Library, acquiring thousands of European printed volumes and palm-leaf manuscripts across multiple disciplines. His personal scholarship extended to European and classical languages, and he also established a Devanagari printing press within the palace complex in 1805.

== List of rulers ==
List of Bhonsle Maratha dynasty rulers of Thanjavur
S. no	Ruler	Reign (CE)
1	Venkoji Bhonsle	1674–1684
2	Shahuji Bhonsle	1684–1712
3	Serfoji Bhonsle I	1712–1728
4	Tukkoji Bhonsle	1728–1736
5	Ekoji II	1736–1737
6	Sujana Bai	1737–1738
7	Shahuji II	1738–1739
8	Pratapsingh Bhonsle	1739–1763
9	Thuljaji Bhonsle	1763–1773 and 1776–1787
10	Serfoji Bhonsle II	1787–1793 and 1798–1832
11	Amar Singh	1793–1798
12	Shivaji Bhonsle	1832–1855

== Family tree ==
Family tree of Maratha Rajas of Thanjavur
Biological Child
Adopted Child

Vyankoji I^{(1)} r. 1675-1684
Shahuji I^{(2)} r. 1684-1712	Serfoji I^{(3)} r. 1712-1728	Tukkoji^{(4)} r. 1728-1736
Shahuji II^{(7)} r. 1738-1739	Sujana Bai^{(6)} r. 1737-1738	Vyankoji II^{(5)} r. 1736-1737	Pratap; Singh^{(8)} r. 1739-1763
Thuljaji^{(9)} r. 1763-1773, 1776-1787	Amar Singh^{(11)} r. 1793-1798
Serfoji II^{(10)} r. 1787-1793, 1798-1832
Shivaji^{(12)} r. 1832-1855
Muktamba; Bai^{(13)} – Titular – r. 1855-1885
Shambusinghji; Rao^{(14)} – Titular – r. 1885-1891

== See also ==
- Maratha Empire
- List of Maratha dynasties and states
- Thanjavur Marathi people
