= Vyankoji Bhosale =

Raja of Thanjavur from 1675 to 1684

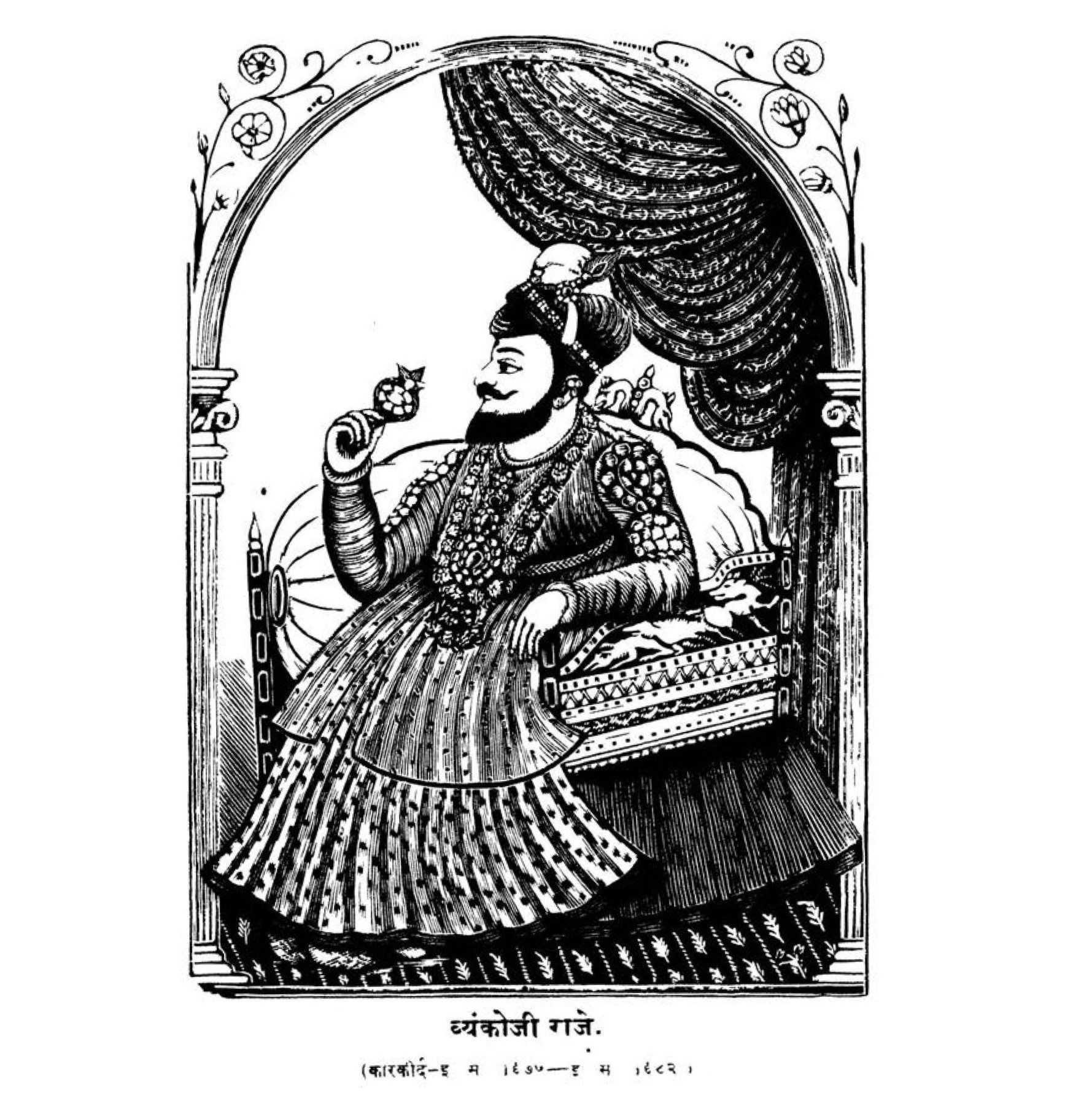

Raja of Thanjavur
- Reign: 1674–1684
- Predecessor: Shahaji
- Successor: Shahuji I

Jagirdar of Bangalore in Bijapur Sultanate
- Predecessor: Shahaji
- Successor: Shivaji
- Born: c. 1632
- Died: c. 1686 (aged 53–54)
- House: Bhonsle
- Father: Shahaji
- Mother: Tukabai
- Religion: Hinduism

Vyankojirajah Bhonsle (1632–1686) or Ekoji I Bhonsle was the younger half-brother of Shivaji and founder of Maratha rule in Thanjavur in modern-day Tamil Nadu. He was the progenitor of the junior branch (cadet branch) of the Bhonsle family which ruled Thanjavur until the formal annexation of the kingdom by the British East India Company in 1855.

== Early career ==
Venkoji was the younger son of Shahaji, a military commander in service of the Sultan of Bijapur through his younger wife Tukabai Mohite. He succeeded to the Karnataka portion of Shahaji's jagir, that is Bengaluru and Thanjavur.

== Conquest of Thanjavur ==
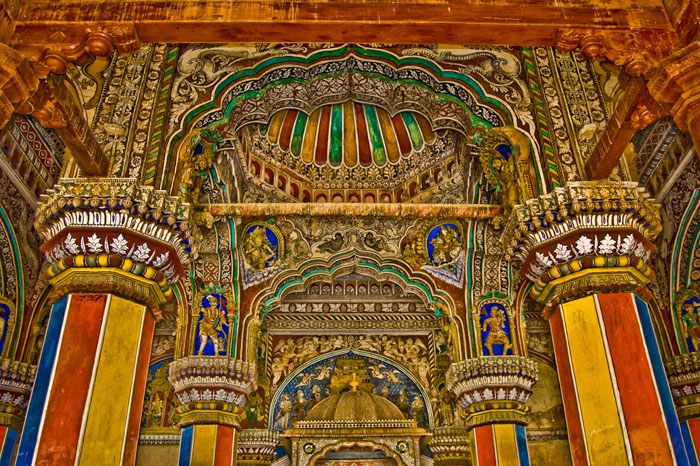
Interior of Durbar Hall, Thanjavur Maratha palace

In 1673, the Nayak of Madurai invaded the kingdom of Thanjavur under the rule of the Thanjavur Nayaks and drove away the ruler. He then proceeded to place his younger brother Alagiri Nayak on the throne of Thanjavur. This was resented by Rayasam Venkanna, a high-ranking official in the court of Thanjavur who supported the cause of Chengamala Dasu, the deposed son of Vijayaraghava, the late Nayak of Thanjavur. He proceeded to the court of Ali Adil Shah II of Bijapur along with the minor Chengamaladas and requested his help.

The Adil Shah sent Venkoji to invade Thanjavur and restore the throne to the old line of nayaks. A Sanskrit manuscript Bosalavamsavali narrates how Venkoji conquered Arni and proceeded to Thanjavur to liberate it from the shackles of the Nayak of Tiruchirapalli. The manuscript further narrates that While camping at Tirumalapadi near Tiruvadi, God appeared to him in a dream and asked him not to leave for home. However, Wilkes assigns different reasons for the usurpation by the Maratha, Venkoji. He is of the view that Venkoji was not pleased with the conduct of Chengamaladas who refused to pay the war expenses.

Assisted by Rayasam Venkanna who had switched sides once more, Venkoji conquered Ayyampettai and defeated Alagiri who had now also fallen out with his brother Chokkanatha Nayak as well as Changamaldas and secured the throne for himself. On the death of the Sultan of Bijapur, he crowned himself as the independent king of Thanjavur.

== Reign ==
=== Dates of Ekoji I's reign ===
The Marathi inscriptions of the Thanjavur temple dates the capture of Thanjavur to January 1676. The Madras Tamil manuscript assigns the dates 1675 and 1679 to the conquest and end of Ekoji I's reign respectively. Likewise, the Marathi inscriptions assigns Ekoji's death to 1684. However, Wilkes asserts that Ekoji was well alive in 1686–1687. The records of the British East India Company mention a king called Ekoji as late as 1699–1700.

However, Dharmakuta a commentary on the Ramayana suggests that Ekoji might have abdicated in the year 1684 in favor of his son Shahuji. However, it is quite unclear as to how many years he lived after the event.

=== Clash with Shivaji ===
In 1676–1677, Chhatrapati Shivaji Maharaj made an expedition to the Carnatic to claim his portion of the jagir, also desiring to bring the whole of South India under Maratha rule. With this aim in mind, he made a treaty with Golconda, took Gingee and proceeded to Thanjavur after conquering all the lands north of the Coleroon river. Shivaji camped on the north bank of Kollidam River 10 miles north of Thanjavur and invited Ekoji for discussions. Shivaji did not try to cross this distributary of Kaveri, to give a clear signal to his brother that he wanted to settle the matters of inheritance amicably. Shivaji claimed a right to Shahji's inheritance. It was an Ekoji's minister Raghunath Pant Hanumante who had brought this matter of inheritance to Shivaji's notice. Although Shivaji was initially quite unwilling to state a claim on his father's jagir, but eventually he accepted the idea to achieve higher goals for Swarajya. Before visiting Shivaji sometime in January 1677 at Satara, Raghunath Pant Hanumante had visited Golconda and had drawn out a golden leaf of diplomacy. He met Qutub Shah's Brahmin ministers Akanna and Madanna and all three had a consensus on the expansion of Swarajya. Raghunath Pant's brother Janardan Pant Hanumante was in Shivaji's service. He pressed upon Qutub Shah to have a friendship treaty with Shivaji. Qutub Shah was much willing as he was under pressure from both Bijapur and the Mughals. Shivaji's approach to Tanjore was thus preceded by a long circuitous march through Bijapur territory to Golconda and then directly southwards. The two brothers stayed together more than a week and had lengthy discussions. While Shivaji pressed for a division of jagir, Ekoji remained tight lipped and noncommittal. One night he secretly arranged for a barge and fled the camp. Pained Shivaji decided to turn back to Raigad avoiding an open conflict with his brother. Administration and control of the newly conquered territories was left with his Sarnaubat Hambir Rao Mohite and others like Harji Raje Mahadik, Santaji Ghorpade, Vitthal Pildev Atre and Raghunath Pant Hanumate himself; with Gingee as the centre of new territories. Ekoji I reacted by launching regular military campaigns into Santoji's territory with the intention of driving him away. However, Shivaji's army handed him a crushing defeat taking many prisoners. Ekoji himself fled. This confrontation took place near Valikandapuram on 16 November 1677. Shivaji got this news, when he was at Gadag on his way back. He wrote a letter of retribution, but still expressing his will for a reconciliation on 1 March 1678. Meanwhile, he had a correspondence with Raghunath Pant. A very hesitant Ekoji succumbed to his weak military position and his wife Deepabai's strong persuasion. Ultimately, Ragunath Pant was invited from Gingee for discussions. Raghunath Pant enjoyed full confidence of Shivaji and knew his heart and mind and his future plans and intentions. Accordingly, a 19-point treaty was drafted and sent to Shivaji for his ratification. Shivaji signed the same. The core of this treaty was (1) All the Bijapur territory claimed to be under Shahji's jagir and which was recently won by Shivaji was returned to Deepabai (territories around Bangalore with an annual revenue of 2 lac hons) and Ekoji (region of 7 lac hons around Tanjor). (2) Ekoji was weaned away from the Bijapur's Adilshahi and his Muslim advisers as he was forbidden from Harbouring any anti Hindu element in his realm (Article 6). Article 17 stated that Raghunath Pant would have ancestral jagir of 1 lac hons; underlining Raghunath Pant's vital role in Dakshin Digvijay. However, in 1680, Bijapur succumbed to the invasions of Shivaji Maharaj and handed over the administration of all lands to the north of the Coleroon river to Shivaji Maharaj. Ekoji I was forced to become a vassal of Shivaji Maharaj and pay him tribute. On the death of Shivaji Maharaj, however, the tribute was stopped and Thanjavur retained its independent existence.

=== Alliance with Ramnad ===
The chiefs of Ramnad had been vassals of the Nayaks of Madurai. However, the new ruler, Kilavan desired to become independent. With this aim in mind, he concluded an alliance with Ekoji and rebelled against his overlord. The battle ended in the victory of Shahuji I, the defeat of Madurai and the liberation of Ramnad.

== Literature ==
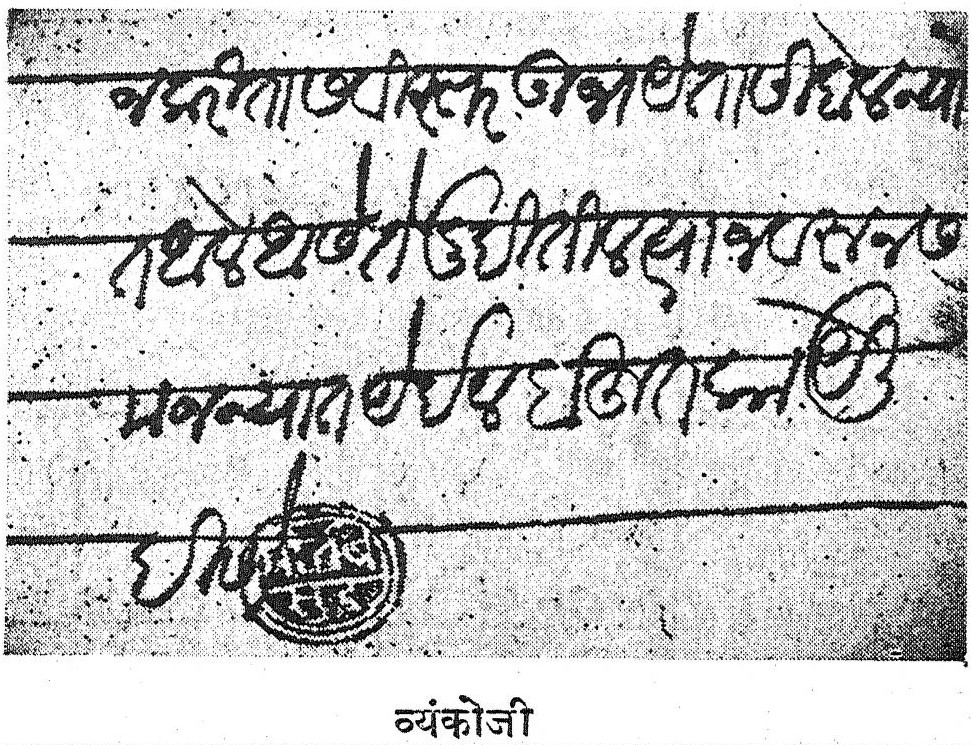
Handwriting of Vyankoji Bhosale

Sanskrit, Tamil and Telugu literature flourished during this period. Venkoji himself is said to have composed a Telugu version of the Ramayana.

== See also ==
- Maratha Empire
- List of Maratha dynasties and states
- Thanjavur Maratha kingdom
- Malleshwaram, Bengaluru Inscriptions

Vyankoji Bhosale Thanjavur Marathas
Preceded by Alagiri Nayak	Raja of Thanjavur; 1675-1684	Succeeded by Shahuji I
