= Bhonsle (clan) =

Maratha clan

- Maratha clan
- Ethnicity: Deccan-Marathi
- Location: Maharashtra, Tamil Nadu
- Language: Marathi
- Religion: Hinduism

The Bhonsle (or Bhonsale, Bhosale, Bhosle) are a prominent group within the Maratha clan system of India.

== History ==
=== Earliest members ===
The earliest accepted members of the Bhonsles are Mudhoji Bhonsle and his kin Rupaji Bhonsle, who were the village headman (pāṭīl) of Hingani — this branch has been since known as Hinganikar Bhonsles. A branch seem to have split soon, who went on to claim an ancestral right to the post of district steward (deśmukhī) of Kadewalit: Suryaji Bhonsle during the reign of Ahmad Nizam Shah I (early 1490s), and his son Sharafji Bhonsle during the conquest of the region by Daniyal Mirza (1599). (Note: The precise familial relation between Mudhoji/Rupali and Suryaji is unclear.) (Note: Stewart Gordon and other scholars deem the "deśmukhī" to have served as a 'hinge' between the local populace and the imperial authority which frequently changed. Without their loyalty, commanding authority in newly conquered territories was difficult.) This branch has been since known as Kadewalit Bhonsles.

The next significant Bhonsle was probably Maloji Bhosale from the Hinganikar branch. He was the great-grandson of one Kheloji (c. 1490).

=== Origins ===
In the opinion of Jadunath Sarkar and other scholars, Bhonsles were predominantly Deccani tiller-plainsmen from the Shudra caste; they were part of the Marathas/Kunbis, an amorphous class-group. (Note: Susan Bayly and Eraly however emphasize that the Marathas were located outside the peripheries of Brahminism and people thereof did not form any rigid caste.) Scholars have however disagreed about the agricultural status of Bhosles. Rosalind O'Hanlon notes that the historical evolution of castes grouped under the Maratha-Kunbis is sketchy. Ananya Vajpeyi rejects the designation of Shudra, since the category has remained in a state of flux across centuries; she instead notes them to be a Marathi lineage, who enjoyed "reasonably high" social status as landholders and warlords, being in the service of Deccan Sultanate or Mughals. (Note: Vajpeyi however notes that the Bhonsles almost-certainly never featured in the traditional list of 96 families, which allegedly composed the Maratha identity.)

According to R. C. Dhere's interpretation of local oral history and ethnography, Bhonsles descend from the Hoysalas and Yadavas of Devagiri, who were cow-herding Gavli sovereigns. (Note: This was published in "Sikhar Singanapurca Sri Sambhu Mahadev" (2002) for the first time.) (Note: The caste-status of these Yadavas and whether they were a part of Bahminical hiearchy is disputed.) In early thirteenth century, "Baliyeppa Gopati Sirsat", a Hoysala cousin of Simhana migrated from Gadag to Satara along with his pastoral herd and kul-devta; the Sambhu Mahadev was thus installed at a hill-top in Singhnapur. (Note: The Hoysalas as well as the Yadavas were competing feudatories of the Chalukyas with battles being as much common as matrimonial alliances. The migration was prob. motivated by pervasive droughts in the region and an opportunity to seek out some independence for himself.) (Note: The shrine continues to serve as one of the most significant Shaivite shrine in modern Maharashtra.) Historical records indicate that this shrine received extensive patronage from Maloji onwards. (Note: Texts produced under patronage of Shahaji make explicit connection between the Bhosales and Balip. Also, the "samadhi" (memorial) of Sambhaji, Shivaji, and Shahuji neighbor the shrine. However, for a span of about 250 years — from Balip to Kheloji — the history of the shrine is not clear.) Further, there exists a branch of the Bhosles named "Sirsat Bhosles" and Bhosle (or "Bhosale") is linguistically similar to "Hoysala". M. K. Dhavalikar found the work to convincingly explain the foundation of the Bhosle clan (as well as Sambhu Mahadev cult). Vajpeyi too advocates that Dhere's theory be probed in greater detail — "[f]rom pastoralist big men to warlords on horseback, is not an impossible distance to cover in two to three centuries."

==== Shivaji and his claim of Rajput origin ====
By 1670s, Shivaji had acquired extensive territory and wealth from his campaigns. But, lacking a formal crown, he had no operational legitimacy to rule his de facto domain and technically, remained subject to his Mughal (or Deccan Sultanate) overlords; in the hierarchy of power, Shivaji's position remained similar to fellow Maratha chieftains. (Note: Most of the great Maratha Jahagirdar families in the service of Adilshahi strongly opposed Shivaji in his early years. These included families such as the Ghadge, More, Mohite, Ghorpade, Shirke, and Nimbalkar.) Also, he was often opposed by the orthodox Brahmin community of Maharashtra. A coronation sanctioned by the Brahmins was thus planned, in a bid to proclaim sovereignty and legitimize his rule.

On proposing the Brahmins of his court to have him proclaimed as the rightful king, a controversy erupted: the regnal status was reserved for those belonging to the kshatriya varna. Not only was there a fundamental dispute among scholars on whether any true Kshatriya survived in the Kali Yuga, (Note: Madhav Deshpande notes that one of the oldest texts in support of such a viewpoint was drafted by Kamalakara Bhatta, a paternal uncle of Gaga Bhatta. However, he was hardly a radical (unlike Nagesbhatta, to whom even the Rajputs were Shudras) and allowed expiatory rites for the rare "fallen" Kshatriya-Shudras, provided he did not exceed the upanayana age-limit of 22 years. In his judgement, he was following his father Ramkrsna Bhatta as well as grandfather Narayana Bhatta.) having been all destroyed by Parashurama but also Shivaji's grandfather was a tiller-headman, Shivaji did not wear the sacred thread, and his marriage was not in accordance with the Kshatriya customs. Thus, the Brahmins had him categorised as a shudra.

Compelled to postpone his coronation, Shivaji had his secretary Balaji Avji Chitnis sent to the Sisodiya Rajputs of Mewar for inspection of the royal genealogies; Avji returned with a favorable finding — Shahji turned out to be a descendant of Chacho Sisodiya, a half-Rajput uncle of Mokal Singh. (Note: Chacho was born of a Khati concubine and in contemporary times, was pejoratively referred to as a khātanvālā. People like Chacho were categorized into separate caste-groups at the lower end of the hierarchy—even unfit for inter-dining with—, and excluded from Rajput ganayats.) Gaga Bhatt, a famed Brahmin of Banaras, (Note: Gaga Bhatt was a preeminent legal scholar, whose scholarship focused on the relative status of different varnas across different regions. Shivaji was already in contact with him since 1664, when he was asked to adjudicate upon whether the Saraswat Brahmins (then, Syenavis) were indeed Brahmins. It is very plausible that the idea of coronation was Bhatt's suggestion — during the previous encounter, he had already proclaimed Shivaji to have been born into a "pure royal family".) was then hired to ratify Chitnis' find, and the Bhonsles were now permitted to stake a claim to Kshatriya caste. (Note: Susan Bayly views the episode to reflect fluidity in the caste system.) The coronation would be re-executed in June 1674 but only after going through a long list of preludes. (Note: Contemporary Dutch East India Company archives indicate that even then, Shivaji's upgradation of status was only accepted by Brahmins after he had promised them to not rule tyrannically anymore.)

Led by Bhatt, who employed traditional Hindu imagery in an unprecedented scale, the first phase had Shivaji penance for having lived as a Maratha despite being a Kshatriya. Then came the sacred thread ceremony ('maunjibandhanam') followed by remarriage according to Rajput customs ('mantra-vivah') and a sequence of Vedic rituals before the eventual coronation ('abhisheka') — a public spectacle of enormous expense that heralded the rebirth of Shivaji as a Kshatriya king. (Note: The expense was huge enough to impose a coronation tax on his subjects for the next few years.) Panegyrics composed by court-poets during these spans (and afterward) reinforced onto the public memory that Shivaji (and the Bhonsles) indeed belonged from the Sisodiyas.

However, the Kshatriyization was not unanimous; a section of Brahmins continued to deny the Kshatriya status. Brahmins of the Peshwa period rejected Bhatt's acceptance of Shivaji's claims and blamed the non-dharmic coronation for all ills that plagued Shivaji and his heirs—in tune with the general Brahminical sentiment to categorize all Marathas as Shudras, carte-blanche; there have been even claims that Bhatt was excommunicated by Maratha Brahmins for his role in the coronation of Shivaji! Interestingly, all claims to Rajput ancestry had largely vanished from the family's subsequent projections of identity.

==== Accuracy ====
Vajpeyi notes the "veridical status" of Chitnis' finds to be not determinable to "historical certainty" — the links were tenuous at best and inventive at worst. According to some claims, Shivaji was a Rajput of the Sisodia Rajput clan while other claims say that he was a Kunbi Maratha and the sole purpose of the lineage claim as a Rajput was to guarantee Shivaji's consecration as a Kshatriya, in a tactic that had clear parallels to Rajputisation. (Note: She however cautions that the summary rejection of Shivaji's ancestry claims in contemporary historiographical literature often stemmed from a Brahminical anti-Maratha perspective, imbibed from the Peshwas.) Jadunath Sarkar deemed that the genealogy was cleverly fabricated by Balaji Awji and after some reluctance accepted by Gaga Bhatt, who in turn was "rewarded with a huge fee". V. K. Rajwade, Dhere, Allison Busch, John Keay and Audrey Truschke also agree with Sarkar about the fabrication. G. S. Sardesai notes that the descent is "not authentically proved". (Note: Sardesai noted that the claims were supported by some 'firman's in possession of the Raja of Mudhol but many scholars [unidentified] considered them to be forged.) Stewart N. Gordon does not pass any judgement but notes Bhatt to be a "creative Brahmin". (Note: Gordon however points out that Shivaji might have "thought of himself as a Rajput" since long back. He evidences a letter (1656) sent by Shahji to Adil Shah II where they had boasted of Rajput pride and another letter (18 July 1666) from Parkaldas (an officer under Jai Singh) to Kalyandas, where three Rajput chieftains are noted to be admiring of Shivaji as a great Rajput with all the "characteristic qualities". Vajpeyi interprets the former use to signify an exalted royal status rather than any connection with the Rajput clans. A. Sievler deems the latter translation to be dubious; Mehendale comments that "Rajput" simply meant a Kshatriya in the context. In another contemporary source—a letter from Jai Singh himself to his Prime Minister—, we see Shivaji being regarded to belong from a low caste (and pedigree), who was not even fit for inter-dining with Rajputs.) André Wink deems that the Sisodia genealogical claim is destined to remain disputed forever. (Note: In a footnote, Wink mentions of two letters before the coronation ceremony, where Shivaji had referred to himself as a Rajput.)

=== Princely States ===
Satara State, Kolhapur State, Thanjavur State, Nagpur State, Akkalkot State, Sawantwadi State and Barshi were amongst the prominent states ruled by the Bhonsles.

== See also ==
- List of Maratha dynasties and states
