= List of wars in the Indian subcontinent =

This is a list of known battles, wars, and conflicts in the Indian subcontinent before the beginning of British Indian Empire in 1858 CE.

== Ancient India (c. 15th to 1st century BCE) ==
Name of conflict	Belligerents	Belligerents	Outcome
Battle of the Ten Kings (c. 14th century BCE)	Bharatas	Ten King Alliance	Bharatas Victory: Bharatas settle in Kurukshetra.; Emergence of Kuru kingdom.
Kurukshetra War	Pandavas of Kuru kingdom	Kauravas of Kuru kingdom	Pandavas Victory: Kuru dominance in North and Central India.
Kosala-Kashi war (c. 650 BCE)	Kosala kingdom	Kasi kingdom	Kosala Victory: Kosala annexation of Kāsī
Kosala conquest of Gaṇasaṅghas (c. 600 to 550 BCE)	Kosala kingdom	Gaṇasaṅghas: Kālāma; Shakya; Koliya	Kosala Victory: Kosala annexation of three Gaṇasaṅghas
Gandhāra-Avanti war (c. 575 BCE)	Gandhāra kingdom	Avanti: Pradyota dynasty	Gandhāra Victory: Pushkarasarin of Gandhāra defeated Pradyota of Avanti
Magadha-Anga war (c. 535 BCE)	Magadha: Haryanka dynasty	Anga Kingdom	Magadha Victory: Magadhan annexation of Anga
Achaemenid conquest of the Indus Valley (c. 535/518BCE–450 BCE)	Mahajanapadas: Gandhara; Sindhu-Sauvīra; Kambojas	Achaemenid Empire	Achaemenid Victory: Persian rule established over the northwestern regions of the Indian subcontinent
Avanti-Magadhan wars (c. 510 BCE–400 BCE)	Magadha: Haryanka dynasty; Shishunga dynasty	Avanti kingdom	Magadha Victory: Magadhan annexation of Avanti
Magadha-Kosala war (c. Late 5th century BCE)	Kosala kingdom	Magadha: Haryanka dynasty	Magadha Victory: Magadhan annexation of Kosala and Kasi
Magadha-Vajji war (c. 484 BCE–468 BCE)	Magadha: Haryanka dynasty	Vajjika League led by the Licchavis	Magadha Victory: Magadhan annexation of Vajji confederacy
Indian campaign of Alexander the Great (c. 327 BCE–325 BCE): Battle of the Hydaspes	Macedonian Empire: League of Corinth; Persian allies; Indian allies	North-western Indian Kingdoms: Aśvaka; Guraeans; Pauravas; Mallians; Oxydracians; Amvastha	Partial Macedon Victory: Macedonia conquers up to the Beas River, yet has to stop its advance in the Indus.
Nanda conquest of Northern India (c. 4th century BCE)	Magadha: Nanda dynasty	North Indian states: Maithalas; Kasheyas; Ikshvakus; Panchalas; Shurasenas; Kurus; Haihayas; Vitihotras; Kalingas; Ashmakas	Nanda Victory: Expansion of the Nanda Empire in Northern India.
Mauryan conquest of the Nanda Empire (c. 323 BCE–322 BCE)	Magadha: Nanda dynasty	House of Maurya	Maurya Victory: Fall of Nanda dynasty.; Consolidation of the Maurya dynasty
Chandragupta's conquest of North-western India (322-317 BCE)	Magadha: Maurya dynasty	Alexander's governors and their states: Nicanor; Philip	Mauryan Victory: Mauryan annexation of North-western India.
Chandragupta's conquest of Deccan (4th century BCE)	Magadha: Maurya dynasty	Southern states	Mauryan Victory
Seleucid–Mauryan war (c. 305 BCE–303 BCE)	Magadha: Maurya dynasty	Seleucid Empire	Maurya Victory: Maurya annexation of all of the Macedonian Satrapies in the Indus River Valley along with conquest of Persian territories such as Arachosia, Gedrosia and Paropamisadae by the Mauryans
Kalinga War (c. 262 BCE–261 BCE)	Magadha: Maurya dynasty	Kalinga kingdom	Maurya Victory: Maurya annexation of Kalinga
Shunga-Greek War (2nd Century BCE)	Magadha: Shunga dynasty	Greco-Bactrian kingdom	Shunga Victory
Early Chola invasion of Anuradhapura: Battle of Vijithapura (c. 162/161 BCE)	Chola dynasty	Anuradhapura Kingdom	Anuradhapura Victory
Shunga-Vidarbha War (145 BCE)	Magadha: Shunga dynasty	Vidarbha kingdom	Shunga Victory

== Classical India (c. 1st to 6th century CE) ==
Name of conflict	Belligerents	Belligerents	Outcome
Saka–Satavahana Wars (c. 1st–2nd century CE)	Satavahana Empire	Western Kshatrapas	Satvahana Victory
Battle of Venni (c. 130 CE)	Cholas (Uraiyur)	Chera dynasty Pandya dynasty Velir	Chola Victory
Parthian–Kushan War (between c. 130 CE to c. 140 CE)	Kushan Empire	Parthian Empire	Kushan Victory
Early Samudragupta's conquest Northern India (c. 4th century CE)	Gupta Empire	3 kings of Aryavarta	Gupta Victory
Samudragupta's conquest of Northern India (c. 4th century CE)	Gupta Empire	8 kings of Aryavarta	Gupta Victory
Samudragupta's conquest of Southern India (c. 4th century CE)	Gupta Empire	12 kings of Dakshinapatha	Gupta Victory
Samudragupta's conquests of Central India (c. 4th century CE)	Gupta Empire	Parivrajaka dynasty	Gupta Victory
Gupta–Saka Wars (c. 375 to 413 CE)	Gupta Empire	Western Satraps	Gupta Victory
Chandragupta II's conquest of Bengal (c. 4th century)	Gupta Empire	Vanga	Gupta Victory
Chandragupta II's conquest Balkh (Punjab and Afghanistan) (c. 4th century to 5th century CE)	Gupta Empire	Balkh states	Indecisive
Kumaragupta I's conquest of South-western India (c. 5th century CE)	Gupta Empire	Traikutaka dynasty	Gupta Victory
Battle of Sondani (528 CE)	Alchon Huns	Aulikaras; Gupta Empire	Gupta and Aulikara victory
Gauda–Gupta War (528 CE)	Gauda Kingdom	Gupta Empire: Later Gupta dynasty; Maukhari dynasty	Gupta and Maukhari victory

== Early Medieval India (c. 7th to 12th century CE) ==
Name of conflict	Belliegents	Opponents	Outcome
Battle of Narmada (619 CE)	Chalukyas of Vatapi	Vardhana dynasty	Chalukya victory: Harshavardhana's South Indian expandation halted; Part of imperial conquest of Pulakeshin II
Battle of Pullalur (618–619 CE)	Chalukyas of Vatapi	Pallava dynasty	Chalukya victory: Result of battle is inconclusive by mostly historians; Part of Chalukya–Pallava Wars
Battle of Manimangala (642 CE)	Chalukyas of Vatapi	Pallava dynasty	Pallava victory: Manimangala is the first ever victory for the Pallavas against the Chalukyas.; Part of Chalukya–Pallava Wars
Battle of Vatapi (642 CE)	Chalukyas of Vatapi	Pallava dynasty	Pallava victory: Pallava victory and conquest of Vatapi; Part of Chalukya–Pallava Wars
Umayyad campaigns in India (712–740 CE)	Indian kingdoms: Gurjara-Pratihara; Guhila dynasty; Maitraka dynasty; Chalukya dynasty; Karkota Empire	Umayyad Caliphate	Indian Victory: Arab and later Muslim invasions halted in India for the next 250 years.
Yaqub's campaigns to the east (861–870)	Zunbils; Kharijites; Indian kingdoms: Hindu Shahis; Buddhist tribal chiefs	Abbasid Caliphate: Saffarid dynasty	Saffarid Victory: Ya'qub ibn al-Layth al-Saffar conquered Bost, Kandahar, Ghazni, Kabul, Bamyan, Balkh and Herat.
Battle of Thirupurambiyam (879)	Chola Empire; Pallava dynasty; Western Gangas	Pandya dynasty; Pallava faction	Chola–Pallava–Ganga victory: Pandyas did not recover for two centuries
Pala-Tibetan War ( 8th-9th CE )	Pala Empire	Tibetan Empire	Pala Victory: Dharmapāla subjugated the throne of Nepal which was under Tibetan rule; Devapāla conquered up to the Himalayan region of Nepal and Tibet; Devapāla successfully conquered the Tibetan principality of Punjab
Ghaznavid campaigns in India (10th and 11th centuries)	Hindu Shahis; Rajput confederacy Jatts; Chandela dynasty Kachchhapaghata dynasty Gurjara-Pratihara dynasty Lodi dynasty of Multan; Tomara dynasty	Ghaznavids	Ghaznavid Victory: Beginning of Muslim rule in the Indian Subcontinent
Chalukya–Chola wars (992–1120 CE)	Chola Empire	Western Chalukya Empire	Chola Victory
Siege of Lohkot (1015)	Ghaznavids	Lohara dynasty	Sangramraja of kashmir defeated Mahmud of Ghazni
Lohara-Ghazni conflict (1021) (1021)	Ghaznavids	Lohara dynasty	Victory for Sangramraja of Kashmir
Devendra-Chalukya wars (1090–1100)	Kingdom of Devendra	Western Chalukya Empire	Inconclusive
Chola conquest of Anuradhapura (993–1017 CE)	Chola Empire	Anuradhapura Kingdom	Chola Victory
Chola Conquest of the Chera Kingdom and Pandya Kingdom (1018–1019 CE)	Chola Empire	Chera dynasty Pandya dynasty	Chola Victory: Cholas annexed the Cheras and Pandyas
Chola expedition to North India (1019–1024 CE)	Chola Empire	Somavamshi dynasty Pala Empire; Kamboja-Pala dynasty Chandra dynasty	Chola victory: Kalinga and Bengal annexed as vassal states of the Chola Empire; Part of imperial conquests of Rajendra Chola I
South-East Asia campaign of Rajendra I (1025-1068 CE)	Chola Empire	Srivijaya; Kadaram; Kingdom of Pegu; Mayirudingam; Langkasuka; Talaittakkolam	Chola Victory: Much of Malay Peninsula sacked and conquered by the Cholas; Expansion of Indian influence & culture into Southeast Asia; Dissolution of Srivijayan mandala; Conquest of Pegu (Burma); Later campaigns in the Philippines by other Cholas; Establishment of Rajahanate of Cebu
Chola invasion of Srivijaya (1025 CE)	Chola Empire	Srivijaya	Chola Victory
Chola invasion of Kadaram (1068 CE)	Chola Empire	Srivijaya: Kadaram	Chola Victory
Sena revolution of Bengal (1070-1165 CE)	Sena dynasty	Pala dynasty Varman Dynasty (Bengal)	Sena victory
Pandyan Civil War (1169-1177 CE)	Chola dynasty Pandya dynasty	Kingdom of Polonnaruwa; Pandya dynasty	Chola Victory: Pandyan civil conflict ends. Rival kingdoms abandon military intervention.; Sinhalese-Vira Pandya alliance lost the war against Cholas
Battle of Nettur (1188 CE)	Chola Empire	Pandyan kingdom	Chola Victory
Indian campaigns of Muhammad of Ghor (1175–1206): Battle of Kasahrada (1178 CE); First Battle of Tarain (1191 CE); Second Battle of Tarain (1192 CE)	Rajput confederacy Sena dynasty Soomra dynasty Ghaznavids; Qarmatians; Tibetan tribes	Ghurid dynasty	Ghurid Victory: Foundation of Delhi Sultanate

== Late Medieval India (c. 13th to 15th century CE) ==
Name of conflict	Belligerents	Belligerents	Outcome
Battle of Kakadadaha (1205)	Chandelas of Jejakabhukti	Ghurid empire	Chandela victory
Mongol invasions of India (1221–1327)	Delhi Sultanate	Chagatai Khanate	Delhi Sultanate Victory: Mongol forces expelled from India
Dehlavi-Ganga War: Second seizure of Lakhnauti; Battles of Umurdan; (1243–1256)	Delhi Sultanate	Eastern Ganga dynasty	Eastern Ganga Victory
Alauddin Khalji's conquest of Ranthambore (1301)	Delhi Sultanate	Chahamanas of Ranastambhapura	Delhi Sultanate Victory
Siege of Chittorgarh (1303)	Delhi Sultanate	Guhila dynasty	Delhi Sultanate Victory
Alauddin Khalji's conquest of Gujarat (1304)	Delhi Sultanate	Vaghela dynasty	Delhi Sultanate Victory
Alauddin Khalji's conquest of Malwa (1305)	Delhi Sultanate	Paramara dynasty	Delhi Sultanate Victory
Alauddin Khalji's conquest of Devagiri (1308)	Delhi Sultanate	Seuna dynasty	Delhi Sultanate Victory
Dehlavi-Kakatiya War (1318–1323)	Delhi Sultanate	Kakatiya dynasty	Delhi Sultanate Victory: End of Kakatiya Empire
Malik Kafur's invasion of the Pandya kingdom (1310–1311)	Delhi Sultanate	Pandya dynasty	Delhi Sultanate Victory
Battle of Lahrawat (1320)	Khusrau Khan's forces	Tughlaq dynasty	Tughlaq Victory
Battle of Singoli (1336)	Kingdom of Mewar	Tughlaq dynasty	Rajput Victory: Rana Hammir Singh defeated Tughlaq Army; Muhammad bin Tughluq taken prisoner
First Ekdala War (1353s)	Delhi Sultanate	Bengal Sultanate	Delhi Sultanate Victory
Second Ekdala War (1359)	Delhi Sultanate	Bengal Sultanate	Bengal Sultanate Victory
Jaunpur-Bhojpur War (1389–1489)	Jaunpur Sultanate	Ujjainiyas of Bhojpur	Jaunpur Sultanate Victory: Ujjainiyas flee into the forest and lead a guerilla warfare resistance.
Timurid campaign of India (1398)	Timurid Empire	Delhi Sultanate	Timurid Empire Victory: Delhi is sacked and looted; End of Tughluq dynasty
Benga–Jaunpur War (1415–1420)	Bengal Sultanate; Diplomatic support: Timurid Empire; Ming China	Jaunpur Sultanate	Bengal Sultanate Victory
Rajput-Malwa War: Battle of Mandalgarh and Banas; Battle of Nagaur(1437–1457)	Kingdom of Mewar; Kingdom of Marwar	Malwa Sultanate; Gujarat Sultanate; Nagaur Sultanate	Rajput Victory: Sultan Mahmud Khalji taken prisoner.; Raisen, Chanderi, Bhilsa, Kalpi, and Ranthambore captured by Mewar.
Battle of Devarkonda (1458)	Gajapati Empire	Bahamani Sultanate	Gajapati Empire victory

== Early Modern India (c. 16th to mid 19th century CE) ==
Name of conflict (Time)	Belligerents	Opponents	Outcome
First Luso-Malabarese War (1500–1513)	Kingdom of Calicut Venice Mamluks	Portugal	Portuguese victory
Portuguese-Mamluk naval war (1505–1517): Battle of Chaul; Battle of Diu; Siege of Jeddah	Mamluk Sultanate Kingdom of Calicut Bijapur Sultanate Gujarat Sultanate Supported by: Republic of Venice Ottoman Empire	Portuguese Empire	Portuguese victory: Start of Ottoman–Portuguese confrontations on the Indian Ocean.; Start of Gujarati–Portuguese conflicts on Indian subcontinent.
Siege of Anjadiva (1506)	Bijapur Sultanate	Portuguese Empire: Portuguese India	Bijapur victory
Battle of Dabul (1508)	Bijapur Sultanate	Portuguese Empire: Portuguese India	Portuguese victory
Gujarati–Portuguese conflicts (1508–1573): Battle of Chaul; Battle of Diu; Siege of Diu (1531); Siege of Diu (1538); Siege of Diu (1546); Battle of Bharuch; Portuguese conquest of Daman; Part of Ottoman–Portuguese conflicts (1538–1559)	Gujarat Sultanate Supported by: Kingdom of Calicut Mamluk Sultanate (until 1517) Ottoman Empire (since 1517)	Portuguese Empire: Portuguese India	Portuguese victory: Establishment of Portuguese Diu.; Treaty of Bassein (1534).; Establishment of Portuguese Bassein.; Establishment of Portuguese Daman.; Consolidation of Portuguese control in the Gulf of Khambhat.; Start of Mughal-Portuguese conflicts.
Portuguese conquest of Goa (1510)	Bijapur Sultanate	Kingdom of Portugal: Portuguese India	Portuguese victory: Consolidation of Portuguese India authority.
Siege of Aden (1513)	Portuguese Empire: Portuguese India	Yemeni Tahirids	Tahirid victory
Siege of Goa (1517)	Bijapur Sultanate	Portuguese Empire: Portuguese Goa	Portuguese victory
Battle of Zeila (1517)	Portuguese Empire: Portuguese India	Adal Sultanate	Portuguese victory
Sinhalese–Portuguese conflicts (1518–1658): Battle of Vedalai; Portuguese conquest of the Jaffna kingdom; Portuguese invasion of the Jaffna kingdom (1560); Portuguese invasion of the Jaffna kingdom (1591); Siege of Kotte (1557–1558); Battle of Mulleriyawa; Siege of Colombo (1587–88); Campaign of Danture; Battle of Balana; Kandyan commerce raiding against Portugal (1612–1613); Battle of Mulleriyawa (1624); Battle of Jaffna (1628); Battle of Randeniwela; Battle of Gannoruwa; Siege of Galle (1640); Action of 23 March 1654; Action of 2 May 1654	Kingdom of Sitawaka Kingdom of Kandy Principality of Raigama Kingdom of Jaffna Supported by: Zamorin of Calicut Kingdom of Tanjore Vanni chieftains Dutch East India Company (From 1638)	Portuguese Empire: Portuguese India; Portuguese Ceylon; Lascarins; Kingdom of Kotte	Stalemate: Establishment and then destruction of Portuguese Ceylon, after conquering kingdoms of Kotte, Sitawaka, Jaffna and Raigama.; Capture of Colombo, Galle, Jaffna, Raigama and much of Sitawaka by the Dutch and the establishment of Dutch Ceylon.
Lodi-Rajput War (1518–1519)	Kingdom of Mewar	Delhi Sultanate	Rajput victory: Northeast Rajputana annexed by Rana Sanga; Rana Sanga further defeated Ibrahim Lodi at Ranthambore after the Siege of Mandsaur.; Part of Rana Sanga's conquests.
Rajput invasion of Gujarat (1520)	Kingdom of Mewar	Gujarat Sultanate	Rajput victory: Royal treasuries of Gujarat plundered by Rana Sanga; Idar given to Rao Rai Mal Rathore; Part of Rana Sanga's conquests.
Battle of Raichur (20 May 1520)	Vijaynagar Empire	Sultanate of Bijapur	Vijaynagar victory: Part of Krishnadevaraya's conquests.
Babur's conquest of Delhi Sultanate (1526)	Delhi Sultanate	Emirate of Kabul	Mughal victory: Delhi Sultanate annexed by Mughals; Foundation of the Mughal Empire
Later Luso-Malabarese War (1526–1571)	Zamorin of Calicut	Portuguese Empire: Portuguese India	Zamorin victory
Babur-Rajput War (1526–1530)	Mughal Empire	Kingdom of Mewar	Mughal victory
Battle of Bayana (21 February 1527)	Rajput Confedracy	Mughal Empire: Afghans	Rajput victory: Mughal and Afghan Forces retreated; Bayana region captured by Rajput Forces; Part of Rana Sanga's conquests.; Starting of Mughal–Rajput Wars
Battle of Khanwa (16 March 1527)	Rajput Confederacy	Mughal Empire	Mughal victory: Mughal rule established in North India by Babur and Agra became centre of their power from Kabul.
Battle of Ghaghra (1529)	Mughal Empire	Sultanate of Bengal	Mughal victory: Bihar annexed by the Mughals
Battle of Kannauj (1540)	Mughal Empire	Sur Empire	Sur victory: Humayun was soundly defeated; Resulted in 15 year's exile in the court of Shah Tahmasp I
Battle of Sammel (1544)	Kingdom of Marwar	Sur Empire	Sur victory: Bikaner and Merta became independent from Marwar
Burmese–Siamese War (1547–1549)	Ayutthaya Kingdom (Siam) Supported by: Portuguese Empire: Portuguese India	Toungoo dynasty (Burma)	Siam Victory
Battle of Sirhind (1555)	Sur Empire	Mughal Empire	Mughal victory: Re-Establishment of Mughal Empire By Humayun
Second Battle of Panipat (1556)	Hemchandra Vikramaditya	Mughal Empire	Mughal victory: Mughal dynasty rule restored in North India; Hemchandra Vikramaditya Empire decline
Battle of Tughlaqabad (7 October 1556)	Hem Chandra Vikramaditya	Mughal Empire	Hem Chandra victory: Hem Chandra annexed mostly Mughals or Sur Empire's region and established a strong Hindu Empire; Part of 22 battles fought by Hemu
Battle of Talikota (23 January 1565)	Vijaynagar Empire	Deccan Sultanates	Deccan Sultanates victory: Vijayanagara was destroyed or looted by Muslim armies.; Penukonda became second capital of Vijaynagar Empire.
Siege of Chittorgarh (1567–1568) (23 October 1567 – 23 February 1568)	Kingdom of Mewar	Mughal Empire	Mughal victory: The Mughal Empire swept into the territories of Udai Singh II
Siege of Ranthambore (1568) (8 February 1568 – 21 March 1568)	Kingdom of Mewar	Mughal Empire	Mughal victory: Rajput leader Rai Surjan Hada surrenders Ranthambore Fort
War of the League of the Indies (1570 – 1574): Siege of Chaliyam	Sultanate of Bijapur Sultanate of Ahmadnagar Zamorin of Calicut (Aceh Sultanate) Sultanate of Aceh Co-belligerents: Princely states of the Kanara coast Kalinyamat Sultanate Sultanate of Ternate Sultanate of Tidore Sultanate of Golkonda Mappila Muslims	Portuguese Empire	Portuguese victory
Mughal invasion of Bengal (1572–1576)	Mughal Empire	Sultanate of Bengal	Mughal victory: Mughal annexation of Bengal and formation of Bengal Subah
Akbar-Rajput War (1576–1605)	Mughal Empire	Kingdom of Mewar	Mughal victory
Siege of Daman (1581): Part of Mughal-Portuguese conflicts	Mughal Empire	Portuguese Empire: Portuguese India	Portuguese victory
Battle of Leitao Coast (1586)	Portuguese Empire: Portuguese India	Arab Niquilus	Arab victory
Spanish-Portuguese conflict on China (1598–1600)	Portuguese Empire: Macau; Portuguese India	(Spain) Spanish Empire: (Spain) El Piñal; (Spain) Philippines	Portuguese victory
Siege of Kottakkal (1599–1600)	Portuguese Empire: Portuguese India; Kingdom of Calicut	Kunjali Marakkar forces	Portuguese and Calicut victory
Dutch–Portuguese War (1601–1661): Part of Eighty Years' War and Thirty Years' WarAsia; Battle of Bantam; Capture of Amboina; Battle of Changi (1603); Siege of Malacca (1606); Battle of Cape Rachado; Battle of Macau; Action of 1 February 1625; Battle off Hormuz (1625); Battle of Goa (1638); Action of 30 September 1639; Siege of Galle (1640); Siege of Malacca (1641); Action of 23 March 1654; Action of 2 May 1654; Dutch conquest of Malabar (1658-1663)	Kingdom of Portugal: (Portugal) Portuguese India; Brazilian colonial forces; (Portugal) Portuguese Angola; (Portugal) Portuguese Mozambique; (Portugal) Portuguese Malacca; (Portugal) Portuguese Ceylon; (Portugal) Portuguese Macau; Supported by: (Spain) Spanish Empire (until 1640); Kingdom of Cochin; Ming China; Hormuz; Potiguara Tupis	Dutch Republic: Dutch East Indies; Dutch West Indies; Dutch Brazil; Supported by: Kingdom of England (until 1640); France (until 1640); Safavid Empire; Johor Sultanate; Ternate; Ayutthaya; Kingdom of Kandy; Sitawaka; Jaffna; Kingdom of Kongo; Kingdom of Ndongo; Rio Grande Tupis Nhandui Tarairiu Tribe	Indecisive: Formation of the Dutch Empire.; Both sides claim victory in India.
Battle of Swally (1612)	Kingdom of Portugal: (Portugal) Portuguese India	English East India Company	British victory
Jahangir-Rajput War: Mughal expedition of Mewar; Battle of Dewair (1606–1615)	Kingdom of Mewar	Mughal Empire	Mughal victory: Amar Singh I Became Ally; Mewar became a allied state of Mughal Empire
Ahom–Mughal Wars (1615–1682)	Ahom kingdom	Mughal Empire	Ahom victory: Extension of Ahom influence to the Manas river
Battle of Toppur (1616–17)	Imperial forces of Vijaynagar Empire; Nayaks of Tanjore	Second faction of Vijayanagara Empire; Nayaks of Gingee; Nayaks of Madurai; Pandyas of Tirunelveli; Kingdom of Travancore; Portuguese	Imperial Vijayanagara forces victory: It was the battle which cause the complete disintegration of the Vijayanagar Empire, which was reviving slowly.
Madurai–Mysore Wars (1617–1694): Battle of Erode; Siege of Trichinopoly (1681); Mysore Invasions of Samballi; Battle of Madurai (1656); Maratha invasion of Srirangapatnam (1682)	Madurai Nayakas; Supported by: Vijayanagar Empire; Maratha Kingdom; Bijapur Sultanate; Thanjavur Maratha Kingdom; Nayakas of Ikkeri; Kingdom of Ramnad; Nayaks of Kalahasti	Kingdom of Mysore	Madurai Nayakas Victory: End of Mysore Expansion into Madurai Kingdom.
Battle of Rohila (1621)	Sikhs	Mughal Empire	Sikh victory
Mughal–Safavid war (1622–23) (1622–1623)	Mughal Empire	Safavid Empire	Safavid victory: Safavid annexation of Kandahar
Spanish-Siam War (1624–1636)	(Spain) Iberian Union: (Spain) Spanish East Indies; Council of Portugal; Macau; Goa; Malacca	Siam (Dutch Republic) Dutch East India Company	Siam victory: Dutch hegemony on Southeast Asia.
Grounding of the Jupiter (1625)	Mughal Empire	Danish India	Mughal victory
Grounding of the Nattergalen (1626)	Mughal Empire	Danish India	Mughal victory
Mombasa war (1631–32)	Portuguese Empire: Portuguese India	Mombasa Sultanate	Portuguese Victory: Portuguese retake Fort Jesus
Siege of Hooghly (1632): Part of Mughal-Portuguese conflicts	Mughal Empire	Portuguese Empire: Portuguese India	Mughal Victory
Battle of Amritsar (1634)	Sikhs	Mughal Empire	Sikh victory
Battle of Lahira (1634)	Sikhs	Mughal Empire	Sikh victory
Battle of Kartarpur (1635)	Sikhs	Mughal Empire	Sikh victory: Guru Hargobind led Sikh army defeated Mughals
Siege of Orchha (1635) (1635)	Bundela Rajputs	Mughal Empire	Mughal Victory: Aurangzeb captured Orchha; Jhujhar Singh escaped.
Battle of Phagwara (1635)	Sikhs	Mughal Empire	Sikh victory: Mughals repulsed
Battle of Kiratpur (1638)	Sikhs	Mughal Empire	Sikh victory
Siege of Daman (1638–1639)	Mughal Empire	Portuguese Empire: Portuguese India	Portuguese victory
Early Dano-Mughal Conflicts: Mirza Mumin's assault; Loss of the St. Jacob; (1640)	Mughal Empire	Denmark-Norway: (Denmark) Danish India	Mughal victory
Danish-Mughal War (1642–1698)	Mughal Empire	Denmark-Norway: (Denmark) Danish India	Stalemate
Mughal–Safavid war (1649–1653)	Mughal Empire	Safavid Empire	Persian victory: Safavid/Persian re-annexation of Kandahar
Dutch-Zamorin Conflicts (1666–1758)	Zamorin United Kingdom: (Kingdom of England) English East India Company; (Portugal) Portuguese Empire: Portuguese India	Dutch Republic: Dutch East India Company	Dutch victory
Rathore rebellion (1679–1707)	Kingdom of Marwar; Kingdom of Mewar	Mughal Empire	Inconclusive
Tibet-Ladakh-Mughal war of 1679-1684 (1679–1684)	Ladakh; Mughal Empire	Tibet; Zungar Empire	Mughal military victory: Mughal withdrawal after signing a treaty with the Ladakhis; Tibetan victory in another attack in 1684 with the assistance of reinforcements from the Zungar Empire; Treaty of Tingmosgang
Deccan Wars (1681–1707)	Maratha Empire	Mughal Empire	Inconclusive
Hill States–Sikh wars (1682 - 1815)	Sikhs	Hill States of India	Sikh victory
Maratha–Portuguese War (1683–1684)	Maratha Empire	Portuguese Empire: Portuguese India	Stalemate
Siege of Bijapur (1685–1686)	Bijapur Sultanate; Maratha Empire	Mughal Empire	Maratha victory
Anglo-Mughal War (1686–1690)	Mughal Empire	East India Company	Mughal victory: British conclusion of peace with the Mughal Emperor Aurangzeb in 1689
Siege of Golconda (1687)	Mughal Empire	Golconda Sultanate	Mughal victory: Mughal Empire annexes Golconda
Battle of Nadaun (1691)	Bilaspur State Akal Sena (Sikhs)	Mughal Empire Kangra State Bijarwal State	Sikh victory
Mughal–Portuguese War (1692–1693): Part of Mughal-Portuguese conflicts	Mughal Empire	Portuguese Empire: Portuguese India	Status quo ante bellum
Omani–Portuguese conflict (1696–1714): Siege of Mombasa (1696–1698); Battle of Surat (1704)	Portuguese Empire: Portuguese India; (Portugal) Portuguese Mombasa	Omani Empire	Indecisive: Omani forces capture Fort Jesus.; End of Portuguese hegemony in Southeast Africa.
Battle of Guler (1696)	Sikhs	Mughal Empire	Sikh victory
Rajput Rebellion 1708-1710 (1708–1710)	Kingdom of Marwar; Kingdom of Mewar; Kingdom of Amber	Mughal Empire	Rajput victory: Mughal emperor sued for peace; Restoration of the Rajput holdings which had been annexed by the previous Mughal Emperor Aurangzeb.
Battle of Gurdas Nangal (1715)	First Sikh State	Mughal Empire	Mughal victory
Siege of Gurdaspur (1715)	First Sikh State	Mughal Empire	Mughal victory: Banda Singh Bahadur and his soldiers captured and later executed
Maratha–Portuguese War (1725–1726)	Maratha Confederacy	Portuguese Empire: Portuguese India	Inconclusive: Peace of Bassein
Maratha–Portuguese War (1729–1732)	Maratha Confederacy	Portuguese Empire: Portuguese India; Supported by: British Empire; British East India Company	Status quo ante bellum: Start of Novas Conquistas
Novas Conquistas (1729–1789): Siege of Alorna; Siege of Tiracol	Kingdom of Mysore Maratha Empire: Kolhapur State; Sawantwadi State	(Portugal) Portuguese Empire: Portuguese India; Supported by: Rajahnate of Soonda Kingdom of Sawantwadi	Portuguese Victory
Nadir Shah's invasion of India (1738–1739)	Mughal Empire	Afsharid dynasty	Persian victory: Persian occupation and plundering of Delhi
Travancore–Dutch War (incl. Battle of Colachel (Kulachal) 10 August 1741 (1739–1753)	Travancore	(Dutch Republic) Dutch Empire: Dutch East India Company	Travancore victory: Dutch colonization halted in Travancore
Battle of Vasai (1739)	Maratha Empire	Portuguese Empire: Portuguese India	Maratha victory: Baçaim ceded to the Peshwas
Battle of Karnal (1739–February 13, 1739)	Mughal Empire	Persian Afsharid Empire	Persian victory
Siege of Trichinopoly (1741) (1741)	Maratha Empire	Mughal Empire: Nawab of the Carnatic	Maratha victory: Maratha annexation of Tiruchirappalli
Expeditions in Bengal (1741–1748)	Maratha Empire	Mughal Empire: Nawab of Bengal	Peace treaty: Maratha annexation of the territory up to the river Suvarnarekha from Bengal
First Carnatic War (1744–1748): Part of War of the Austrian Succession	Mughal Empire Nizam of Hyderabad: Nawab of Carnatic	Kingdom of France: (Kingdom of France) French East India Company; Kingdom of Great Britain: British East India Company	Status quo ante bellum
Second Carnatic War (1749–1754)	Kingdom of France: (Kingdom of France) French East India Company; Mughal Empire Kingdom of Mysore Nawab of Arcot (Chanda Sahib) Hyderabad State (Muzaffar Jang Hidayat)	Kingdom of Great Britain: British East India Company; Maratha Empire Nawab of Arcot (Wallajah) Hyderabad State (Nasir Jung)	Stalemate: Treaty of Pondicherry
Naval Battle of Calicut (1752)	Maratha Empire	Portuguese Empire: Portuguese India	Maratha victory
Seven Years' War (1754–1763): Third Carnatic War	France Austria (Russian Empire) Russia (until 1762) (Spain) Spanish Empire (from 1761); Sweden (1757–62); Saxony; Mughal Empire (from 1757)	Prussia Great Britain (Province of Hanover) Hanover; Brunswick-Wolfenbüttel; Iroquois Confederacy; Portugal (from 1761); Hesse-Kassel; Schaumburg-Lippe	Status quo ante in Europe, but transfer of colonial possessions between Britain, France and Spain in the Treaty of Paris (1763).: French cession of New France (excluding Louisiana) to Britain and recognition of British supremacy in Bengal; Spanish cession of Florida to Britain; French cession of Louisiana to Spain; British cession of Cuba and Manila (Philippine Islands) to Spain; Britain restored the Indian factories to France, but forbade French traders from administering them; France recognized British clients as the rulers of key Indian native states and pledged not to send troops to Bengal.
Maratha conquest of North-west India (1757–1758)	Maratha Empire	Durrani Empire	Peace treaty: Maratha annexation of Punjab, Kashmir and surrounding regions.
Battle of Plassey (1757)	East India Company	Nawab of Bengal; French East India Company	Company victory: British annexation of Bengal
Afghan-Maratha War (1758–1761)	Maratha Empire; Sikh confederacy	Durrani Empire; Rohilkhand	Durrani victory
Third Battle of Panipat (1761)	Maratha Empire	Durrani Empire	Durrani victory: Sadashiv Bahu led Maratha forces defeated by Ahmad shah abdali
Battle of Kup (1762)	Durrani Empire	Sikh Confederacy	Durrani victory: Ahmad Shah's forces killed several thousand Sikhs, and the surviving Sikhs fled to Barnala. According to various different estimates, as many as 5,000 to 30,000 Sikh men, women, elderly and children were killed in what is known as the second Sikh genocide (Vadda Ghalughara).
Battle of Sirhind (1764)	Sikh Confederacy	Durrani Empire	Sikh victory: Sikhs capture Sirhind.
Battle of Buxar (1764)	East India Company	Mughal Empire	Company victory: Treaty of Allahabad
First Anglo-Mysore War (1767–1769)	East India Company; Maratha Empire; Nawab of the Carnatic; Hyderabad	Mysore	Mysore victory: Treaty of Madras
First Anglo-Maratha War (1775–1782)	Maratha Empire	East India Company	Maratha victory: Treaty of Salbai
Battle of Delhi (1783)	Sikh Confederacy	Mughal Empire	Sikh victory: Construction of Gurudwara Bangla Sahib, Gurudwara Sis Ganj Sahib
Second Anglo-Mysore War (1780–1784)	Mysore	East India Company; Maratha Empire	Status quo ante bellum: Treaty of Mangalore
Maratha-Mysore War (1785–1787)	Maratha Empire	Mysore	Maratha victory: Treaty of Gajendragad
Third Anglo-Mysore War (1789–1792)	East India Company; Maratha Empire; Hyderabad; Travancore	Mysore Diplomatic support: France	Maratha-Hyderabad-British victory: Treaty of Seringapatam
Fourth Anglo-Mysore War (1798–1799)	East India Company; Maratha Empire; Hyderabad; Travancore	Mysore Diplomatic support: France	Maratha-Hyderabad-British victory
Second Anglo-Maratha War (1803–1805)	Maratha Empire	East India Company	British victory: Treaty of Surji-Anjangaon
Battle of Vizagapatam (1804)	East India Company; United Kingdom	France	French victory
Anglo-Nepalese War (1814–1816)	East India Company; Garhwal Kingdom; Patiala State; Kingdom of Sikkim	Nepal	Company victory: Treaty of Sugauli; Cession of Nepalese territory to the British Empire
Capture of East India Company ship Nautilus (1815)	East India Company	United States	American victory: Capture of Nautilus by American forces
Third Anglo-Maratha War (1817–1818)	Maratha Empire	East India Company	British victory: Formal dissolution of the Maratha Empire
First Anglo-Burmese War (1824–1826)	East India Company	Burmese Empire	Company victory: Treaty of Yandabo; Beginning of British rule in Burma
Siege of Herat (1837–1838): Part of Great Game	Emirate of Herat East India Company Supported by: British Empire Aimaq tribesmen Maimana Khanate Andkhui Khanate Sheberghan Khanate Sar-i Pul Khanate Bukhara Emirate Khiva Khanate	Qajar Iran Supported by: Russian Empire Principality of Qandahar	Company victory: Temporary British occupation of Kharg Island. Persian withdrawal from Herat.
First Anglo-Afghan War (1839–1842)	East India Company	Emirate of Afghanistan	Afghan victory: British withdrawal from Afghanistan
First Opium War (1839–1842)	Great Britain: East India Company	Qing dynasty	Company victory: Treaty of Nanking
First Anglo-Sikh War (1845–1846)	Sikh Empire	East India Company; Patiala	Company victory
Second Anglo-Sikh War (1848–1849)	Sikh Empire	East India Company	Company victory: Dissolution of the Sikh Empire
Second Anglo-Burmese War (1852)	East India Company	Burmese Empire	Company victory: Succession of Pagan Min by Mindon Min in Burma
Anglo-Persian War (1856–1857)	United Kingdom: East India Company; Afghanistan	Iran	Company victory: Treaty of Paris (1857); Persian withdrawal from Herat
Indian Rebellion of 1857 (1857–1858)	Mughal Empire; Oudh; Forces of Rani Lakshmibai of Jhansi; Forces of Nana Sahib Peshwa II; Various other Rajas, Nawabs, Zamindars, Taluqdars, and chieftains	East India Company; United Kingdom; Nepal; Various other Rajas, Nawabs, Zamindars, Taluqdars, and chieftains	Company victory: Suppression of the rebellions; End of the Mughal Empire and Company rule in India; Establishment of Crown rule in India (British Raj)
