= Battle of Trichinopoly (1682) =

1682 battle

- Part of Maratha-Mysore War (1682)
Date	Late 1682
Location	Tiruchirapalli, Tamil Nadu
Result	Maratha victory
Territorial changes	Marathas capture the city and fort of Tiruchirapalli

Belligerents
Maratha Kingdom; Thanjavur Maratha kingdom Golkonda Sultanate; Keladi Kingdom	Kingdom of Mysore; Madurai Nayaks

Commanders and leaders
Sambhaji; Abul Hasan Qutb Shah; Kavi Kalash; Harji Mahadik; Ekoji; Basappa Nayaka; Pehshan Ali	Chikka Devaraja; Chokkanatha Nayak †

Strength
25,000	~20,000

Casualties and losses
Unknown	Unknown

Battle of Trichinopoly (1682) was fought between the Maratha Empire and the Kingdom of Mysore. The Maratha forces under Sambhaji and his allies, besieged and captured the city of Tiruchirappalli.

== Background ==
Shahaji had conquered territories in the states of Karnataka. Mohammed Adil Shah, Sultan of Bijapur granted him the Jagir of Bangalore. This was the entry of the Marathas in the Southern India.

The Maratha Empire and the Kingdom of Mysore had rivalry in South India. Chikkadevaraya, the king of Mysore had challenged the Marathas in the South. Several battles were fought between them. Both sides won and lost some battles. As a result, Sambhaji and his allies invaded Mysore in June 1682. Chikkadevaraya soundly defeated them at the Battle of Banavar. Sambhaji and his forces retreated near Thanjavur.

== Tactics and plans ==
Sambhaji rested near Thanjavur for 20 days. He received more reinforcements from Hukkeri and Golconda. His uncle Ekoji I also joined forces with him.

Sambhaji had realised the strength of Mysore forces near their heartland. He decided to draw them away from their stronghold to flat plains near Madurai. He decided to attack and besiege the city of Tiruchirapalli.

The weakened Nayaka of Madurai, Chokkanatha Nayak lived on the fort. He was a vassal of the Kingdom of Mysore. Still, the city had strong defences and a formidable Mysore garrison in the city and on the fort.

Sambhaji wanted to negate the superiority of Mysore archers. During their rest time Sambhaji ordered all the cobblers from neighbouring villages and made leather arrow-proof jackets for his entire army. These leather jackets were coated with a layer of oil to avoid arrows from getting stuck in the jackets. Sambhaji also collected the abundantly available war elephants from the surrounding region. He ordered all the boatmen from the nearby villages to assemble with his army. 300 archers of the Maratha army were prepared to fire lit arrows during the attack.

== Battle ==
Tiruchirapalli lied on the opposite bank of the Kaveri river. At the dawn, the Maratha forces crossed the river using the boats collected from nearby villages. The sudden attack of the Marathas surprised the Mysore defenders, they started showering arrows on the Maratha Army. The Maratha leather jackets provided effective protection and negated arrows from the Mysore bowmen. Elephants broke through the main doors in the meanwhile and fierce battle ensued on the streets of Tiruchirappalli. Marathas captured the city by the evening but the Tiruchirapalli Rock Fort was still controlled by the Mysore army.

Meanwhile, Chokkanatha Nayak died on the fort. Sambhaji with a force of 10,000 laid siege to the fort after 10 days. The Marathas again adopted similar tactics to negate Mysore archers. The Maratha archers accurately struck lit arrows on the ammunitions depot within the fort resulting in a huge explosion, and collapse of the wall. The Marathas soon entered and captured the fort. The Marathas sacked Tiruchirapalli.

Historian Sadashiv Shivde has mentioned that, this victory was a success point of Sambhaji's military intelligence.

== Aftermath ==
The defeat at Tiruchirapalli dealt a severe blow to Chikka Deva as several of his allies joined Sambhaji. Sambhaji then captured several provinces, including Dharmapuri and the region in northern Madurai. Chikka Deva entered negotiations with Sambhaji and brought an end to the war by paying the tribute. A treaty was signed at Srirangapatna in which he paid 1 Crore Honas as a war tribute to Sambhaji. However this was a temporary surrender and the conflicts continued in the following years.
