= Siege of Trichinopoly (1681) =

1682 siege in Deccan

- Part of Madurai-Mysore Wars and Maratha-Mysore Wars
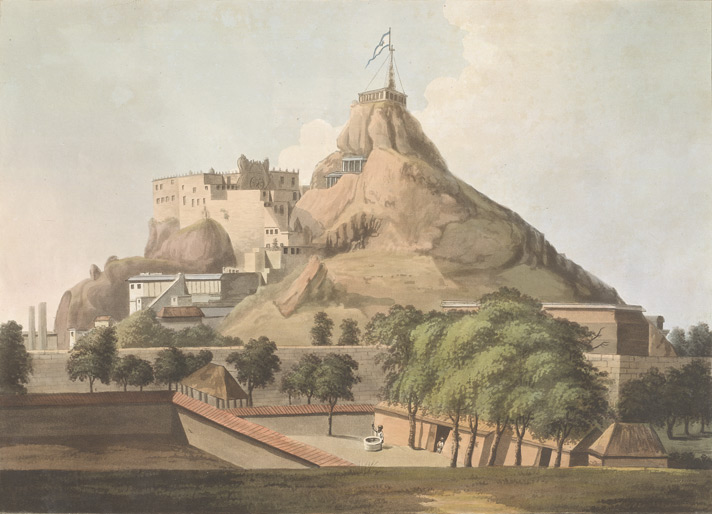
- Southeast view of the rock of Trichinopoly
Date	1682
Location	Trichinopoly, India
Result	Allied victory

Belligerents
Madurai Nayakas; Maratha Kingdom; Thanjavur Maratha Kingdom; Kingdom of Ramnad	Kingdom of Mysore

Commanders and leaders
Chokkanatha Nayak; Harji Mahadik; Ekoji I Raghunatha Kilavan	Kumaraiya (POW)

Casualties and losses
	2,000 horses captured

The Siege of Trichinopoly in 1682 was a siege launched by Chikka Devaraja of Mysore, who sent his general Kumaraiya to capture the fort. At first, Mysore gained hope after Rustam Khan of Madurai was defeated and killed. But Chokkanatha Nayak soon received help from Harji Mahadik of Gingee the general of Sambhaji, Ekoji I of Tanjore, and the Maravas of Ramnad. Kumaraiya’s plans failed when his secret letters for reinforcements fell into enemy hands. Though Mysore scored a victory at Srirangapatna under Doddaiya, Kumaraiya was captured at Trichinopoly after a bloody battle the siege ended in Mysore’s defeat.

== Background ==
=== Importance of Trichinopoly ===
Towards the end of 1681, Chikka Devaraja of Mysore set his eyes on Trichinopoly, a city of great importance in South India. Many powers were interested in this place. The Nayaks of Madurai were always careful to guard Trichinopoly against outside attacks. At the same time, Harji Mahadik had secured control over Gingee and was actively involved in southern politics. Mysore, having failed in its plans at Ikkeri, now looked toward Trichinopoly for expansion. Meanwhile, Ekoji I, the Maratha ruler of Tanjore, had already started his campaigns and was ready to join whichever side would help him gain more land.

=== The object of the expedition to Trichinopoly ===
Chikka Devaraja started his expedition to Trichinopoly with a clear aim. He had earlier suffered losses in the Bednore kingdom, which weakened his power and ambitions. To make up for this loss, he turned his attention toward the Madurai kingdom. By capturing Trichinopoly, which was an important stronghold of Nayaks of Madurai, he hoped to expand his influence and recover the power and territory he had lost in Bednore.

Wilk Say's:

"Thus relieved from the hostility on the west his increasing power and resources encouraged him to turn again his attention to the south east and to plan the conquest of the dominions of the Nayak of Madura."

== Siege ==
=== Kumaraiya defeats Madurai army ===
Chikka Devaraja sent his general, Kumaraiya, with a large army to attack Trichinopoly. After quick marches, the Mysore army surrounded the fort, turning it into a battlefield for many rival powers. This caused great worry for Madurai. At that time, real power in Madurai was in the hands of Rustam Khan, a usurper commander, while Chokkanatha Nayak remained king only in name. Rustam Khan was troubled by the growing danger at Trichinopoly. With his cavalry, he tried to attack the Mysore camp, but his forces were defeated and driven back. He then hurried to the capital, where he was killed. According to a Jesuit letter, his weak leadership in defending Trichinopoly led to a plot against him, which ended his life.

The Jesuit letter of 1682 says:

"Kumara Raya (Dalavai Kumaraiya) the Mysore general attacked Trichinorpoly with a strong army; the commander of the place (Rustam Khan), enticed by the enemy made an imprudent sally, fell into an ambuseade and lost nearly all his cavalry in it when he returned to the citadel, Sokkalinga helped by his devoted friends, fell on him and massacred him with the Mohammedeans who accompanied him".

=== The formation of a confederacy ===
After Rustam Khan’s defeat and murder, General Kumaraiya of Mysore felt confident that he could easily capture Trichinopoly, as the city seemed weak and without proper defence. He hoped to fulfill his ambitions without facing much resistance. However, his plans were soon ruined when Confederacy forces arrived to support Chokkanatha Nayak of Madurai. Harji Mahadik from Gingee and Ekoji I of Tanjore, along with the Maravas of Ramnad, formed a strong alliance against the Mysore army.

The Jesuit letter of 1682 says:

Delivered from the domestic enemy, the Nayak found himself surrounded by four large armies, the first was that of Kumara Raya when besieged him; the second that of the Maravas, who came on the pretext of defending their sovereign but whose object was to get their share of pillage; the third was that of Arasumalai, general of Sambogi; the fourth that of Ekoji. The two latter pretended to help the Nayak who had called them; tut their real motive vas to repulse the army of Mysore "whose proximity they feared".

Harji Mahadik had clear reasons to support Chokkanatha Nayak against Mysore. Soon after becoming Governor of Gingee in March 1681, he, along with Dadaji and Jaitaji, began seizing lands that belonged to Mysore and Madurai. Before the siege of Trichinopoly, Harji and his companions had attacked the fort of Dharmapuri in Salem district and held it under siege for eight months. But when the Mysore army arrived quickly, they defeated the Marathas with force, causing them to flee in fear and take shelter at Samyaminipattanam in southern Dharmapuri. From that time, Harji developed a lasting hostility towards Mysore. Wherever Mysore clashed with its neighbors, Harji would step in, always taking the chance to strike at Mysore by supporting its enemies with full loyalty.

As soon as Chokkanatha Nayak asked Harji Mahadik for help against Mysore, Harji quickly answered the call and marched with his army to Trichinopoly. Not long after, Ekoji I also came forward in the same spirit, bringing his forces to join the cause. In this way, the Maratha leaders set aside their differences and stood together with Chokkanatha. Before the walls of Trichinopoly.

=== Kumaraiya sued for peace ===
Kumaraiya was shocked to see the sudden and unlikely alliance of the Marathas joining hands with Chokkanatha Nayak. Realizing that his own army was too small and weak to face such a powerful force, he understood that fighting would be useless. With little hope of winning by strength, he turned to diplomacy instead, hoping that careful negotiation might save him from the grave danger now threatening his position at Trichinopoly.

The Jesuit letter says:

"Kumara Raya, realizing that it was impossible for him to resist such armies with troops so inferior in number, offered peace to the Nayak promising tb preserve his kingdom for him and reestablish the successors of the ancient Nayaks of Tanjore and Gingee".

Kumaraiya promised to restore the rule of the Nayaks in Gingee and Tanjore by driving out the Marathas and also assured that the lands of Madurai would be left safe and untouched. But Chokkanatha Nayak was not ready to believe him. Known for his deep suspicion in all matters, whether good or bad, he doubted Kumaraiya’s words. His mistrustful mind made him see even these promises as tricks, and he refused to accept the Mysore general’s offer in good faith.

=== Chokkanatha the idle spectator ===
If Chokkanatha Nayak had truly cared for the freedom of his kingdom, he should have joined hands with Kumaraiya, who had willingly offered friendly support. Together, they could have formed a strong front to drive out the Marathas. Unfortunately, he failed to act at the right moment. Instead of showing skill, effort, and leadership, Chokkanatha Nayak chose to remain passive, watching events as a mere spectator. His weakness gave bold men like Harji Mahadik the chance to grow stronger, and Harji took full advantage by seizing as much land in the South as he could.

The Jesuit letter of 1682 says:

"Undoubtedly the wisest course would have been to make a league with the king of My sore to chase the Marathas".

=== Kumaraiya opened negotiations with Harji ===
With Chokkanatha Nayak showing no spirit to act, it was impossible for him to escape the trouble surrounding him and his followers. In this tense situation, Kumaraiya turned to diplomacy once again. He opened talks with Harji Mahadik, the Maratha general under Sambhaji, offering a large sum of money if Harji would return to Gingee without harming the Mysore army. His true aim, however, was to buy time until Chikka Devaraja could send reinforcements. But misfortune struck when the letters he sent for help fell into enemy hands.

=== Maratha invasion of Srirangapatnam 1682 ===
Harji Mahadik, more alert and farsighted than Kumaraiya, quickly grasped the weakness of Mysore planned to capture Srirangapatna itself. He knew the Mysore army was tied down at Trichinopoly, leaving the capital almost undefended. Without loosening his grip on Kumaraiya, he sent Dadaji Kakade, Jaitaji Katkar, Nimbalkar, and others at the head of a strong cavalry force with clear orders to march on Srirangapatna. At that time, Ekoji I had placed his commanders in different parts of Karnataka Jasavanta Rao at Hosur, while Harji, Jaitaji, and Dadaji were at Dharmapuri. The court poet Tirumalya in his famous work Apratima Vira Charitra also records this arrangement. Confident in their strength, the Maratha generals advanced with forced marches, boasting that none could match them in battle.

The Maratha commanders made a sudden dash into Mysore territory and set up camp near Kothathi and Kushagaree, close to Srirangapatna. Their swift move threw the whole region into panic and disorder. Chikka Devaraja was shocked when he heard that enemy forces were stationed so near his capital. Without delay, he sent urgent orders to his general at Trichinopoly to dispatch a large part of the army back through the Kaveripuram Ghat under Doddaiya and other leaders, so that the kingdom could be saved from the impending danger.

Kumaraiya could not lead the army back because he had vowed not to face the Raja until Trichinopoly was won. Therefore, the command was given to Doddaiya, who was ordered to move as quickly as possible to defend the kingdom. Obeying these instructions, Doddaiya marched day and night through the Kaveripuram Ghat with great speed. His efforts paid off, as he reached Srirangapatna just in time to protect the capital from the advancing Marathas.

Following Chikka Devaraja’s orders Doddaiya launched a surprise night attack on the Maratha camps. To frighten the enemy, he cleverly tied burning torches to the horns of oxen and drove them toward the Marathas from all directions. The sudden blaze and confusion terrified the Marathas, who thought they were being attacked by a massive force. Panic spread quickly, and they began to flee in disorder. In the fierce fighting that followed, the Marathas suffered heavy losses and were completely defeated.

In the night attack, nearly two to three thousand oxen with flaming torches tied to their horns were driven into the Maratha camp, throwing their ranks into confusion. The Mysore army won a decisive victory, gaining rich spoils from the battlefield. Three leading Maratha commanders were captured and executed, while many of their men were slain. The Mysore army also seized all the enemy’s weapons, baggage, and supplies. The next day, Doddaiya and his soldiers marched into the royal Durbar in full military style, carrying the bloodstained heads of the Maratha leaders as proof of their triumph. Chikka Devaraja ordered the heads to be displayed on the fort walls of Srirangapatna. The shattered Maratha survivors managed to slip back to their capital, where they reported the disaster in detail to their ruler.

Apratima Vira Charita explains vividly the defeat of the Maratha generals by Chikkadevaraja:

"as Chikkadevaraja had exterminated Jaitaji, dadaji and other reputed Maratha generals, he came to be respected as the complete incarnation of Narayana on earth".

=== Result ===
The defeat of the Marathas was a great victory for Chikka Devaraja bringing him fame and honor as a powerful ruler across the region. His court poets praised his bravery in glowing verses, celebrating the triumph as a mark of his strength and chivalry. Doddaiya’s action in killing the Maratha generals and forcing the rest of their army to flee in fear, never daring to return to Mysore, proved highly successful. In an open Durbar, Chikka Devaraja welcomed his general with warmth, showed him deep respect, and rewarded him generously for his courage and loyalty.

The news of Mysore’s victory spread quickly, reaching not only the Marathas in the south and north but also the Mughal Emperor, who was watching the affairs of the South with keen interest. Aurangzeb was pleased to hear of the defeat, as it weakened Sambhaji who had only recently begun his campaigns. This blow struck hard at the Maratha power, but it also created deeper hostility between Mysore and Marathas. The defeat widened the gap between the two kingdoms and pushed the Maratha leaders to plan harsher and more desperate measures of revenge against Mysore.

=== Defeat of Kumaraiya at Trichinopoly ===
Harji Mahadik was confident that the Maratha Army under Dadaji, Jaitaji, and Nimbalkar would succeed in capturing Srirangapatna. But when the defeated survivors returned with the news of their loss, all of Harji’s high hopes collapsed. Angered by this setback, he turned to harsher and more ruthless measures against Kumaraiya, who was trapped at Trichinopoly without any reinforcements from Mysore. Realizing his desperate situation, Kumaraiya secretly planned to escape back to Mysore without being noticed by the Marathas. However, his attempt failed completely.

The Jesuit letter of 1682 says:

Receiving neither reinforcements nor reply to his letters, Kumara Raya was obliged to seek safety in honourable retreat. He ordered the cavalry corps to feign a movement to attract the attention of the enemies, to engage them as long as possible and then flee with full speed towards Mysore while he himself would take advantage of this diversion to escape, with his infantry, in an opposite direction and thus save his army. But the Mahrathas would not allow themselves to be put on the wrong scent for a long time past their self-conceit and audacity had been increasing by the inaction of Kumara Raya which revealed to them his weakness and their strength they kept close to his army and none of his actions could escape then".

According to Kumaraiya’s orders, the Mysore army pretended to move away, but the Marathas stayed alert and struck with full force. Their sudden attack threw the Mysore troops into confusion, and a fierce, bloody battle followed, with countless men mercilessly slain. Many Mysore soldiers were taken prisoner, including Kumaraiya himself. The Marathas also seized immense wealth from the camp, satisfying Harji Mahadik’s desire for revenge after the defeat his forces had suffered earlier at Srirangapatna. The Jedhe Sakavali even records that the Marathas captured 200 horses and a commander named Kumar from the Mysore army during this defeat.

The Jesuit letter of 1682 says:

"Then they (Marathas) fell on the infantry, and the combat was only a horrible butchery they found rich booty, the result of several years' pillage and made large number of prisoners among whom was Kumara Raya himself. The defeat and capture of this general, till then invincible, completed the joy and pride of arasumalai".

Historian Sarkar, using a Persian source, notes that in March 1683 Harji Mahadik marched with his army to assist the Nayak of Trichinopoly against an attack from the chief of Seringapatam. In this campaign, the Mysore general was captured along with about 2,000 horses.

== Aftermath ==
Once the Mysore general was defeated, it became much easier to deal with the scattered remnants of his army. Using this great victory to his advantage, Harji Mahadik quickly drove out the Mysore forces, not only from Trichinopoly but also from the other strongholds they had captured from the Nayaks of Madurai. In this way, he firmly restored control and strengthened his position in the region.

== See also ==
- Maratha-Mysore War (1682)
- Sambhaji
- Mughal Empire
