= Maratha invasion of Srirangapatnam (1682) =

1682 conflict part of Maratha–Mysore War

Maratha Invasion of Srirangapatnam
- Part of Madurai-Mysore Wars and Maratha-Mysore War (1682)
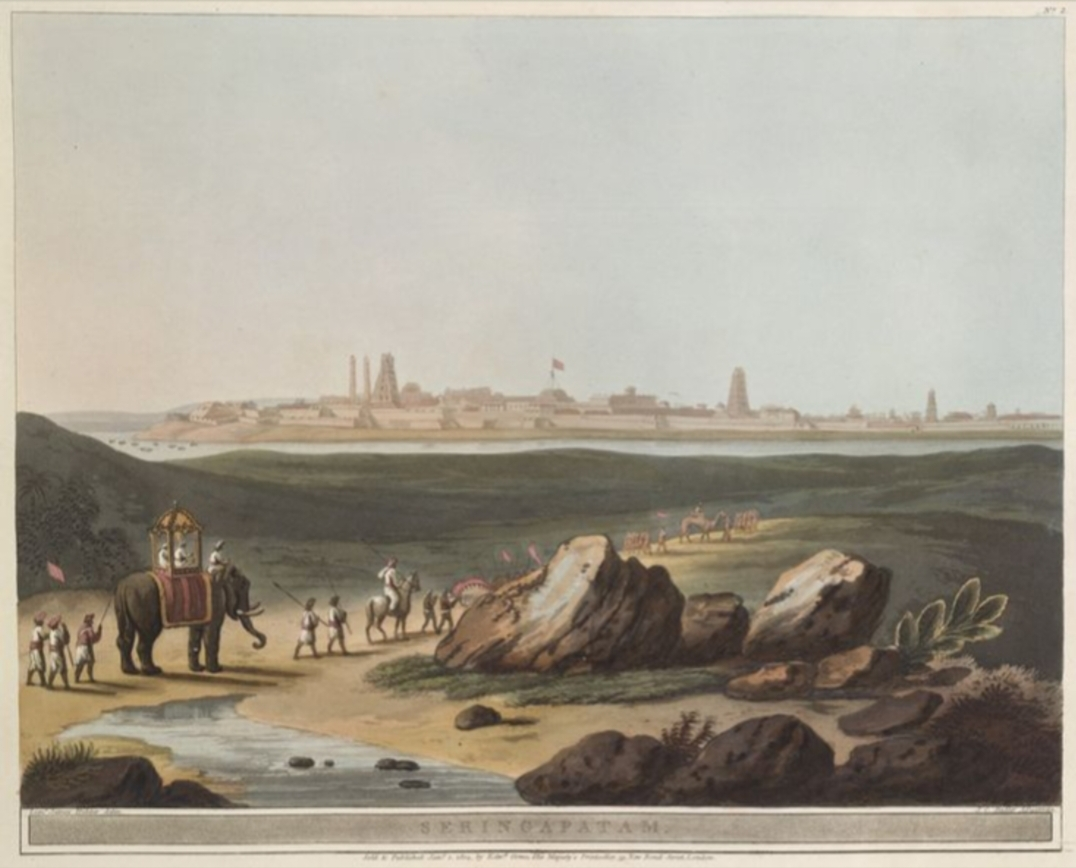
- 18th view of Seringapatam Fort
Date	April, 1682
Location	Srirangapatnam, India
Result	Mysore victory

Belligerents
Maratha Kingdom	Kingdom of Mysore

Commanders and leaders
Jaitaji Kakade (executed); Dadaji (executed); Nimbalji (executed)	Doddaiya

The Maratha invasion of Srirangapatnam (1682) was a major invasion during Chikka Devaraja Wodeyar’s rule. When most of the Mysore army was away fighting at Tiruchirapalli, the Marathas, under Haraji Mahadik, sent their generals Dadaji, Jaitaji, and Nimbaji to capture the Mysore capital. They marched quickly and camped near Mandya, creating fear and confusion. Chikka Devaraja immediately sent his general Doddaiya with fresh forces to protect the city. In a daring night attack, Doddaiya used a clever tactic tying flaming torches to oxen and driving them into the Maratha camp. The sudden sight terrified the Maratha soldiers, and Mysore’s army followed with a fierce assault. The Marathas were completely defeated, their generals were killed.

== Background ==
The weak rule of Chokkanatha Nayak of Madurai gave Mysore a chance to expand its power. From 1678, his authority had declined, and Rustum Khan, his commander, took control and ruled like an independent prince. The royal family was kept under strict watch, and Chokkanatha felt trapped. Seeking relief, he appealed to both Mysore and the Marathas for help. Chikka Devaraja of Mysore seized this opportunity and sent his general, Kumaraiya, officially to aid Chokkanatha Nayak, but in reality to capture Tiruchirapalli.

Kumaraiya marched swiftly, defeated Rustum Khan, and freed Chokkanatha Nayak, who expressed his gratitude and even wrote to the Governor of Madras about his new friendship with Mysore. But Chokkanatha failed to see the true aim of Mysore. Chikka Devaraja’s real intention was not to help him but to secure Tiruchirapalli. Soon, Kumaraiya embarrassed Chokkanatha by demanding the fort as a reward for his help. According to Wilks, Kumaraiya had even vowed not to face his king again until he had taken Tiruchirapalli.

This demand angered Chokkanatha Nayak, who then turned to the Marathas for support. The Marathas eagerly joined him, pretending to help against Kumaraiya, but in truth, they wanted to block Mysore’s ambitions. If Mysore gained Tiruchirapalli, it would create constant conflict with the Marathas, since the fort lay close to their settlements at Gingee and Tanjore. Thus, Tiruchirapalli became a bone of contention between Mysore and the Marathas.

Kumaraiya could not face this strong alliance of the Marathas, Chokkanatha Nayak, and the Maravas. He tried secretly to break the confederacy. First, he offered peace to Chokkanatha, promising to protect his kingdom and restore the Nayaks of Tanjore and Gingee, but Chokkanatha Nayak refused. Then he tried to win over Haraji by offering him large sums of money, mainly to buy time until reinforcements arrived from Mysore.

The letters sent by asking for help were intercepted by the enemy, who deliberately withheld them to weaken him further. The Marathas now understood his plans, and Harji Mahadik took advantage of the crisis. Seeing Mysore’s army tied down at Tiruchirapalli and Srirangapatna left vulnerable, he sent a strong force under his generals Dadaji Kakade, Jaitaji, and Nimbaji with orders to strike directly at the Mysore capital.

== Invasion ==
Chikka Devaraja’s position soon became dangerous because most of his army was stuck at Tiruchirapalli, leaving Srirangapatna exposed to the Maratha threat. To save the capital, he quickly sent orders to Dalavoy Kumaraiya, asking him to dispatch troops for its defense. In response, Kumaraiya sent a strong force under his nephew, General Doddaiya. The Mysore army moved swiftly through the Kaveripuram passes and advanced towards the Maratha camp.

The palace records describe the battle in vivid detail. Doddaiya launched a surprise night attack with clever tactics. He tied burning torches to the horns of oxen and let them loose from different directions into the Maratha camp. The sudden sight of rushing animals with fire startled the Marathas and threw their camp into complete confusion. Seizing the moment, the Mysore army charged in, turning the surprise into a bloody battle.

The clash ended with heavy losses for the Marathas. Their leading generals Dadaji, Jaitaji, and Nimbaji were captured and killed on the battlefield. Their severed heads were displayed on the gates of Srirangapatnam as a mark of Mysore’s triumph. This victory not only saved the capital but also deeply impressed contemporaries.

Aurangzeb himself was said to have praised Chikka Devaraja for this heroic feat, delighted at the death of the Maratha generals. Dalavoy Vira Rajaiya recorded that the victory made Chikka Devaraja evaraja the master of Karnataka. Kashipati Pandita, writing in the eighteenth century, observed that by defeating the Marathas Chikka Devaraja firmly established Mysore’s claim to supremacy in the region.

== Aftermath ==
The defeat of the Maratha army at Mandya created serious problems for Kumaraiya at Tiruchirapalli. The death of Dadaji and other leaders was a heavy blow to Haraji, who felt deeply humiliated and became determined to take revenge. Kumaraiya’s position in Tiruchirapalli grew more dangerous with each passing day. He received neither reinforcements nor replies to his desperate letters, which forced him to think of escaping quietly to Mysore. He waited for an opportunity to withdraw with his men unnoticed, but the Marathas, who had grown more confident due to his inaction, kept a close watch on him.

Finding him weak and without sufficient soldiers, the Marathas launched a sudden and fierce attack. The Mysore army was overwhelmed, and heavy losses were suffered. Many officers were taken prisoner, and Kumaraiya himself was captured. This defeat was a crushing blow, for until then Kumaraiya had been regarded as an almost invincible general.

Haraji celebrated the victory with pride, and the capture of Kumaraiya greatly increased his reputation. Taking advantage of this success, he drove the Mysoreans out of the forts and strongholds they had earlier seized from the Nayaks of Madurai, restoring Maratha influence in the region.

== See also ==
- Maratha-Mysore War (1682)
- Chokkanatha Nayak
- Sambhaji
