= Amritamma =

- Queen Mother of the Wodeyar Dynasty
- Born: Muguru, Kingdom of Mysore
- Died: 17th-century, Mysore, Kingdom of Mysore
- Spouse: Dodda Devaraja
- Issue: Chikka Devaraja
- House: Mugur (by birth) Wodeyar (by marriage)
- Father: Bale Urs

Maharani Amritamma, also known as Amrit Ammani or Amritamba, was the Maharani of the Wadiyar Dynasty and was the consort of Dodda Devaraja, the brother of Dodda Kempedevaraja. She was the queen mother during the reign of her son, Chikka Devaraja.

== Family and marriage ==
Amritamma was the daughter of the nobleman Bale Urs of the Mugur clan from Thirumakudalu Narasipura. She was Prince Dodda Devaraja's first wife, and when she married him, she was honored as his one and only consort (dharmapatni). Amritamma was described as an "ldeal lady" and was devoted to her husband.

== As Dowager Queen ==
After the death of Dodda Kempadevaraja, Chikka Devaraja became the new Wodeyar king, making Amritamma the queen mother.

Magnanimous and philanthropic, was a spiritually incined woman who made endowments for religious sites. After the death of Kempadevaraja, she commisoned the construction of a kalamatha (a math made of stone) to be built in the old palace at Hangala and arranged for a lingam to be placed on the ground, marking the place where he had died. An inscription at Hangala states that she gifted the village of Horakeri Bachali to a prominent virashaiva guru. She is recorded to have built an independent math for Maraja Basavalinga-Devaru and additionally granted a stone charter. She predeceased her husband, and a votive mantapa bearing her name at the eastern Namathirta pavilion in Melkote was erected in her honor.
