= Battle of Banavar =

1682 battle between Maratha and Mysore

- Part of Maratha-Mysore War (1682)
Date	June 1682
Location	Banavar, Hassan district, Karnataka
Result	Mysore victory

Belligerents
Maratha Empire; Thanjavur Maratha Kingdom; Golconda Sultanate; Nayakas of Keladi	Kingdom of Mysore

Commanders and leaders
Sambhaji; Kavi Kalash; Harji Raje Mahadik; Ekoji I Basappa Nayak	Chikka Devaraja; Kumaraiya

Units involved
10,000 cavalry under Sambhaji; 10,000 forces of Golconda Sultanate; 5,000 forces of Chenna Basappa Nayak	Unknown army under Kumaraiya; 15,000 archers of Chikkadevaraya

Strength
25,000	Unknown standing 15,000 archer contingent

Casualties and losses
Heavy	Unknown

Battle of Banavar was a land battle fought between the Maratha Empire and the Kingdom of Mysore in the year 1682.The Mysore forces under King Chikka Devaraja defeated the Maratha forces and their allies under Sambhaji, forcing him to retreat temporarily.

== Background ==
Sambhaji's grandfather Shahaji had conquered territories in the modern state of Karnataka. Mohammed Adil Shah, Sultan of Bijapur granted him the Jagir of Bangalore. This was the entry of the Marathas in the Southern India.

Shivaji had established Maratha territories in the Southern India in his two-year-long campaign of 1676–78. The Maratha Empire and the Kingdom of Mysore were the main contenders to dominate the region. The relationship between the two kingdoms was hostile. Marathas attacked Srirangapatna in 1681, but they were defeated. Trichinapoly, which was under Chokkanath, the ruler of Madurai, was coveted by Chikkadevaraya. Chokkanath called for the help of Jinji's Maratha commander Harji Mahadik. Kumarayya, the Mysore commander, with a view to isolating Chokkanath from the Marathas tried to bribe Harji Mahadik liberally thinking that he would prove disloyal to Sambhaji and give as assurance of leaving Jinji. Meanwhile, Kumarayya had stealthily written to Chikkadevaraya requesting him to send reinforcements immediately. But his letter fell into the hands of Marathas.

When Haraji learnt all this, he was furious and was determined to attack the Mysore capital Srirangapattana itself with all his might. He despatched a big force under the command of Dadaji Kakade, Jaitaji Katkar and others against Srirangapattana. Entering the Mysore territory these commanders encamped at Kottatti and Kasalagere situated in the modern Mandya district. Chikkadevaraya immediately ordered Kumarayya to attack Harji. Maratha Sardar Harji Raje Mahadik then defeated the Mysore general Kumaraiya. Both forces had tried to subdue each other resulting in a stalemate. Sambhaji attacked the Kingdom of Mysore in June 1682 with his allies - the Nayakas of Keladi and Qutb Shahi dynasty. Allied forces reached Banavar in June 1682. Lingappa, the Mysore officer at Banavar, told this news to Chikkadevaraya.

== Battle ==
Upon hearing the news, Chikkadevaraya left Mysore his strong contingent of 15,000 expert archers. He wanted to attack before the allies settled in the region. Both sides prepared for the battle. And the battle began with small skirmishes.

Soon, Chikkadevaraya realised that the allied forces did not have archers. He arranged his archers in a semicircular formation and started showering arrows on the allied army. The Marathas did not expect this and the arrows started mounting casualties In the allied army. Maratha commanders tried but were unable to stop the rout. Some more reinforcements joined the Marathas during the battle, but they suffered heavy casualties in the battle. The Mysore archers took a break for dinner in the night. Sambhaji decided to change directions to avoid more casualties and he retreated towards Thanjavur in the east to get more supplies. He returned with contingents equipped with oil coated shot-proof leather jackets, and explosive arrows to counter the Mysore archers.

== Aftermath ==
This was a significant victory for Mysore forces and Chikkadevaraja marked it with an inscription. Sambhaji then defeated Chikkadevaraya in the ensuing battles with his new innovations. Sambhaji captured several fortresses in northern Madurai region.
