= Indian War =

Indian War may refer to:

- American Indian Wars, name generally used in the United States to describe conflicts between the colonial or federal government and the native people of North America.
- Mexican Indian Wars, name generally used to describe conflicts between the Spanish, or Mexican, colonial or federal government, and the native people of North America.
- List of wars involving India and List of wars in the Indian subcontinent.

== See also ==
- The Indian War of Independence (disambiguation)
- Hindu mythological wars
- Mughal war of succession (disambiguation)
- East Indies campaign (disambiguation)
