= Battle of Madurai (1656) =

1656 battle in South India

- Part of Madurai-Mysore Wars
Date	1656
Location	Madurai, India
Result	Madurai victory

Belligerents
Madurai Nayakas: Kingdom of Ramnad	Kingdom of Mysore

Commanders and leaders
Tirumala Nayaka; Raghunatha Sethupathi; Kumara Muttu	Kanthirava Narasaraja I Hampaiya

Strength
Madurai Army: 35,000; Ramnad Army: 25,000	Unknown Mysore Reinforcements: 25,000

Casualties and losses
12,000	12,000

The Battle of Madurai in 1656 was fought between the forces of Kingdom of Mysore and the Madurai Nayaks, with strong support from the Maravars. The Mysore army first made gains and advanced close to Madurai creating fear in the city. At this critical moment the Maravar king Raghunatha Sethupathi came to the Nayak’s aid with a large force which changed the course of the battle. After fierce fighting and heavy losses on both sides the Mysore army was defeated and driven back towards Dindigul.

== Background ==
After the Bijapur general Khan-i-Khanan left Mysore the king of Mysore accused Tirumala Nayaka of disloyalty and to take revenge and recover the cost of the war sent an army to seize the border province of Satyamangalam. The Mysore general Hampaiya met no resistance, captured the capital, and collected large amounts of booty. Encouraged by this easy success he went beyond the king’s orders and marched towards Madurai without meeting any enemy. His sudden arrival shocked the Nayak of Madurai who almost abandoned the city and thought of fleeing into the forests. Madurai would have fallen but it was saved at the last moment by the timely support of the Maravars.

When the king of the Maravars Raghunatha Sethupathi learned about the danger facing the Nayak to whom he was a loyal vassal he acted quickly. In a single day he gathered twenty-five thousand soldiers and marched with them to Madurai placing his army between the city walls and the besieging forces. This timely support gave the Nayak new confidence. He then raised his own army of thirty-five thousand men and together they became stronger in numbers than their enemy.

== Battle ==
The Mysore general not strong enough to risk a direct battle and waiting for reinforcements from his king tried to delay the fight. He used gifts to win over the Brahman commander of the Madurai forces who then slowed down the attack and tried to weaken the spirit of his own soldiers. The Maravars soon grew suspicious of this delay accused the Brahman of treason, imprisoned him, and suddenly attacked the enemy killing many of them. The surviving Mysore troops escaped to a nearby fortress where they were later joined by twenty thousand reinforcements. After this the fighting began again with great violence and nearly twelve thousand men from each side were left dead on the battlefield.

== Aftermath ==
The Mysore army was pushed back as far as the borders of the Dindigul province. It was the bravery of the Sethupathi that secured victory for Madurai and forced the Mysore forces to withdraw in defeat. Pleased with his courage and loyalty Tirumala Nayaka honoured him with the title Tirumalai Sethupathi, gave him rich and valuable gifts, and completely cancelled the tribute he had been paying.

== See also ==
- Battle of Erode
- Madurai–Mysore Wars
- Tirumala Nayaka
