= West Indies Campaign =

West Indies Campaign may refer to:

- Dutch West Indies campaign (1781–1782), a series of minor conflicts, in the Fourth Anglo-Dutch War and the Anglo-French War
- West Indies Campaign (1793–1798), series of military contests mainly in the Caribbean spanning the French Revolutionary Wars
- West Indies Campaign (1803–1810), series of military contests mainly in the Caribbean spanning the Napoleonic Wars

== See also ==
- East Indies campaign (disambiguation)
- West Indies Campaign Medal, a decoration of the U.S. Navy and Marine Corps, issued for service in the West Indies campaign (1898) of the Spanish–American War
