= Battle of Erode =

1667 battle in Tamil Nadu, south India

- Part of Madurai-Mysore Wars
Date	1667
Location	Erode, India
Result	Mysore victory
Territorial changes	Mysore Kingdom solidified its control over Erode, Dharapuram, Omaluru

Belligerents
Vijayanagar Empire; Bijapur Sultanate; Madurai Nayakas; Nayaks of Kalahasti	Kingdom of Mysore

Commanders and leaders
Sriranga III; Vedoji Pant; Anantoji Pant; Chokkanatha Nayak; Lingama Nayaka; Damarla Ayyappa Nayaka †	Chikkadevaraja; Kumaraiya

Strength
100,000 Infantry; 100 Elephants	

The Battle of Erode fought in 1667, was a conflict between the Confederacy Army of the Vijayanagar Empire, Madurai Nayakas, Bijapur Sultanate, Nayaks of Kalahasti led by Chokkanatha Nayak The king of Madurai and the Mysorean forces, commanded by Chikkadevaraja. The battle occurred to restore the lands of Sriranga III and curb the power of expanding Mysore Kingdom, under the leadership of the Dodda Kempadevaraja Wodeyar the allied forces besieged Erode. Mysore army defeated the confederate army in the battle and secured its control over Erode, Dharapuram, Vamulur.

== Background ==
Following the decline of the Vijayanagara Empire in southern India. And the fall of Hassan and Sakkarepatna in 1663 to Mysore marked a significant blow to the Sriranga III, prompting Sriranga, the deposed ruler of Vijayanagara, to flee to Madurai, where he sought the support of Chokkanatha Nayak, the king of Madurai. Sriranga’s presence in Madurai was a strategic move, as Chokkanatha, who had long been wary of the expanding power of Mysore under Dodda Kempadevaraja Wodeyar, saw an opportunity to weaken Mysore and restore the fortunes of the Vijayanagara Empire. Chokkanatha, driven by his own ambitions and resentment toward Mysore’s growing influence, forged an alliance with Bijapur Maratha chiefs Vedoji and Anantoji, both influential leaders in the Carnatic region, as well as with Damarla Aiyappa Nayaka, a local Jagirdar. Together, these allies formed a confederacy united in their opposition to Mysore’s expansionist ambitions. Their primary aim was to restore Sriranga to power, thereby neutralizing the growing Mysore threat. Mysore, however represented the new political and military force in the region, capitalizing on the power vacuum left by the fall of Vijayanagara and steadily consolidating its strength. For Sriranga III, the rise of Mysore was a bitter reminder of the decline of his own kingdom, and he was determined to reclaim the kingdom.

== Battle ==
The confederate forces, united in their mission to challenge Mysore’s growing power, assembled a formidable army to lay siege to Erode. The army, which numbered around one lakh infantry, along with one hundred elephants and numerous cavalry, advanced towards the fort of Erode in the southeast of Mysore.

When Doddadevaraja Wodeyar learned of the formation of the confederacy and the march of the allied forces toward Erode, he swiftly mobilized his own military response. He entrusted the defense of his kingdom to his nephew, Chikkadevaraja and his general Kumaraiya who was appointed to lead the Mysorean army against the advancing confederate forces. The allied army, commanded by Tupakada Linganna Nayaka, the general of Chokkanatha Nayak.

The march of the Mysore army towards Erode sparked a sense of panic in Chokkanatha, as he began to realize the fragility of the confederacy. While the various factions had united under the banner of supporting Sriranga III, their true motivations were far from aligned. The members of the confederacy, including the Bijapur Maratha Sardars from Tanjore and Gingee, had joined not out of genuine loyalty to Sriranga, but to curb the rising power of Doddadevaraja Wodeyar and to exact personal revenge. The Bijapur Marathas’ participation was particularly uncertain, as their actions were independent driven more by their personal grievances against Mysore.Moreover, the confederacy was a loosely organized and poorly coordinated coalition, lacking a unified strategy or clear leadership. While numerically impressive, the confederate army was undisciplined and lacked the training that had made the Mysore forces formidable. The Mysorean army, under the leadership of Doddadevaraja and his nephew Chikkadevaraja, had earned a reputation for its military prowess, having secured numerous victories under previous rulers like Kanthirava Narasaraja I and Devaraja Wodeyar. This stark contrast in discipline and experience led Chokkanatha to realize that the confederate forces, despite their numerical strength, were ill-equipped to face the well-organized and battle hardened Mysorean army.

Chokkanatha's sudden retreat to Tiruchirapalli, driven by fear of impending danger, marked a critical turning point in the campaign. His flight, followed by Sriranga, caused confusion and disarray among the united confederate forces, effectively fracturing their alliance. Meanwhile, the Mysore army arrived to relieve Erode, where they engaged in a fierce battle. The confederate forces, led by Aiyapa Nayaka and Anantoji, were decisively defeated, with Aiyapa Nayaka killed and Anantoji forced to flee. The Mysore forces not only secured Erode but also captured Dharapuram and Vamalur, advancing further to Tiruchirapalli. There, Chokkanatha was compelled to submit to Mysore.

== Aftermath ==
The defeat of the confederate forces at Erode was a significant triumph for Dodda Kempadevaraja, as it marked the end of Sriranga's efforts to undermine Mysore's influence. This battle effectively thwarted Sriranga III's ambitions to diminish Mysore's power and solidified Doddadevaraja's position. It was the final confrontation between the two, with Sriranga losing the lands he went penukonda in 1668 and ruled till 1672. The subsequent defeat of the allied forces at Madurai further demonstrated the growing strength of Mysore, establishing it as a dominant power in Karnataka.

== See also ==
- Madurai Nayakas
- Mysore Kingdom
- Sriranga III
