= Mysore Invasions of Samballi =

- Part of Madurai-Mysore Wars
Date	March 1641 – July 1642
Location	Madurai, India
Result	Mysore victory

Belligerents
Madurai Nayakas: Chief of Samballi	Kingdom of Mysore

Commanders and leaders
Tirumala Nayaka; Pattadaiya; Ponnumulai Gouda (POW); Puli Gouda (POW); Chinna Venkataramana (POW); Srinivasa (POW)	Kanthirava Narasaraja I Nanjarajaiya

Strength
At Marathalli : 100,000 At Samballi : 4,000–5,000 cavalry 100,000 infantry hundred elephants	Unknown

Casualties and losses
Heavy	Heavy

The Mysore invasions of Samballi took place between 1641 and 1642 during the reign of Kanthirava Narasaraja I. Led by the able commander Dalavai Nanjarajaiya Mysore forces attacked Samballi after its chief challenged Mysore authority with support from Tirumala Nayaka of Madurai. Through a series of decisive battles, Nanjarajaiya defeated the enemy armies, recaptured lost towns, and drove back even the forces led by Tirumala Nayaka. By the end of the campaigns Mysore had secured Samballi and several nearby regions, strengthening its control in the south and south-east.

== Background ==
Tirumala Nayaka of Madurai took advantage of the troubles faced by Kanthirava with the Bijapur Sultanate and began his attack on Mysore. He encouraged Pattadaiya, the eldest son of Ghatta Mudaliar the Kongu chief of Samballi to cross into Mysore territory. Pattadaiya had grown very proud after defeating nearby polygars and had taken for himself the title Vannanga-mudi, meaning the unbending or unconquerable chief.

== Invasions ==
=== Siege of Marathahalli ===
Around the middle of March 1641, Kanthirava launched a campaign against chief of Samballi. His commander Dalavai Nanjarajaiya began the attack by laying siege to Marathahalli which was under Samballi. The chief came forward with a very large army said to number nearly one lakh of soldiers including troops from Madurai. Even so Nanjarajaiya defeated him captured Marathahalli and Samballi and returned to Srirangapatnam with elephants and horses taken during the siege.

=== Battle of Alambadu ===
Early in 1642, the chief of Samballi retaliated back by gathering his scattered forces and capturing Alambadu, a Mysore territory where he set up camp. Dalavai Nanjarajaiya quickly marched against him and in a fast and decisive battle forced him to retreat with heavy losses. Several important chiefs who supported Samballi including Ponnumalai Gouda, Puli Gouda, Chinna Venkataramana, and Srinivasa, were captured. After this victory Nanjarajaiya took control of Singanallur and Dantahalli in March 1642 and finally stopped his advance at Toleya.

=== First Battle of Samballi ===
Meanwhile the chief of Samballi asked for help from Tirumala Nayaka of Madurai and prepared to defend Samballi with a large army. This force was said to include four to five thousand cavalry, nearly a lakh of infantry, and hundreds of elephants. In the battle that followed Dalavai Nanjarajaiya created confusion and panic among the enemy ranks and defeated them with heavy losses. Samballi was recaptured by Nanjarajaiya, who then returned to Seringapatam after placing guards in the town. Shocked by this defeat, Tirumala Nayaka of Madurai decided to march personally with his main army to recover Samballi.

=== Second Battle of Samballi ===
Nanjarajaiya moved quickly to relieve Samballi and met the forces of Tirumala Nayaka on the way. He offered strong resistance defeating the Nayaka’s army. During the battle he captured the royal insignia and looted the enemy camp forcing the siege to be lifted. After this victory Nanjarajaiya marched south seized Tiruvannamalai, Tiruchengode, and Tiruchirappalli, and then returned to Seringapatam.

== Aftermath ==
Between March 1641 and July 1642, these campaigns greatly strengthened the Kingdom of Mysore. As a result of continuous military action Mysore brought several important areas under its control including Samballi, Dantahalli, Singanallur, Kaveripuram, Toleya, Changappadi, and Marathahalli. These gains expanded Mysore’s power in the southern and south-eastern regions.

== See also ==
- Battle of Erode
