= East Indies campaign =

The East Indies campaign may refer to:

- The First Carnatic War
- The Second Carnatic War
- The Third Carnatic War
- The East Indies Campaign of the Anglo-French War (1778–1783)
- The East Indies theatre of the French Revolutionary Wars

== See also ==
- West Indies Campaign (disambiguation)
- War of the League of the Indies
- Indian War (disambiguation)
