= Hangala =

Village in Karnataka, India

- village
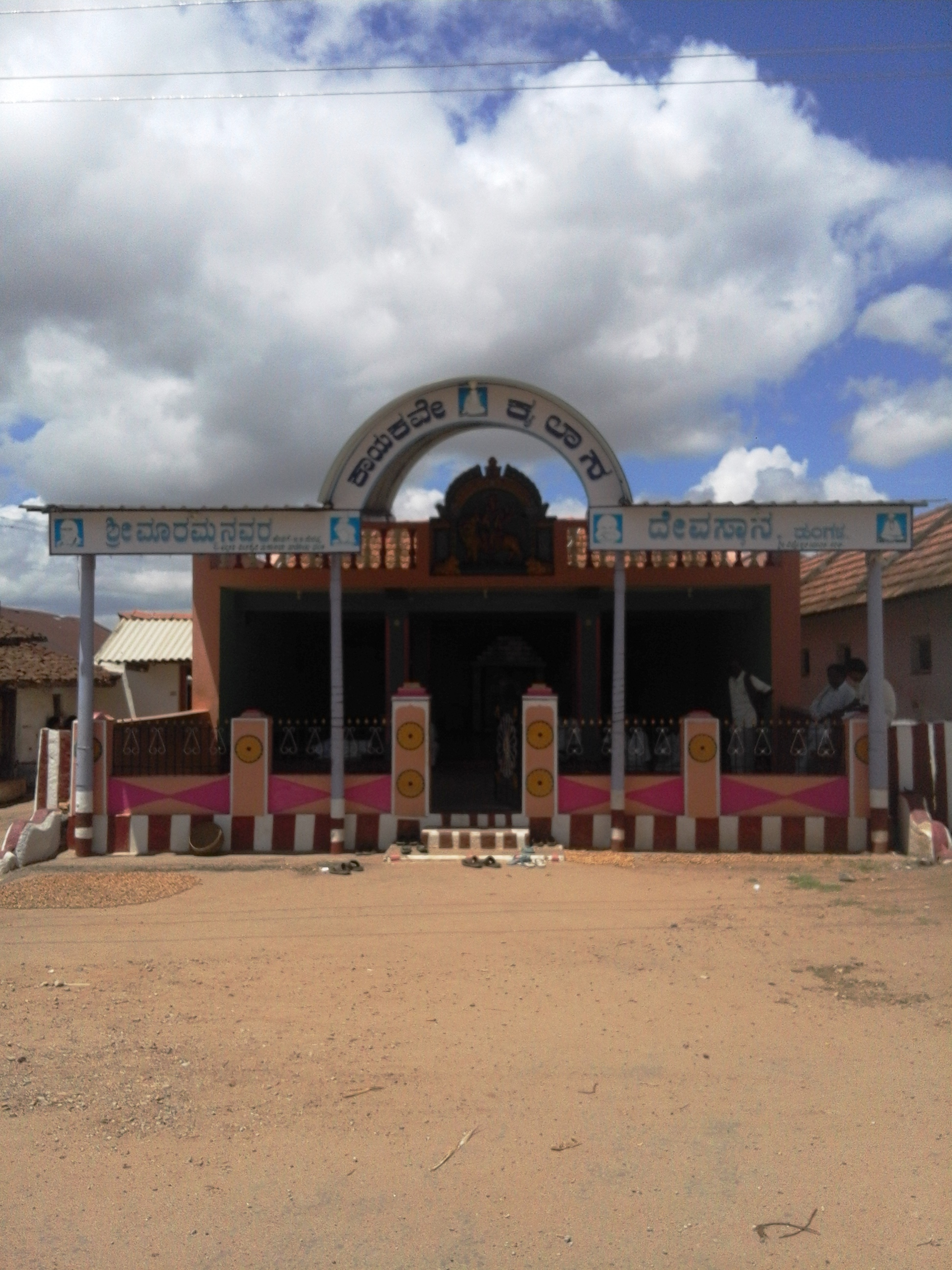
- Mariamma Temple, Hangala

- Location in Karnataka, India Hangala (India)
- Coordinates: 11.80°N 77.69°E
- Country: India
- State: Karnataka
- District: Chamarajanagar
- Talukas: Gundlupet

Government
  - Body: Gram panchayat

Population (2001)
  - Total: 5,597

Languages
  - Official: Kannada
- Time zone: UTC+5:30 (IST)
- ISO 3166 code: IN-KA
- Vehicle registration: KA
- Website: karnataka.gov.in

Hangala is a village in the southern state of Karnataka, India. It is located in the Gundlupet taluk of Chamarajanagar district.

== Demographics ==
As of 2001 India census, Hangala had a population of 5,597 with 2,835 males and 2,762 females.

== Country Code and STD Code ==
+91 08229

== Tourist attractions ==
Gopalaswamy Hills is 18 km from Hangala.

== Image gallery ==
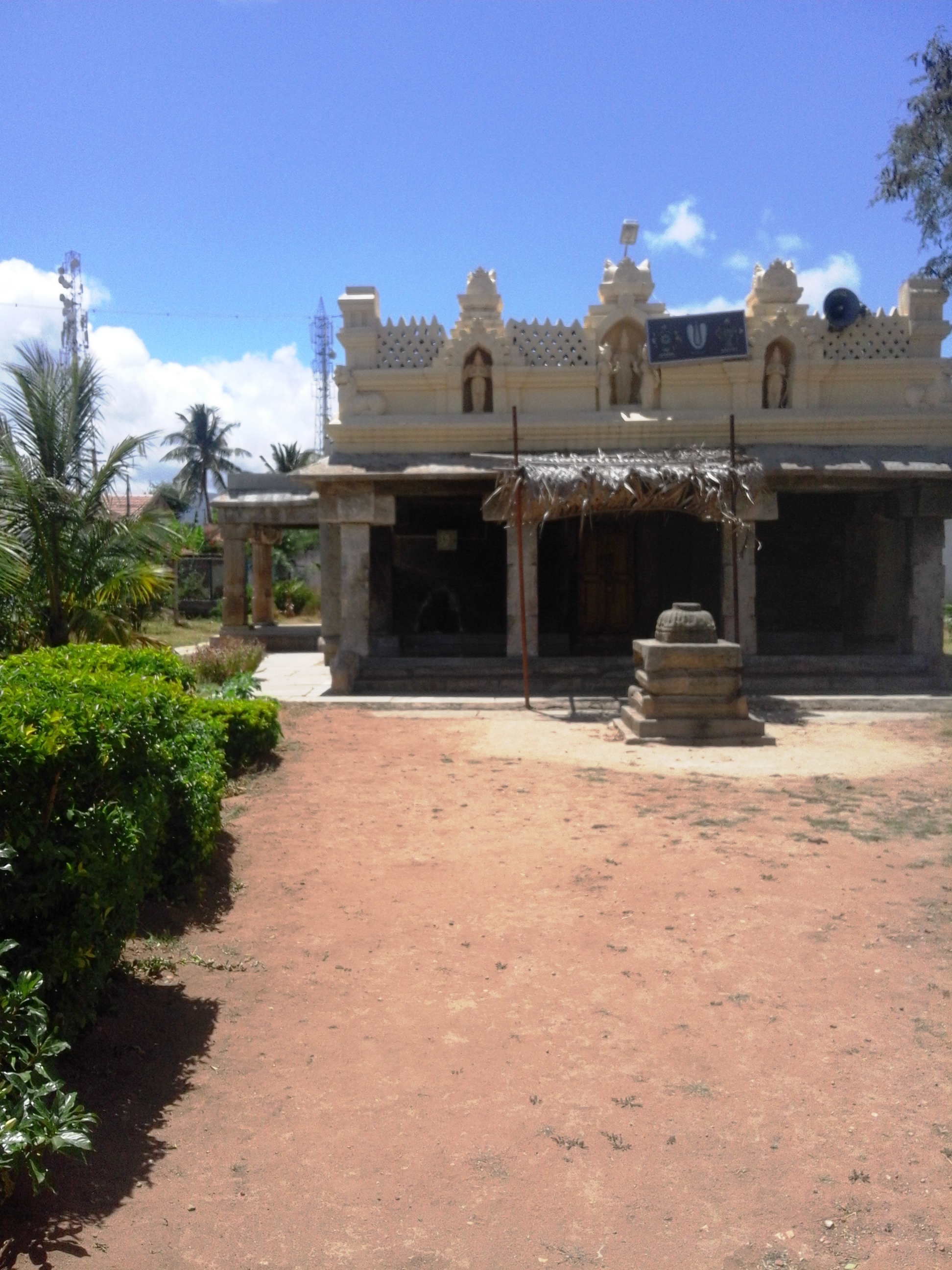
Varadaraja Temple

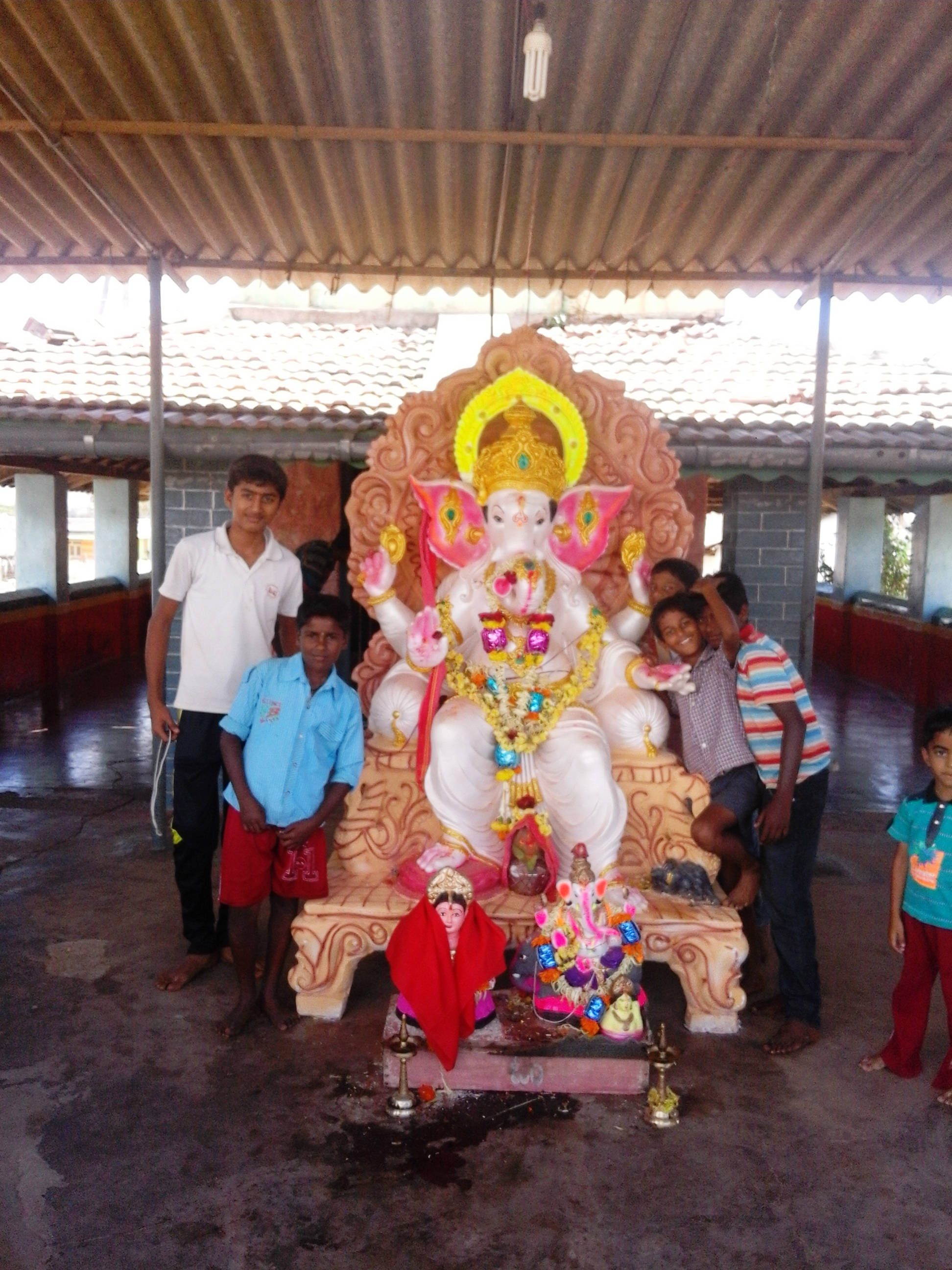
Children of Hangala

== See also ==
- Chamarajanagar
- Districts of Karnataka
