= Battle of Changi (1603) =

1603 naval battle of the Dutch-Portuguese War

- Part of Dutch–Portuguese War
Date	10 October 1603
Location	Johor River
Result	Dutch victory

Belligerents
Dutch Republic	(Portugal) Portuguese Empire

Commanders and leaders
(Dutch Republic) Jacob Pietersz van Enkhuysen	(Portugal) Teixeira de Macedo

Strength
4 ships	40 vessels

Casualties and losses
5–6 dead, several wounded	Many Soldados, and damage to the armada

The 1603 naval battle at Changi between the Dutch and Portuguese showcased the Dutch strength and determination to challenge Portuguese dominance in Southeast Asia. The Dutch damaged the Portuguese flagship, and inflicted many casualties among the Portuguese, causing the flagship to take on water, and the remaining Portuguese ships retreated.

== Background ==
During the 17th century, the Dutch Republic and the Portuguese Empire were engaged in a period of intense rivalry and competition called the Dutch–Portuguese War in which the Dutch took almost all Portuguese possessions in Southeast Asia. It often escalated into armed conflicts. This rivalry primarily revolved around their economic and colonial interests, particularly in the lucrative spice trade of Southeast Asia, and in many other parts of the world.

The Santa Catarina incident was a notable event in which the Dutch captured a Portuguese ship and took it back to Amsterdam, resulting in significant wealth for the Dutch. As a consequence, the Portuguese decided to undertake a punitive expedition against the Johoreans, who were seen as allies of the Dutch during the incident. In late September 1603 the Dutch made contact with Johor fishermen who told them about a Portuguese blockade, and the Dutch decided to take action.

== The Battle ==
On October 10, 1603, Dutch ships sailed up the Johor River and encountered the Portuguese armada near Johor Lama. The Dutch targeted the Portuguese flagship, Todos os Santos, damaging its sails and hindering its maneuverability. They continued to attack with artillery fire, causing the flagship to take on water. The remaining Portuguese ships chose to retreat and regroup off the northern coast of Batam. The ruling family of Johor observed the battle from their galleys, as well as from the Dutch flagship.

== Ships involved ==
- Netherlands
  - Zerikzee
  - Hollandsche Tuin
  - Maagd van Enkhuysen
  - Papagaaiken
- Portugal
  - The Portuguese armada consisted of about 40 vessels, mostly smaller craft and one galleon named the Todos os Santos (All Saints).
