= Tirumalarya =

Tirumalarya could refer to two Kannada poets in the Wodeyar court.

In the court of Raja Wodeyar, Tirumala Iyengar or Tirumalarya the elder (1600) composed the Karna Vrittanta Kathe in Kannada in sangatya metre. According to tradition, Tirumalarya was a descendant of Kirangooru Anantaraya, an acharya (teacher) nominated by the 11th century philosopher Ramanujacharya.

Among well known scholars, Tirumalarya (son of the earlier Tirumalarya in the court of Raja Wodeyar), a native of Srirangapatna and a childhood friend of the king, was the court poet. He was also a minister in the court of the Queen of Madurai. Well known among his writings in Kannada are Chikka Devaraja Saptapadi (1698), a musical treatise and a eulogy for his patron king rendered in seven sections with fifty-two songs. In this work, the poet exalts the king to the level of "God on Earth". It is, along with Geetha Gopala, considered one of the more important 17th century treatises on music. Tirumalarya's other well-known contributions in Kannada are Apratimavira Charite, a eulogy for his patron king, Chikkadevaraja Vijaya, an account of the king's conquests in sixteen chapters and Chikkadevaraja Vamshavali, the earliest available Kannada prose historical writing, describing the king's ancestry. In addition, he composed in tripadi, sangatya, kirtanas and other devotional songs in Kannada and Telugu.
