= Battle of Vedalai =

1549 battle between Portugal and Vijayanagara

- Part of Vijayanagar-Portuguese Conflicts
Date	1549
Location	Vedalai, Tamilnadu, India
Result	Vijayanagara victory

Belligerents
Vijayanagara Empire: Madurai Nayakas	Portuguese Empire

Commanders and leaders
Vitthala	(Portuguese Empire) João Fernandes Correa

Strength
6,000	40

The Battle of Vedalai took place in 1549 when Joao Fernandes Correa, the Portuguese captain at Vedalai, imposed tolls on Hindu pilgrims traveling to Rameswaram. This angered the Brahmins who sought assistance from Madurai leading to a Badaga invasion. A force of 6,000 soldiers, including some Muslim allies, attacked the Portuguese fort. Unable to resist, Correa and his men retreated to the coastal islands, along with many Paravas. During the chaos, Fr. Antonio Criminali, a Jesuit priest, was killed while protecting Christian converts. The fort and chapel were destroyed, and the trench blocking the pilgrimage route was filled in.

== Background ==
The Portuguese possessions on the Coromandel Coast extended up to Rameswaram, strategically positioning them close to the maritime routes leading to Ceylon. In the village of Vedalai, located on the frontier of the Marava kingdom, the Portuguese constructed a mud fort, which served as an important military outpost. This fort was always manned by a small garrison under the command of a Portuguese captain, ensuring control over the region and monitoring movements between India and Ceylon. Historical accounts, including those of Correa, mention that the Governor of Cochin personally inspected the fortress at Beadala (Vedalai), emphasizing its significance in Portuguese defense strategy. Positioned near the sandbanks of Chilao (Ceylon).

In 1549, a Portuguese garrison of forty soldiers was stationed at Vedalai under the command of João Fernandes Correa. His excessive greed led to tensions with the local population and ultimately provoked an attack by the Badagas. Correa ordered the digging of a trench near his fort, blocking the traditional route of Hindu pilgrims traveling to the Rameswaram temple one of the most revered shrines in southern India. As a result, pilgrims were forced to pay tolls to the Portuguese significantly reducing the alms received by the Brahmins at the temple. Over time, the dwindling revenues angered the temple authorities, who sought assistance from the rulers of Madurai likely through the Setupati of Ramnad who controlled the causeway to Rameswaram. Their appeal led to a Badaga invasion.

== Battle ==
In 1549, a force of six thousand soldiers, including Muhammadans and Madurai forces suddenly appeared before Vedalai. The Portuguese garrison, under João Fernandes Correa, found itself vastly outnumbered and lacking sufficient ammunition to mount a defense. Realizing the futility of resistance, Correa and his men retreated towards the sea, seeking refuge on the nearby coastal islands. Many Paravas also attempted to escape, but their small boats could not accommodate the entire population, leaving a significant number of people behind as the invading forces took control of the area.

In 1549, Father Antonio Criminali, an Italian Jesuit and Superior of the Parava missions, was in Rameswaram instructing newly baptized Christians when news arrived of the approaching Badaga forces. Determined to protect his flock, he fled to Vedalai and helped transport many Paravas to safety. Refusing to leave until all his people had escaped, he walked to the small chapel of St. Vincent, where many had sought refuge. On his way, he encountered Madurai forces soldiers, with the first two detachments sparing him. However, a third detachment included a Muhammadan horseman who struck him with a lance, wounding his side. Though he managed to get up and continue, more soldiers soon arrived and beheaded him. His head was placed on a spike over the chapel door as a display of victory. Several Paravas were also killed or taken captive, and the chapel and fort were completely destroyed. According to some accounts, his head and garments were later taken to the temple at Tiruchendur as war trophies.

== Aftermath ==
According to Jesuit chronicles, after their attack on Vedalai, the Badaga soldiers proceeded to Rameswaram to take a ritual bath in the sea. Following this event, records from the History of the Karnataka Governors mention that Vishwanatha Nayak took measures to protect the pilgrims traveling to Rameswaram.

== See also ==
- Paravas
- Portuguese Empire
- Vijayanagara Empire
