= Madurai–Mysore Wars =

1617–1694 conflicts in Deccan

Conflicts between Madurai and Mysore
Date	1617–1694
Location	Tamilnadu, Karnataka
Result	Madurai Nayak victory: Expulsion of Mysoreans from Madurai; End of Mysore's expansion into Madurai

Belligerents
Madurai Nayakas; Supported by: Vijayanagar Empire; Maratha Kingdom; Bijapur Sultanate; Thanjavur Maratha Kingdom; Nayakas of Ikkeri; Kingdom of Ramnad; Nayaks of Kalahasti	Kingdom of Mysore

Commanders and leaders
Madurai Monarchs: Muthu Virappa Nayaka; Tirumala Nayaka; Chokkanatha Nayak (AWOL); Ranga Krishna Muthu Virappa Nayaka; Mangammal; Madurai Generals: Ramaiyan; Ranganna Nayaka; Kumura Muttu; Venkata Krishna Nayaka; Rustum Khan (executed); Sethupathis of Ramnad: Raghunatha Sethupathi; Raghunatha Kilavan; Vijayanagar Emperors: Sriranga III; Bijapur Generals: Anatoji Pant; Vedoji Pant; Nayaka of Kalahasti: Damarla Ayyappa Nayaka †; Ikkeri Nayaks: Somashekara Nayaka I Maratha Monarchs: Sambhaji; Vyankoji; Maratha Generals: Haraji; Dadaji Kakde †; Jaitaji †; Nimbalji †	Mysore Monarchs: Raja Wodeyar I Chamaraja Wodeyar VI; Kanthirava Narasaraja I Dodda Kempadevaraja; Chikkadevaraja; Mysore Generals: Mukilan; Harasura Nandi Raja; Hampaiya; Kumaraiya (POW)

Strength
Unknown	Unknown

The Mysore–Madurai Wars were a series of conflicts fought between the Kingdom of Mysore and the Madurai Nayakas, primarily in the 17th and early 18th centuries, as both sought to expand their territories in Southern India. The wars were driven by the strategic interests of both kingdoms, with the Madurai Nayaks aiming to maintain their dominance over the Tamil-speaking regions, while the Kingdom of Mysore, under its ambitious rulers, sought to extend its influence and control.

== First Mysore Invasion of Madurai ==
Raja Wodeyar I, focusing on his regular conquests and annexations that brought his territories in line with the dominions of Madurai. One notable instance involves the Raja taking advantage of Muttu Virappa's engagement with Tanjore to send an army under the commander ‘Mukilan’ to attack the Dindigul province. This invasion was reportedly repelled by the local Polygars of Virupakshi and Kannivadi, who successfully defended their lands. In recognition of their efforts, the Polegar of Virupakshi was honored with the title ‘Puthari-Kaval’ (Defender of the Roads), and the Polegar of Kannivadi was given the title ‘Chinnu-Mysuran’ (Young Mysorean). While Rangachari speculates that this invasion occurred around 1620, the lack of precise historical records makes it difficult to definitively date the event. Moreover, he connects this period with the death of Raja Wodeyar I, which he claims occurred around that time.

== Second Mysore Invasion of Madurai ==
In the early years of Tirumala Nayaka's reign, an invasion of Madura by the Mysore kingdom, followed by a counter-invasion from Madura, is documented in a Mackenzie Manuscript. The exact cause of Mysore's aggression remains unclear, though it is suggested that Chamaraja Wodeyar VI, the ambitious ruler of Mysore, might have acted without a specific pretext, or perhaps sought to avenge the failed invasion of Madura by his predecessor, in the reign Muthu Virappa Nayaka. The Mysore general, Harasnra Nandi Raja, advanced as far as Dindigul but was repelled by the Madurai forces, including Ramaiyan and Ranganna Nayaka, the polygar of Kannivadi. The Madurai generals are said to have even besieged the capital of Mysore. Nelson and Rangachari offer detailed accounts of these events, including Ramappaiya's recall and disobedience, which did not harm his standing. Ramappaiya's subsequent victory was highly celebrated by Tirumala Nayaka, who likely honored him with the grant of land recorded in the Sri Mukha inscription of 1633, marking his successful campaign against Mysore.

== War of Noses ==
=== Wars between Tirumala Nayaka and Kanthirava Narasaraja ===
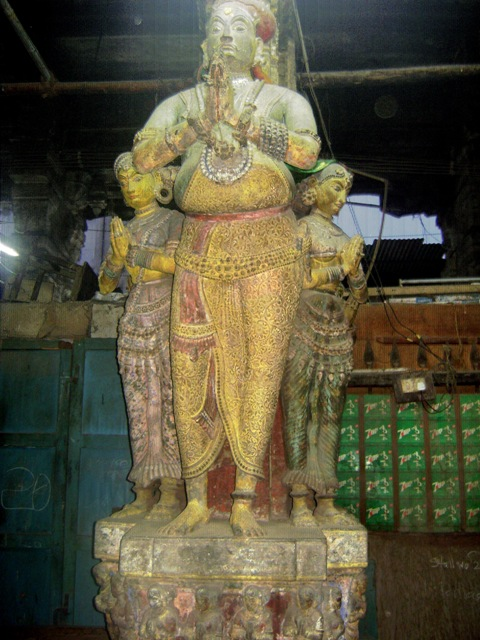
Statue of Tirumala Nayaka

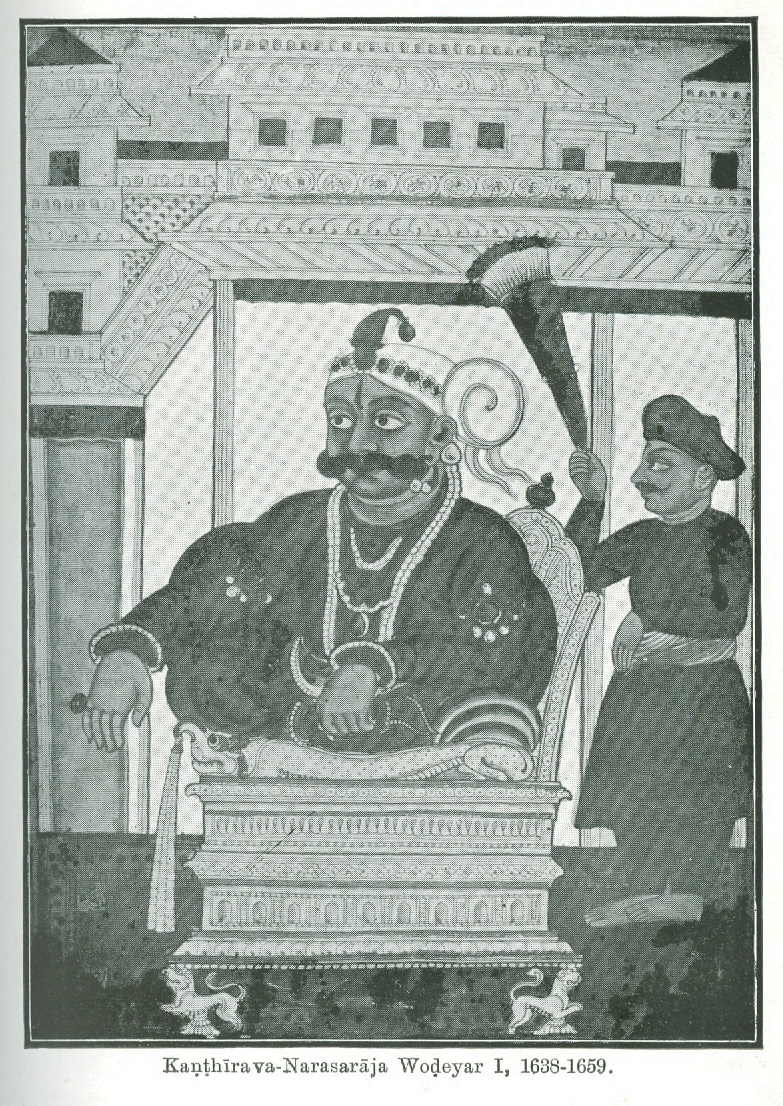
Portrait of Kanthirava Narasaraja

==== First Phase ====
During Kanthirava Narasaraja I Wodeyar's conflicts with Ranadullah Khan, Tirumala Nayaka of Madura took advantage of the situation to destabilize the southern region, often collaborating with local Polygars who were hostile to Mysore. His strategy was to create a diversion by fomenting unrest in the south, thereby forcing Kantirava to address multiple threats simultaneously the invasion of Mysore by Bijapur in the north and the insurrections stirred by Tirumala Nayaka in the south. In early 1641, Pattadaiya, the eldest son of Ghatta Mudaliyar of Samballi, rebelled against Kantirava with support from Tirumala Nayaka and attacked Danayakanakote. However, the Mysore army swiftly responded, defeating Ghatta Mudaliyar's forces at Marathalli in 1641 and again at Samballi in August 1642. The Mysore forces then advanced through Tolya, capturing several territories loyal to Ghatta Mudaliyar, including Nallur, Changapadi, Tiruchengod, and Trichinopoly, before returning to Srirangapattana with significant spoils of war.

==== Second Phase ====
Kanthirava Narasaraja I, the king of Mysore, was determined to exact revenge on Tirumala Nayaka for his collusion with Bijapur, which had brought disastrous consequences upon Mysore. When the Bijapur forces withdrew from Mysore, it provided Kanthirava with the opportunity to launch a punitive invasion of Madurai around 1656. The Mysore army, under the leadership of Dalavay Hampaiya, invaded the province of Satyamangalam, committing horrendous atrocities, including the brutal practice of cutting off the noses of civilians, including women and children, as part of a terrifying campaign of terror. This barbarity became infamous, with contemporary accounts such as J.H. Grose's reference to the "singular methods" of the Mysore troops in their brutal tactics. Despite Tirumala Nayaka being gravely ill and weakened by his condition, he took swift action to defend his kingdom by calling upon his loyal vassal, Raghunatha Setupati, for aid. In response, Setupati mobilized an army of 25,000 Maravas and, with 35,000 additional troops raised under Tirumala's command, he successfully repelled the Mysore forces, driving them back to the borders of Dindigul. A fierce battle ensued, in which both sides suffered heavy casualties, with around 12,000 men lost on each side. The bravery and leadership of Setupati proved pivotal, and the Mysore army, unable to withstand the resistance, was forced to retreat. In gratitude for Setupati's role in saving Madurai, Tirumala Nayaka honored him with the title of Tirumalai Setupati, granted him immense gifts, and relieved him of any further tribute obligations. This victory was highly celebrated, and the History of the Carnataca Governors and Jesuit letters both attribute the defense of Madurai entirely to Setupati's timely intervention. Further sources mention a counter-invasion of Mysore by the Madura army, possibly led by Kumura Muttu, Tirumala's younger brother, and Rangana Nayaka, in which the Mysoreans were pursued to their capital and significant damage was inflicted. It is said that the Madurai army retaliated with the same brutal methods Mysoreans had used in Madura, and even the king of Mysore reportedly lost his nose in this exchange. The Madura forces are believed to have advanced as far as Nanjanakudi (Nanjangud), though Tirumala Nayaka passed away before the completion of this raid. Despite some uncertainty regarding the precise role of Tirumala's younger brother, Kumura Muttu, the evidence from inscriptions, including the 1659 Tiruchchengodu grant, supports the idea that he may have participated in the military campaign against Mysore.

== Confederacy War With Mysore ==
=== War Between Chokkantha Nayaka and Doddadevaraja Wodeyar ===
==== Battle of Erode ====
In 1667, a significant conflict between Mysore and Madurai unfolded, largely driven by Chokkanatha Nayak opposition to Mysore's rising power and his alliance with the fugitive Sriranga III, the former ruler of Vijayanagara. Following the fall of Hassan and Sakkarepatna in 1663, Sriranga had sought refuge in Madura, hoping to regain his lost authority with the help of Chokkanatha. The two leaders, along with a coalition of Bijapuri Maratha chiefs Vedoji Pant from Tanjore and Anoji Pant From Gingee, and Damarla Aiyappa Nayaka The Nayaka of Kalahasti, formed a confederacy to restore Sriranga to power and curb Mysore's expansion. The allied forces, numbering around 100,000 infantry, elephants, and cavalry, laid siege to Erode, but their efforts were doomed from the start. The confederacy was poorly organized, with differing motivations among its members and no unified strategy. The Maratha leaders from Tanjore and Gingee joined out of personal vendettas against Mysore rather than any overarching plan, and the alliance lacked discipline. As the confederate army advanced toward Erode, Mysore's forces, led by Chikkadevaraja, swiftly marched to confront them. Chokkanatha, realizing the fragility of his alliance and the strength of the Mysore army, abandoned the campaign and retreated to Tiruchirappalli, followed by Sriranga. This created confusion and division within the confederacy, leading to a defeat. Aiyappa Nayaka was killed, and Anantoji was forced to flee, leaving the confederate forces decimated. Mysore solidified its control over Erode, Dharapuram, and Vamalur, and even marched to Tiruchirappalli, forcing Chokkanatha to submit. This victory marked a decisive moment in the rise of Mysore as the dominant power in Karnataka, effectively quashing Sriranga's hopes of diminishing Mysore's influence and establishing the kingdom's strength under Dodda Kempadevaraja .

=== War Between Chokkanatha Nayak and Chikkadeva Wodeyar ===
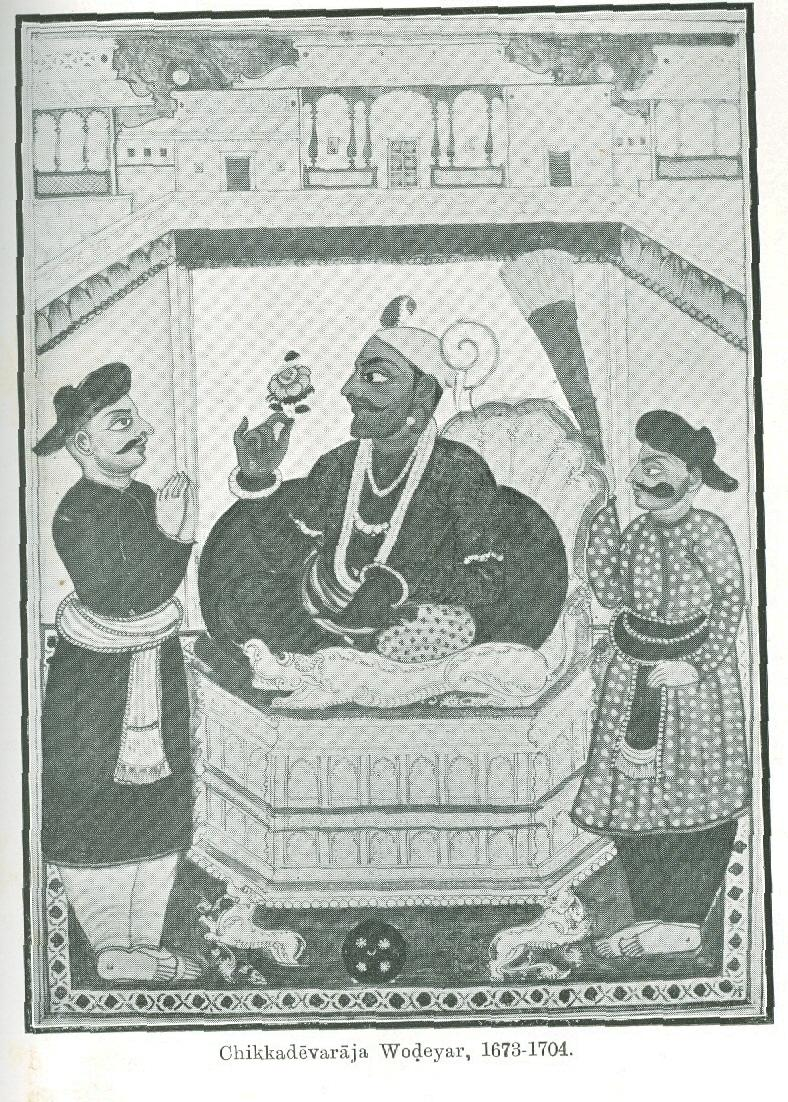
Chikkadevaraja

Chokkanatha Nayak, the ruler of Madurai, had long nurtured a desire for revenge after his humiliation at the Battle of Erode in 1667, during the reign of Dodda Kempadevaraja. Seizing the opportunity following Doddadevaraja's death, Chokkanatha reorganized his forces and sought to invade Mysore. In an alliance with Ikkeri, he launched a two-pronged attack, with Madurai invading in the south and Ikkeri invading from the north. However, the Mysorean forces, led by Chikkadevaraja, defeated the Madurai army at Maduvana. Under the command of Venkata Krishna Nayaka, who bore the title "Sangora Kirita" (Crown of Battle), the Madura forces were routed in a fierce confrontation. The Mysoreans inflicted heavy losses on the invaders, capturing not only soldiers and ammunition but also war horses, elephants, and crucial forts like Paramatripura, Malai, Muttanjatti, Sadamangalam, Anantagiri, Torenad, Ariyalur, Dharmapuram, Salem. The victorious Mysoreans returned with vast booty.

=== Chokkanatha's Alliance With Marathas Against Mysore ===
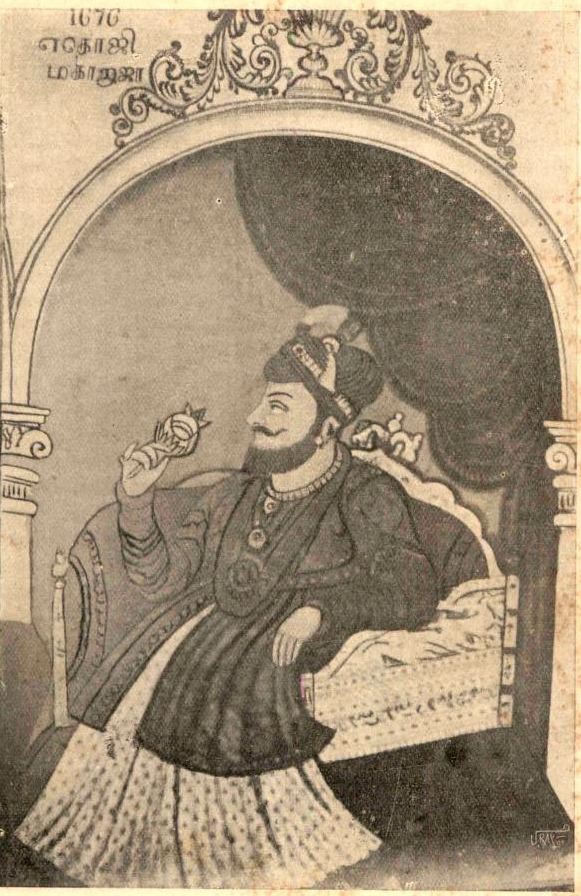
Ekoji Raje Bhosale

==== Siege of Tiruchirapalli And Battle of Mandya ====
In the year 1680. Mysore, under Chikkadevaraja, sought to extend its influence by assisting the weakening Chokkanatha Nayak of Madurai, defeating the usurper Rustum Khan, and demanding Tiruchirapalli as the price for his support. This move alarmed the Marathas, who saw the acquisition of Tiruchirapalli as a strategic threat to their interests in the region, particularly with Maratha settlements in nearby Gingee and Tanjore. The Marathas Under Haraji and Vyankoji Bhosale, alongside Chokkanatha, Setupati of Ramnad Raghunatha Kilavan formed a powerful alliance to resist Mysore's expansion. When Kumaraiya, the Mysore general, attempted to counter this confederation, the Marathas under Dadaji Kakde, Nimbaji, Jaitaji launched an attack into Mysore's heartland, threatening Srirangapattana itself. In response, Chikkadevaraja, with the aid of reinforcements from Kumaraiya. A surprise night attack near Mandya caught the Marathas off guard, leading to a devastating defeat in which Maratha Generals Dadaji Kakde, Nimbaji, Jaitaji were killed. This victory solidified Chikkadevaraja's dominance in the region, asserting Mysore's supremacy over Karnataka and impressing contemporaries, including Mughal Emperor Aurangzeb, who praised the strategic brilliance of the Mysore ruler.

==== Allied Victory At Tiruchirapalli ====
The defeat of the Maratha army at Mandya had profound consequences for Kumaraiya at Tiruchirapalli, leading to a sense of humiliation and a desire for retribution in Haraji. As Kumaraiya's position grew increasingly vulnerable, with no reinforcements and no response to his pleas for help, he was left with no choice but to retreat toward Mysore. However, the Marathas, emboldened by his inactivity and perceived weakness, remained vigilant, never letting their guard down. Seizing the opportunity, they launched a sudden and devastating attack on the Mysore forces at Tiruchirapalli, inflicting a defeat and capturing a large number of Mysore officers, including the Kumaraiya. This victory brought immense pride and satisfaction to Arasumalai (Haraji), who, buoyed by his triumph, began driving the Mysoreans out of the Forts they had seized from the Nayaka of Madurai.

=== Expulsion of Mysoreans From Madurai ===
==== Recovery of Madurai ====
In a Jesuit letter from 1686, Muthu Virappa Nayaka is praised for reclaiming the town of Madurai by expelling the Mysoreans and securing the loyalty of his vassals, to the extent that he was able to rule with increasing authoritarianism. This assertion aligns with the evidence provided by an inscription from 1688 at Arumbavur, which records the repair of a sluice by Ranga Krishna, suggesting that by 1686, the Nayaka administration was stable enough for the rulers to focus on internal affairs such as infrastructure projects.

== Conflict Between Chikkadevaraya and Mangammal ==
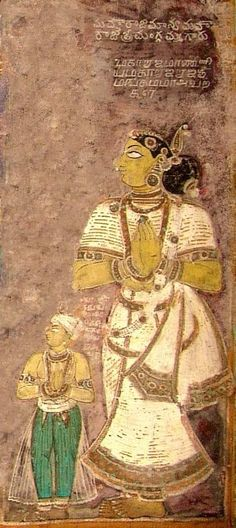
Rani Mangammal

=== End of Madurai-Mysore Wars ===
While Mangammal focused on formulating her policy towards the Mughal Empire, Chikka Devaraja of Mysore was engaged in an aggressive campaign of territorial expansion. By 1690, he had gained control over large parts of the Baramahals and Salem up to the Kaveri River. Between 1690 and 1694, he extended his conquests to most of Bednore and secured a treaty that confirmed his control over these territories. His next target was Madurai, and although Aurangzeb's fear of the Mahrattas led him to adopt a temporarily favorable stance toward Mysore, he was not inclined to show leniency. Chikkadeva Raya expanded further into Salem and Coimbatore, bringing local chiefs under his authority. An inscription from 1695 to 1696 at Avanasli mentions a grant by his prime minister, Dalavay Kumaraiya, who was dispatched to lay siege to Trichinopoly. However, a Mahratta attack on Mysore forced his recall, easing Mangammal's burden. Despite this setback, she successfully repelled the Mysore forces, maintaining her control over the region.

== See also ==
- Madurai Nayakas
- Kingdom of Mysore
- Kingdom of Ramnad
