= Maratha–Mysore War (1682) =

War in Southern India

The Maratha–Mysore War (1682) was a conflict between the Maratha Empire and the Kingdom of Mysore in southern India, driven by their rivalry for regional dominance. Led by Sambhaji, the Marathas defeated Mysore forces under Chikka Devaraja, culminating in the Treaty of Srirangapatna, where Chikka Devaraja paid 1 crore honas as tribute to Sambhaji.

== Background ==
Sambhaji's grandfather, Shahaji, conquered territories in Karnataka, earning the title of Jagir of Bangalore from Mohammed Adil Shah, Sultan of Bijapur. Shivaji expanded Maratha influence in southern India during his 1676–78 campaign. By 1681, tensions escalated as the Marathas attacked Srirangapatna. They faced defeat, although Maratha commander Harji Raje Mahadik overcame Mysore's General Kumaraiya. Sambhaji sought a Deccan alliance against Mughal Emperor Aurangzeb, while Chikka Devaraja allied with Aurangzeb, executing Maratha generals Dadaji Kakade, Jaitaji Katkar, and Santaji Nimbalkar. Enraged, Sambhaji, with allies from the Qutb Shahi dynasty and Nayakas of Hukkeri, attacked Mysore in June 1682, reaching Banavar.

== Battle of Banavar ==
Chikka Devaraja led 15,000 archers to counter the allied forces at Banavar, aiming to strike before they settled. Initial skirmishes escalated as Chikka Devaraja's archers, arranged in a semicircular formation, overwhelmed the allies, who lacked archers. The Marathas suffered heavy casualties, and despite reinforcements, Sambhaji retreated toward Thanjavur.

== Battle of Trichinopoly ==
After resting near Thanjavur for 20 days, Sambhaji gained reinforcements from Hukkeri, Golconda, and his uncle Ekoji I. To counter Mysore's archers, he lured them to the plains near Madurai and besieged Tiruchirappalli, a fortified city with a Mysore garrison under the vassal Chokkanatha Nayak. Sambhaji equipped his army with oil-coated, arrow-proof leather jackets crafted by local cobblers, gathered war elephants, and prepared 300 Maratha archers to fire lit arrows. At dawn, Maratha forces crossed the Kaveri River using boats from nearby villages, surprising the defenders. The leather jackets neutralized Mysore arrows, and elephants breached the city gates, leading to fierce street fighting. By evening, the Marathas captured Tiruchirappalli, though the Tiruchirapalli Rock Fort remained under Mysore control. After Chokkanatha Nayak's death, Sambhaji besieged the fort with 10,000 troops. Maratha archers targeted the fort's ammunition depot with lit arrows, causing an explosion and wall collapse, enabling its capture. The Marathas then sacked the city. Historian Sadashiv Shivde described this victory as a testament to Sambhaji's military strategy.

== Aftermath ==
The defeat at Trichinopoly weakened Chikka Devaraja, prompting several allies to join Sambhaji. The Marathas captured fortresses in northern Madurai, including Dharmapuri and nearby territories. Chikka Devaraja negotiated peace, signing the Treaty of Srirangapatna, paying a 1 crore hona tribute to Sambhaji. A 1682 Jesuit letter noted Chikka Devaraja’s weakened position, stating, "The power of the king of Mysore begins to decline, attacked in his dominions by Sambhaji's troops, unable to sustain his armies." Despite the treaty, conflicts persisted in later years.
