= Dodda Kempadevaraja =

Maharaja of Mysore from 1659 to 1673

Dodda Deva Raja

13th Maharaja of Mysore
- Reign: 19 August 1659 – 11 February 1673
- Predecessor: Kanthirava Narasaraja I
- Successor: Chikka Devaraja
- Born: 25 May 1627
- Died: 11 February 1673 (aged 45)
Names
- Dodda Kempadevaraja Wodeyar
- House: Wodeyar
- Father: Devaraja

Devaraja Wodeyar I (25 May 1627 – 11 February 1673) was the thirteenth maharaja of the Kingdom of Mysore from 1659 until 1673.

== Early years ==
Devaraja Wodeyar I was born on 25 May 1627, the fourth son of Prince Devarajendra Wodeyar, by his second wife, Kempamamba Ammani Avaru. He was imprisoned along with his father at Hengul Fort in 1638, the year of incumbency of his cousin Kanthirava Narasaraja I. He was adopted and appointed heir apparent, with title Yuvaraja on 28 July 1659. He succeeded his cousin on the latter's death on 31 July 1659, and was installed on the Mysore throne on 19 August 1659.

South India during the time of Dodda Kempadevaraja.

== Rule ==
During his rule, the last of the Vijayanagara rulers, Sriranga III, sought refuge in Bednur in Seringapatam. Soon afterwards, Sivappa Nayaka of Kelladi attacked Seringapatam with a large force, with the ostensible intention of restoring Vijayanagara rule at Seringapatam. However, the Mysore forces, led by Devaraja Wodeyar I, repulsed the attack and pursued the attackers into the malnad region to the west, where they captured more territory. Devaraja Wodeyar also abrogated his nominal allegiance to Vijayanagar and declared his kingdom to be independent of all connexions. Soon, the Naiks of Madura invaded Mysore as well; they too were repulsed and chased back into their own dominions, where Erode and Dharapuram were annexed to Mysore, and Trichonopoly was forced to pay tribute to Mysore.

Devaraja Wodeyar I died in Chiknayakanhalli on 11 February 1673. At the time of his death, the furthest outposts of the realm had considerably expanded. They extended to present-day Dharapuram in Coimbatore in the south, Sakrepatna in the west, and Salem in the east.

== See also ==
- Political history of Mysore and Coorg (1565–1760)
