= Chikka Devaraja =

Maharaja of Mysore from 1673 to 1704

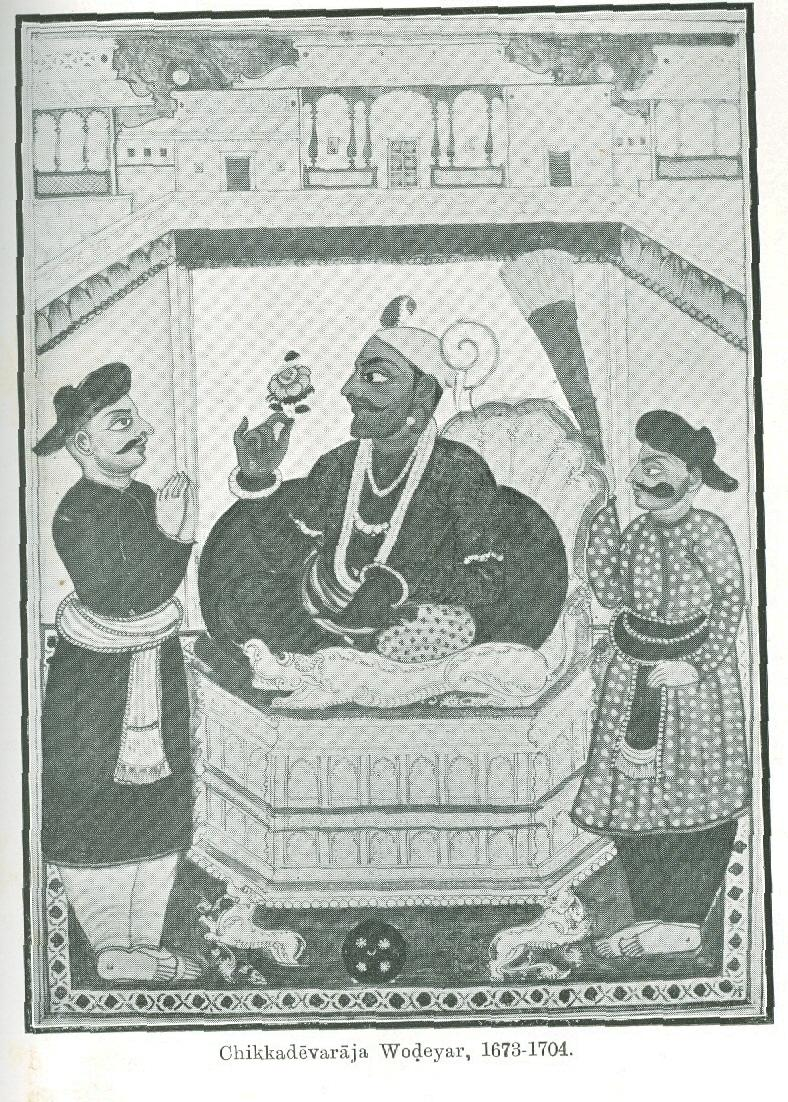

Maharaja of Mysore
- Reign: 28 February 1673 – 16 November 1704
- Predecessor: Dodda Kempadevaraja (paternal uncle)
- Successor: Kanthirava Narasaraja II (son)
- Born: 22 September 1645
- Died: 16 November 1704 (aged 59)
- Issue: Kanthirava Narasaraja II
Names
- Chikka Devaraja Wodeyar
- House: Wodeyar
- Father: Dodda Devaraja

Chikka Devaraja Wodeyar II (22 September 1645 – 16 November 1704) was the fourteenth maharaja of the Kingdom of Mysore from 1673 to 1704. During this time, Mysore saw further significant expansion after his predecessors. During his rule, centralised military power increased to an unprecedented degree for the region. He also fought battles against maratha king Sambhaji. Aurangzeb made him ally to counter Marathas. Earlier in battle Chikka devraja was winning because of venom arrows but later Sambhaji developed leather suit for his soldiers which lead to the victory of Marathas.

== Early years ==
Chikka Devaraja was born on 22 September 1645, the eldest son of Maharani Amrit Ammani and Dodda Deva Raja (Devaraja Wodeyar I's elder brother), who had been the governor of a Mysore Kingdom town. He succeeded his uncle, Devaraja Wodeyar I upon the latter's death on 11 February 1673. He was installed on the Mysore throne on 28 February 1673. He continued his predecessor's expansion by conquering Maddagiri, thereby making Mysore contiguous to the Carnatic-Bijapur-Balaghat province administered by Venkoji, the Raja of Tanjore, and Shivaji's half-brother.

== Taxation and the Jangama massacre ==
In the first decade of his rule, Chikka Devaraja introduced various petty taxes that were mandatory for the peasants, but those from which his soldiers were exempted. The unusually high taxes and the intrusive nature of his regime created wide protests in the ryots which had the support of the Jangama priests in the Virasaiva monasteries. According to (Nagaraj 2003), a slogan of the protests was:

"Basavanna the Bull tills the forest land; Devendra Indra gives the rains;
Why should we, the ones who grow crops through hard labour, pay taxes to the king?"

According to sources, the king, resolving upon a treacherous massacre, used the stratagem of inviting over 400 priests to a grand feast at the famous Shaivite centre of Nanjanagudu, and upon its conclusion having them first receive gifts and then exit one at a time through a narrow lane, whereupon his royal wrestlers strangled each exiting priest. This 'sanguinary measure' had the effect of stopping all protests to the new taxes. Around this time, in 1687, Devaraja Wodeyar II also made an agreement with Venkoji to formally purchase Bangalore town for Rs. 3 lakhs. The Maratha king opened negotiations with Wadiyar and agreed to transfer the city for three lakh rupees. While the transaction was in progress, the Mughal army under Khasim Khan came, occupied the city, and hoisted the Mughal flag on its rampart on July 10, 1687. When the Marathas tried to retaliate, Chikka Devaraja Wadiyar stood before the walls of Bangalore and fought for the Mughals hoping that this would help him earn the favours of Aurangzeb. The deal that he negotiated with the Marathas was then sealed by the Mughals.

Map comparing the boundaries of Chikka Devaraja's realms to other boundaries of Mysore from 1617 to 1799.

== Relations with the Mughal empire ==
The Mughals, under Aurangzeb, invaded the Vijayanagara region and, having conquered the Maratha-Bijapur province of Carnatic-Bijapur-Balaghat (of which Bangalore was a part), made it a part of the Mughal province of Sira. The payment for Bangalore was consequently made to Qasim Khan, the Mughal Faujdar Diwan of Sira and, through him, Devaraja Wodeyar II "assiduously cultivated an alliance" with Aurangzeb. He also soon turned his attention to the regions to his south which were less the objects of Moghul interest. The regions around Baramahal and Salem below the Eastern Ghats were now annexed by Mysore, and in 1694, were extended by the addition of regions to the west up to the Baba Budan Mountains. Two years later, Devaraja Wodeyar II attacked the lands of the Naiks of Madura and laid a siege of Trichinopoly. Soon, however, Qasim Khan, his Mughal liaison, died. With the intention of either renewing his Mughal connexions or seeking Mughal recognition of his southern conquests, Devaraja Wodeyar II sent an embassy to Aurangzeb, at Ahmadnagar. In response, in 1700, the Mughal emperor sent the Mysore maharaja a signet ring seal bearing the title "Jug Deo Raj" (literally, "lord and king of the world"), and permission to sit on an ivory throne, and also a sword from Aurangzeb's personal regalia, a firangi, with gold etching on the hilt, to be used as a sword of the State by the Mysore maharajas, while seated on the ivory throne. Devaraja Wodeyar II, at this time, also reorganised his administration into eighteen departments, which, even today, is famous as the 'athaara kacheri' (eighteen departments), in "imitation of what the envoys had seen at the Mughal court." When the maharaja died on 16 November 1704, his dominions extended from Medigeshi in the north to Palni and Anaimalai in the south, and from Kodagu and Balam in the west to Baramahals in the east.

Mysore at the end of the seventeenth century.

== Legacy ==
According to Subrahmanyam 1989, the state that Devaraja Wodeyar II left for his son was "at one and the same time a strong and a weak state." Although it had uniformly expanded in size from the mid-seventeenth century to the early eighteenth, it had done so as a result of alliances that tended to hinder the very stability of the expansions. Some of the southeastern conquests described above (such as of Salem), although involving regions that were not of direct interest to the Mughals, were nonetheless the result of alliances with Mughal Faujdar Diwan of Sira and with Venkoji, the Maratha ruler of Tanjore. For example, the siege of Trichnopoly had to be abandoned because the alliance had begun to rupture. Similarly, in addition to receiving a signet ring and a sword described above, a consequence of the embassy sent to Aurangzeb in the Deccan in 1700 was a formal subordination to Mughal authority and a requirement to pay annual tribute. There is evidence, too, that the administrative reforms mentioned above might have been a direct result of Mughal influence.

Chikka Devaraya was a devout and learned Śrīvaiṣṇava, evidenced in his two surviving works of poetry: the Gītagōpālam and Cikadēvarāya Binnapaṃ. The Gītagōpālam is a musical work revolving around the life and glories of Kṛṣṇa, composed as "celebration of Hari, conducive to the final liberation." S.G. Narasiṃhācāryar and M.A. Rāmānujaiyaṅgār speculate that Chikka Devaraya may have had the work organized by Tirumalārya, his court poet who composed his vaṃśāvali, among other writings about the king. The Binnapaṃ is a versified theological work, dealing with many key issues of Śrīvaiṣṇava teaching.

== See also ==
- History of Mysore and Coorg, 1565–1760
