= Ekoji's Conquest of Tanjore =

- Part of Madurai- Maratha Conflicts
Date	1674 – 7 February 1675
Location	Thanjavur, India
Result	Thanjavur Marathas victory
Territorial changes	Formation of Thanjavur Maratha Kingdom

Belligerents
Bijapur Sultanate; Thanjavur Marathas	Madurai Nayakas; Thanjavur Nayaks

Commanders and leaders
Ekoji I Rayasam Venkanna	Alagiri Nayak; Chengamal Das

Strength
12,000 Cavalry	Unknown

The Ekoji's Conquest of Tanjore was a conflict between the Maratha forces led by Ekoji I and the supporters of Chengamala Das, the last claimant of the old Nayak line. At first, Ekoji had helped Chengamala Das regain the throne after defeating Alagiri Nayak. But soon disagreements appeared in the court and some ministers became dissatisfied with the new king. One of them Venkanna secretly encouraged Ekoji I to take the kingdom for himself. Taking advantage of the situation Ekoji I marched again toward Thanjavur with his army. Chengamala Das unable to resist the advancing forces fled from the capital. Ekoji then entered the city and took control of the kingdom. The capture of Thanjavur marked the end of the Nayak rule in Tanjore and the beginning of Maratha rule under Ekoji I.

== Background ==
After the fall of Tanjore in 1673 A.D. and the death of Vijayaraghava Nayaka and his son Mannarudas in the battle the kingdom came under the control of Chokkanatha Nayak of Madurai. He appointed his foster-brother Alagiri Nayak as the governor of Tanjore. When Alagiri took charge he quickly restored peace and reorganized the administration of the kingdom. At first he sent the surplus revenue to the court of Madurai as expected. But within a year his ambition grew and he stopped sending the money regularly. In his letters to Chokkanatha Nayak he even began to speak as if he were an equal ruler. Among his officers was Venkanna a Niyogi Brahmin who had earlier served Vijayaraghava Nayak as a secretary. The chronicles say that Venkanna influenced Alagiri Nayak and encouraged his independent attitude. Even so Chokkanatha did not punish Alagiri Nayak because of their close relationship.

Around this time news spread that the old Nayak family of Tanjore had not completely disappeared. A young boy from the royal family had survived the tragedy and was being raised by a merchant at Negapatam. Venkanna who was unhappy with his position under the new rule saw this as an opportunity. He planned to restore the old dynasty and remove Alagiri Nayak from power. With this idea in mind he secretly prepared his plan and travelled to Negapatam to meet the boy and begin his scheme.

=== Bijapur's Assistance ===
Venkanna soon joined Chengamala Das also known as Chengamala Nayak the young member of the old Thanjavur Nayaks royal family who had survived the earlier tragedy. Together they travelled to the court of the Bijapur Sultanate and asked the Sultan for help to restore Chengamala Das to the throne of Tanjore. Venkanna explained that Chengamala Das was the rightful heir and that the kingdom had been taken by Alagiri Nayak. The Sultan believed this claim and decided to support their cause. He ordered an army to march towards Tanjore under his trusted general Ekoji I also known as Vyankoji. Their mission was to defeat Alagiri Nayak remove him from power and place Chengamala Das back on the throne of his ancestors.

== Conquest ==
=== First Conquest ===
==== Capture of Arni and Battle of Ayyampet ====
After receiving the Sultan’s support Ekoji I marched toward Thanjavur with his army. On the way he captured the fort of Arni Fort, strengthening his position before moving further south. When Alagiri Nayak heard about Ekoji’s advance, he asked Chokkanatha Nayak of Madurai for military help. But Chokkanatha remembered Alagiri’s earlier disobedience and refused to assist him. With no outside support, Alagiri Nayak gathered whatever forces he could and marched out to face Ekoji I. The two armies met near Ayyampettai where a fierce battle took place. Alagiri Nayak’s army was defeated and realizing the situation was hopeless he fled toward Mysore through Ariyalur to save his life. Soon after this victory Ekoji I entered Thanjavur and placed Chengamala Das on the throne recognizing him as the rightful ruler of the kingdom.

After Chengamala Das was placed on the throne of Thanjavur he showed great gratitude to Ekoji I for helping him regain the kingdom. According to the native chronicles, Chengamala Das presented many rich gifts and rewards to Ekoji I. It is also said that he revealed the place where a large royal treasure had been hidden. When the treasure was dug out it was believed to contain about twenty-six lakhs of pagodas a huge amount of money at that time. In addition to these gifts Chengamala Das granted Ekoji I the revenues of important districts such as Kumbakonam, Mannargudi and Papanasam to cover the expenses of the military expedition. The chronicles also mention that Ekoji stayed for some time at Kumbakonam.

=== Second Conquest ===
Chengamala Das was proclaimed the ruler of Thanjavur around A.D. 1674. However his rule did not remain peaceful for long because there were disagreements among his own supporters. Following the advice of his foster guardian who had saved him during the tragedy of 1673 and raised him in safety Chengamala Das appointed the Chettiar merchant of Nagapattinam, who had protected him during his exile, as his Pradhani and Dalavay. This decision disappointed Venkanna who had expected to receive those important positions for helping him regain the throne. Feeling ignored and unhappy, Venkanna turned against his king. He went to Ekoji I and encouraged him to take control of Tanjore for himself. With Venkanna’s support Ekoji I marched towards the kingdom again. When Chengamala Das heard about the approaching Maratha army, he fled to Ariyalur to save himself. As a result Thanjavur fell into Ekoji’s hands without much resistance.

== Aftermath ==
After Ekoji I took control of Thanjavur Venkanna was allowed to help restore order in the kingdom. However, Ekoji I did not fully trust him because Venkanna had already betrayed his earlier masters. Venkanna also understood that Ekoji I was suspicious of him and feared that he might be arrested or punished. Because of this fear he quietly left Tanjore and removed himself from the court. With Venkanna gone, Ekoji I was able to take full control and established Thanjavur Maratha kingdom.

== See also ==
- Chokkanatha Nayak
- Vijayaraghava Nayak
- Bijapur Sultanate
