= Siege of Tanjore (1673) =

- Part of Madurai- Tanjore Conflicts
Date	1673
Location	Thanjavur, India
Result	Madurai Nayakas victory
Territorial changes	Thanjavur annexed into madurai kingdom

Belligerents
Madurai Nayakas	Thanjavur Nayaks

Commanders and leaders
Venkata Krishna Nayaka; Chinna Thambi Mudaliar; Chinna Kattiri Nayaka	Vijaya Raghava Nayak †; Venkatadri Nayaka; Mannaru Das †

Strength
Unknown	20,000

The siege of Thanjavur was a conflict between the Madurai army led by Venkata Krishna Nayak, and the Thanjavur army under King Vijaya Raghava Nayak. After a canon bombardment and relentless assault on the Tanjore fort, the Madurai forces broke through the defenses. Vijaya Raghava Nayak died fighting valiantly on the battlefield. The capture of Thanjavur marked the end of the Thanjavur Nayak kingdom, with Madurai emerging victorious and the kingdom falling under the control of Chokkanatha Nayak.

== Background ==
In 1673, Chokkanatha Nayak Sent a marriage proposal to Tanjore king Vijaya Raghava Nayak to marry his daughter to him which was met with rejection. When Chokkanatha's envoys arrived with gifts and a formal request, they were met with harsh insults and humiliation from Vijaya Raghava, who not only dismissed the messengers but also condemned Madurai's monarch in a fit of rage. Stung by the insult and determined to restore his honor, Chokkanatha swiftly decided on military action, instructing his general, Venkata Krishna Nayaka, and the treasurer, Chinna Tambi Mudali, to prepare for war. Venkata Krishna Nayaka, wasted no time in mobilizing the Madurai army. Within days, the Madurai army marched deep into the Tanjore kingdom, where the two armies first fought a battle at Vallam. The battle was marked by such intense bloodshed that it was said that the blood flowed through the irrigation channels like water. the Madurai forces, under Venkata Krishna Nayaka's leadership, emerged victorious. He advanced further to seize the capital Tanjore.

== Siege ==
=== Assault on the fort ===
Venkata Krishna Naik, determined to press his advantage, pursued the retreating Tanjore army and positioned his army at the outskirts of the city, ready for the final confrontation. From his camp, he sent a last offer to King Vijaya Raghava Nayak, extending the possibility of peace if the Tanjore king would agree to the original marriage proposal. However Vijaya Raghava rejected the offer Undeterred by the king's refusal Venkata Krishna Naik gave the order for an immediate and full-scale assault on the Tanjore fort. The fort was a formidable fortress, heavily guarded by a large contingent of 20,000 musketeers but the besieging Madurai army were undaunted. They swiftly constructed raised earthworks to mount their cannons, which were then used to launch an unrelenting bombardment on the fort's walls. The barrage of cannonballs tore through the fortifications, causing severe damage and weakening the defenders. As the walls crumbled and the Tanjore soldiers began to waver, many fled the battlefield, defecting to the army of Madurai. Seizing the moment, Venkata Krishna's forces demolished the fort gates and filled the surrounding ditches with fascines, making it easier for his troops to storm the fort. Some of the soldiers scaled the breaches created by the cannon fire, while others charged through the gates. Within hours, the Madurai forces had overrun the fort, pouring into the city with overwhelming numbers. King Vijaya Raghava, remained deeply engrossed in his religious duties. lost in meditation and prayer to his deity Krishna, he was unaware that the enemy had already entered his city.

=== Death of Vijaya Raghava Nayak ===
After the fall of his city and the losses suffered by his forces, King Vijaya Raghava Nayak of Tanjore refused to surrender to the advancing Madurai army. In a final attempt to avoid further bloodshed, the Madurai general offered peace terms to the Tanjore king but Vijaya Raghava, rejected the offer outright. he led his forces into battle, marching at their head to fight to the bitter end. His son, Mannarudas, who had been confined for his safety, was released and entrusted with a responsibility to safeguard the Zenana quarters, the women's chambers of the palace. In the event of defeat, Mannarudas, along with his trusted ally Akkiraju, was given the task of destroying the Zenana to prevent the royal women from falling into enemy hands. As the battle raged on and the Tanjore army were driven to the brink of collapse, Vijaya Raghava, realizing that defeat was imminent, gave the signal for the destruction of the Zenana. the mines were set fire and all of them were perished. Soon after, both father and son rushed into the battle, fighting valiantly both were slain in the battle.

== Aftermath ==
Following his victory at Tanjore, Venkata Krishna Nayaka, the Dalavay of Madurai, returned triumphantly to Trichinopoly leaving a garrison behind to secure the newly conquered territory. With the fall of their king, Tanjore was fully subdued, and Chokkanatha Nayak, the ruler of Madurai, claimed the kingdom as his own. He appointed his foster-brother, Alagiri Nayak, as the Viceroy to govern Tanjore, consolidating Madurai's control over the region. This marked the end of the Thanjavur Nayaks.

== See also ==
- Vijaya Raghava Nayak
- Chokkanatha Nayak
- Thanjavur Nayaks
