= Chinna Thambi Mudaliar =

17th-century treasurer of the Madurai army

Treasurer of The Madurai Nayakas
- Monarch: Chokkanatha Nayak

Personal details
- Occupation: Treasurer; Diplomat

Military service
- Allegiance: Madurai Nayakas
- Branch/service: Madurai Army
- Battles/wars: Siege of Tanjore (1673)

Chinna Thambi Mudaliar was the treasurer of the Madurai army during the reign of Chokkanatha Nayak. He played a key role alongside General Venkata Krishna Nayaka in the military campaigns, including the Siege of Tanjore (1673). Trusted by the king, he managed the army's finances and resources during these expeditions. Chinna Thambi Mudaliar also acted as a diplomat participating in the unsuccessful marriage proposal to Vijaya Raghava Nayak of Tanjore, which ultimately led to the conflict. He was later honored with significant donatives for his service to the Madurai Nayakas Kingdom.

== Career ==
Chinna Thambi Mudaliar served as the treasurer of the Madurai army and accompanied General Venkata Krishna Nayaka during the military campaigns under Chokkanatha Nayak. Entrusted with managing the army's finances and logistics, he played a crucial role in ensuring the execution of the Tanjore campaign.

=== Siege of Tanjore (1673) ===
General Venkata Krishna Nayaka and Chinna Thambi Mudaliar under the orders of Chokkanatha Nayak of Madurai Invaded Tanjore. The conflict was Sparked by Tanjore. Vijaya Raghava Nayak the ruler of Tanjore, had a daughter celebrated for her beauty and qualities that caught the attention of Venkata Krishna Nayaka the general of Chokkanatha Nayak and Chinna Tambi Mudaliar, the treasurer of the Madurai army. They deemed her a suitable match for their king, Chokkanatha Nayak and sought his approval to initiate a marriage proposal. With the king's consent, a delegation was sent to Tanjore to negotiate the union.

However Vijaya Raghava Nayak upon receiving the proposal, was outraged and refused, expressing his disdain with sharp words and dismissing the messengers without due respect. The insulted delegation returned to Trichinopoly and reported the incident to Venkata Krishna Nayaka, Chinna Tambi Mudaliar, and Chokkanatha Nayak. Enraged by the affront, Chokkanatha Nayak immediately mobilized a large army, assembling elephants, horses, infantry, cannons, and weapons for an assault on Tanjore. He commanded Venkata Krishna Nayaka to lead the forces, capture the fort of Tanjore subdue the kingdom, and bring it under his control as retribution for the insult. Madurai’s army advanced on Tanjore, engaging in a bloody confrontation. Despite Tanjore’s well-fortified defenses, including 20,000 musketeers and powerful artillery, the Madurai forces relentlessly attacked, breaching the fort with cannon fire and earthworks. The Tanjore army suffered heavy losses, and the fort was stormed. Vijaya Raghava Nayak along with his sons, was killed during the assault. Following the victory, Chokkanatha appointed his foster brother, Alagiri Nayak as viceroy of Tanjore, consolidating Madurai’s power in the region.

Chokkanatha Nayak following his successful conquest of Tanjore had numerous donatives and rewards distributed through his trusted treasurer, Chinna-Tambi Mudaliar.

== See also ==
- Chokkanatha Nayak
- Vijaya Raghava Nayak
- Venkata Krishna Nayaka
