= Venkata Krishna Nayaka =

Indian military general

Savyasachin Sangora Kirita (Crown of Battle) Venkata Krishna Nayaka

General of The Madurai Nayakas
- Monarch: Chokkanatha Nayak

Personal details
- Occupation: Military

Military service
- Allegiance: Madurai Nayakas
- Branch/service: Madurai Army
- Years of service: 1667–1673
- Battles/wars: See list: Madurai–Mysore Wars; Siege of Tanjore (1673)

Venkata Krishna Nayaka was a prominent military general under Chokkanatha Nayaka, the ruler of Madurai. he played a key role in several battles against Mysore Kingdom in the Madurai–Mysore Wars and Thanjavur Nayaks particularly in the Siege of Tanjore (1673). Venkata Krishna was instrumental in leading the Madurai forces to victory in the confrontation with the Tanjore kingdom, displaying courage and tactical skill. His title, "Sangora Kirita" (Crown of Battle), was a reflection of his valor and success on the battlefield. His leadership in the siege and capture of the Tanjore fort marked a significant military achievement further strengthening Chokkanatha Nayak’s rule.

== Military career ==
=== Battle of Maduvana ===
During the reign of Chikkadevaraja Wodeyar of Mysore, a fierce struggle for supremacy over Karnataka unfolded between Mysore Kingdom, Madurai Nayakas, and Nayakas of Ikkeri. Early in his rule, Chikkadevaraja engaged in significant battles with the Nayaks of Madurai and Ikkeri both of whom sought to check Mysore's growing power. Mallikarjuna, the court poet, records that Chokkanatha, the ruler of Madura, harbored hostility toward Mysore and actively prepared for war. This enmity stemmed from the defeat Chokkanatha Nayak suffered at Erode in 1667 during the reign of Dodda Kempadevaraja which left him determined to avenge his humiliation.

After the death of Dodda Kempadevaraja Chokkanatha Nayak of Madurai sought to exploit the situation by reorganizing his army and planning an invasion of Mysore. Chokkanatha Nayak in alliance with Nayakas of Ikkeri aimed to destabilize Mysore’s power under Chikkadevaraja Wodeyar. While Madurai incited rebellion in the south, Ikkeri launched an invasion from the north. Chokkanatha dispatched his commander, Venkata Krishana Nayaka, who held the title "Sangora Kirita" (Crown of Battle), to lead the attack. Chikkadevaraja Wodeyar however, was no stranger to such threats. As crown prince, he had previously defeated a powerful confederacy formed by Chokkanatha Nayak and Sriranga III of Vijayanagara, defeating them decisively at Erode in 1667.

The Mysore forces attacked the Madurai army at Maduvana. In a fierce and decisive battle, Chikkadevaraja Wodeyar inflicted a defeat on the Nayak of Madurai. The Madurai army suffered heavy losses in men and ammunition, while the Mysoreans captured valuable spoils on the battlefield, including war horses, elephants, and other belongings of the defeated army.

=== Battle of Vallam ===
In 1674, Chokkanatha Nayak of Madura sought the hand of the renowned and virtuous daughter of Vijaya Raghava Nayak, the king of Tanjore in marriage. An embassy was sent to Tanjore accompanied by gifts and formal proposals. However, the request deeply offended the Tanjore king, who considered the proposal an affront to his dignity. With open disdain he rejected the proposal declaring Chokkanatha Nayak unworthy of being his son-in-law. The Madurai emissaries were subjected to harsh insults and dismissed.

Outraged by the insult from the Tanjore king, Chokkanatha Nayak of Madurai resolved to wage war and commanded his general, Venkata Krishna Nayak, along with the treasurer Chinna Tambi Mudali, to mobilize the Madurai army. Venkata Krishna, a highly skilled and celebrated commander honored with titles such as "Sugriva’s Crown" and "Savyasachin," swiftly responded to the call. Within days, the Madurai forces reached the borders of the Tanjore Nayak kingdom. A fierce battle ensued, marked by heavy casualties, where "blood ran like water in the channels for irrigation." Despite the intense resistance, the Madurai army emerged victorious, breaking through the Tanjore defenses and advancing into their territory.

=== Siege of Tanjore ===
Venkata Krishna Nayak relentlessly pursued the retreating Tanjore forces and established his camp near Tanjore. He sent a message to King Vijaya Raghava Nayak, offering to withdraw if the king agreed to the marriage proposal. However Vijaya Raghava Nayak responded with a defiant challenge to battle. Undeterred, Venkata Krishna ordered an all-out assault on the well-fortified Tanjore fort, which was defended by 20,000 musketeers and a sizable army. The Madurai forces mounted their cannons on raised earthworks and unleashed tens of thousands of cannon shots, inflicting severe damage. Unable to withstand the bombardment, many of the defenders deserted, fleeing to Trichinopoly. The gates of the fort were demolished, and the ditches were filled with fascines. The Madurai forces stormed the fort, breaching its walls and entering through gates.

After capturing the city, Venkata Krishna Nayaka sent a second message of friendship and caution to Vijaya Raghava Nayak the King of Tanjore. However, the monarch, engrossed in the worship of his deity, remained completely unaware of the catastrophic events unfolding outside. Devoted to his religious rituals and meditations, he ignored the urgent threat posed by the enemy forces. In his steadfast imitation of Krishna the Lord of the Gopis, Vijaya Raghava's inaction allowed the Madurai forces to press their advantage.

Facing inevitable defeat and unwilling to endure the dishonor of captivity, King Vijaya Raghava Nayak of Tanjore chose a valiant end. Accompanied by his three sons, 18 loyal horsemen, and his beloved queen seated behind him, he rode out to confront the enemy. As the enemy forces loomed near, the queen, overcome with fear and despair, pleaded with her husband to end her life, preferring death at his hands to falling into enemy control. Though reluctant, the king, moved by her determined pleas, finally complied. With a heavy heart, he unsheathed his sword and ended her life. With his blade crimson, the king charged fearlessly into the enemy ranks alongside his companions, where he fought valiantly before meeting his end in battle.

Following the decisive defeat and annihilation of the Tanjore army, Dalavai Venkata Krishna Nayaka ensured control over the conquered territory by placing a new garrison in the Tanjore fort. As a symbol of victory, he returned to Madurai with the severed heads of Vijaya Raghava Nayak and Mannarudas. Chokkanatha Nayak the ruler of Madurai, was immensely pleased with this triumph. With the entire Tanjore Nayaka Kingdom now under his control, Chokkanatha solidified his hold over the region by appointing his trusted foster-brother, Alagiri Nayak as the viceroy of Tanjore in 1674, ensuring the stability and administration of the newly acquired territory.

== See also ==
- Chokkanatha Nayak
- Chikkadevaraja Wodeyar
- Madurai Nayakas
