= Madurai Invasion of Tanjore (1663) =

- Part of Madurai-Thanjavur Conflicts
Date	1663
Location	Tamilnadu, India
Result	Madurai victory
Territorial changes	Vallam Captured by Chokkanatha Nayak

Belligerents
Madurai Nayakas	Thanjavur Nayaks

Commanders and leaders
Chokkanatha Nayak	Vijaya Raghava Nayak

The Madurai invasion of Thanjavur in 1663 was a military campaign initiated by Chokkanatha Nayak of Madurai against Vijaya Raghava Nayak of Thanjavur. The invasion was undertaken in retaliation for Thanjavur Kingdom's support of the Bijapur invasion of Madurai earlier that year. Chokkanatha Nayak captured the important fort of Vallam and compelled Vijaya Raghava Nayak to negotiate peace. Vallam was later recovered by Vijaya Raghava Nayak.

== Background ==
Following the Bijapur invasion of 1663, during which the Bijapur commander Vanamiyan besieged Trichinopoly but failed to capture the city he devastated the surrounding countryside and demanded payment in exchange for withdrawing from the Madurai kingdom. Chokkanatha Nayak agreed to pay the demanded sum securing the Bijapur army's withdrawal. Seeking revenge against Vijaya Raghava Nayak of Thanjavur, who had supported Vanamiyan by providing troops and supplies during the campaign Chokkanatha Nayak launched an invasion of the Thanjavur kingdom later in 1663.

== Invasion ==
In 1663, Chokkanatha Nayak invaded the Thanjavur kingdom with a large army and soon captured the fort of Vallam despite its strong garrison and the fertile lands under its control. Following the loss of the fort, Vijaya Raghava Nayak agreed to negotiate peace and accepted the terms imposed by Chokkanatha Nayak. As a result Vallam which had originally belonged to the Madurai kingdom before being transferred to Thanjavur Nayaks by Achyuta Deva Raya in exchange for Trichinopoly at the beginning of Nayak rule in Thanjavur was restored to Madurai. Jesuit sources confirm Chokkanatha's conquest, noting that he left a strong garrison at Vallam before returning to his kingdom.

The war between the Madurai and Thanjavur Nayak kingdoms is also documented in contemporary Dutch Letters which records the events of the campaign:-

"the Nayak of Madura had been for a considerable time in war with the Nayak of Tanjore and taken many places from him; at my time the war was renewed with more vigour than ever; and the Nayak of Tanjore having gathered a great army attacked the Nayak of Madura so briskly that he took from him, in a few days, all the places he had conquered from him before. The army of the Nayak of Madura being much disheartened by the victories of their enemies, the Nayak of Madura sent to me to Koylang his chief governor desiring assistance from the Company ; but as it was not our interest to engage on any side, I excused it as handsomely as I could.”

== Aftermath ==
In 1664 Vijaya Raghava Nayak recaptured the fort of Vallam, Chokkanatha Nayak held it only for one year. At the time, Chokkanatha Nayak was occupied with reorganizing the administration of the Sethupathis of Ramnad and preparing for a campaign against Kingdom of Mysore. As he was also unable to secure Dutch support he appears to have allowed Vijaya Raghava Nayak to reoccupy Vallam without offering any resistance.

== See also ==
- Nayaka dynasties
- Gingee Nayaks
- Thanjavur
