= Siege of Trichinopoly (1663) =

- Part of Madurai–Bijapur Conflicts
| Date | 1663 |
| Location | Trichinopoly, Tamil Nadu, India 10.7905°N 78.7047°E |

Belligerents
| Madurai Nayakas | Bijapur Sultanate; Supported by: Thanjavur Nayaks |

Commanders and leaders
| Chokkanatha Nayak | Vanamian; Vijaya Raghava Nayak |

Casualties and losses
| Heavy | Heavy |
- Location within South Asia

The Siege of Trichinopoly (1663) was a military conflict between the Madurai Nayakas kingdom under Chokkanatha Nayak and the Bijapur Sultanate. The Bijapur army commanded by Vanamian besieged Trichinopoly but was unable to capture the city. After lifting the siege the invaders ravaged parts of the Madurai kingdom before withdrawing in return for a large payment from Chokkanatha Nayak.

== Background ==
Shortly after his accession to the throne in 1662, Chokkanatha Nayak faced an invasion by a Bijapur army commanded by Shahaji and supported by Lingama Nayaka a former Madurai general who had defected to Bijapur. The Bijapur forces besieged Trichinopoly but Chokkanatha successfully repelled the invasion and pursued the retreating army as far as Thanjavur. Shahaji and Lingama Nayaka then retreated to Gingee, while Vijaya Raghava Nayak of Thanjavur surrendered to Chokkanatha Nayak.

In early 1663, the Bijapur army launched another campaign into South India. The exact reason for the invasion is unclear although it may have been an attempt to recover from its previous setback in the region.

== Siege ==
The invasion was led by Vanamian the commander-in-chief of Bijapur. During his advance toward Trichinopoly Vanamian encountered little resistance from Vijaya Raghava Nayak of Thanjavur, who followed his established policy of submitting to and assisting the Bijapur forces. At Trichinopoly however, the Bijapur army faced stronger resistance than expected. Chokkanatha Nayak's artillery effectively countered the besieging forces the heavy losses suffered by Bijapur Army convincing Vanamian that the city could not be captured easily. He subsequently abandoned the siege and redirected his campaign into the interior of the Madurai Nayakas kingdom adopting a strategy of devastating the countryside to pressure Chokkanatha Nayak into submission.

The Bijapur Army devastated the suburbs of Tiruchirappalli destroying crops, burning villages, and subjecting many inhabitants to violence and enslavement. The widespread destruction led some civilians to take their own lives in groups, including by gathering inside houses and setting them on fire.

== Aftermath ==
After extensively plundering the kingdom, Vanamian agreed to withdraw the Bijapur army after Chokkanatha Nayak paid a large sum of money. With the invasion brought to an end Chokkanatha Nayak turned his attention to Vijaya Raghava Nayak of Thanjavur launching a campaign against him in retaliation for his cooperation with the Bijapur Army.

== See also ==
- Shivaji I
- Gingee Nayaks
- Vellore Fort
