= Large-calibre artillery =

Weapons with a calibre of 75mm or more

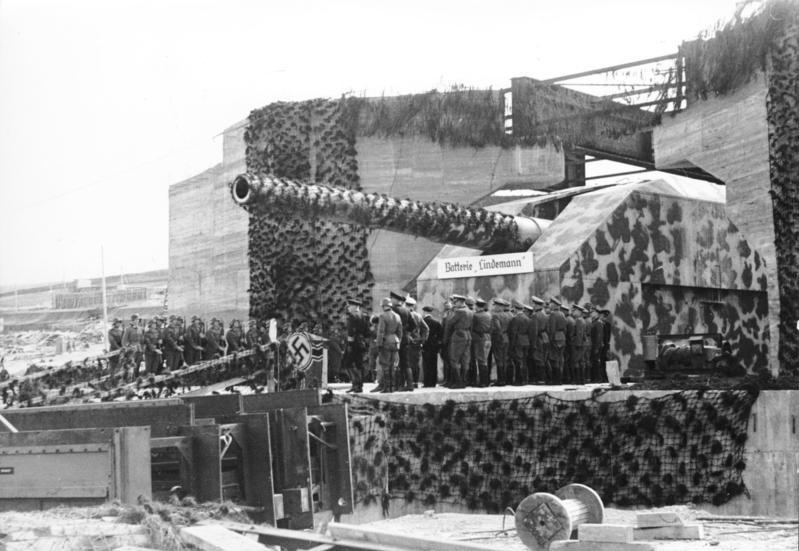
Adolf Gun, a Nazi German cross-channel firing gun

The formal definition of large-calibre artillery used by the United Nations Register of Conventional Arms (UNROCA) is "guns, howitzers, artillery pieces, combining the characteristics of a gun, howitzer, mortar, or rocket, capable of engaging surface targets by delivering primarily indirect fire, with a calibre of 76.2 mm (3.00 in) and above". This definition, shared by the Arms Trade Treaty and the Treaty on Conventional Armed Forces in Europe, is updated from an earlier definition in United Nations General Assembly Resolution 46/36L, which set a threshold of 100 mm (3.9 in). The threshold was lowered in 2003 to yield the current definition, as endorsed by UN General Assembly Resolution 58/54.

Historically, large-calibre weapons have included bombards and siege guns.

== Late Middle Ages ==
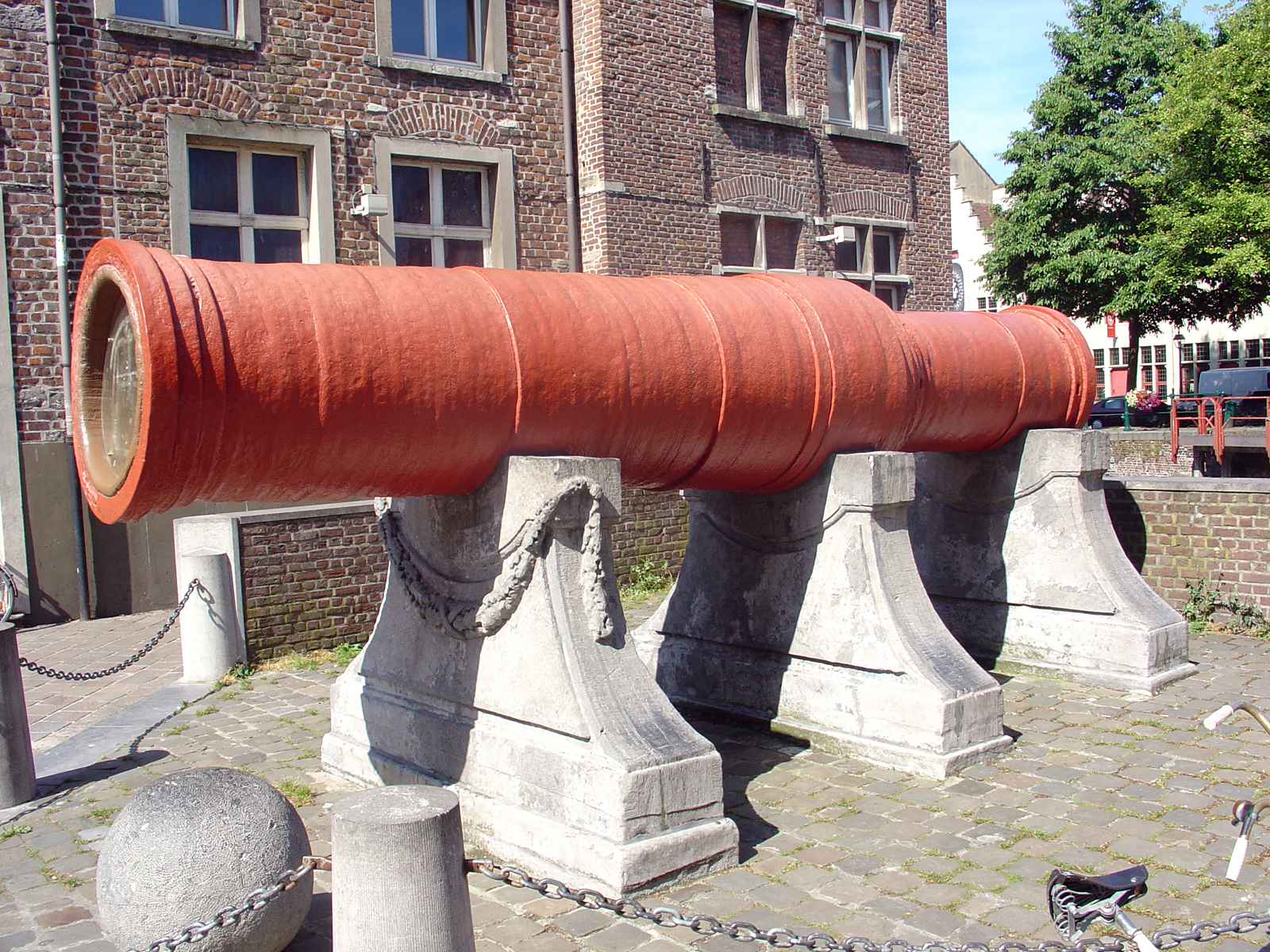
Flemish Dulle Griet

In the context of late medieval siege warfare the term superguns applies to stone-firing bombards with a ball diameter of more than 50 cm (20 in). These superguns were either manufactured by forging together longitudinal iron bars, held in place by iron rings, or cast in bronze with techniques generally similar to bell-founding. Known examples include the Pumhart von Steyr, Dulle Griet and Mons Meg (all iron) as well as the cast-bronze Faule Mette, Faule Grete and Dardanelles Gun.

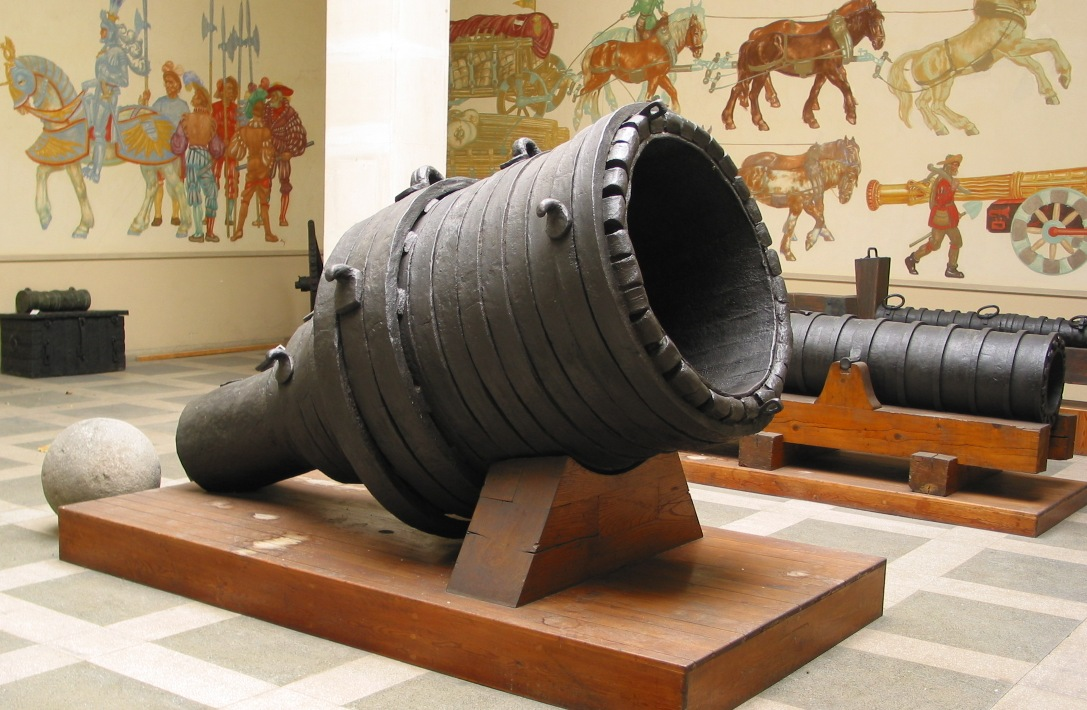
Austrian Pumhart von Steyr

At the beginning of the development of superguns was the desire to increase the effect of the projectiles. To this end, master gunners first simply used larger powder loads. These, however, exerted larger pressure on the existing cannon and could make it burst, causing the death of the irreplaceable gunner with his crew (and even kings). In addition, it was observed that, due to their higher velocity, stone balls were shattered by the impact on the walls rather than smashing them. Thus, the mass of the cannonballs and, consequently, of the ordnance too continually increased, finally culminating in giant cannon like the Pumhart von Steyr which fired a 690 kg (1,520 lb) ball. Apart from the anticipated improvement in penetrating power, other factors such as prestige and a potential deterrent effect also played an important role.

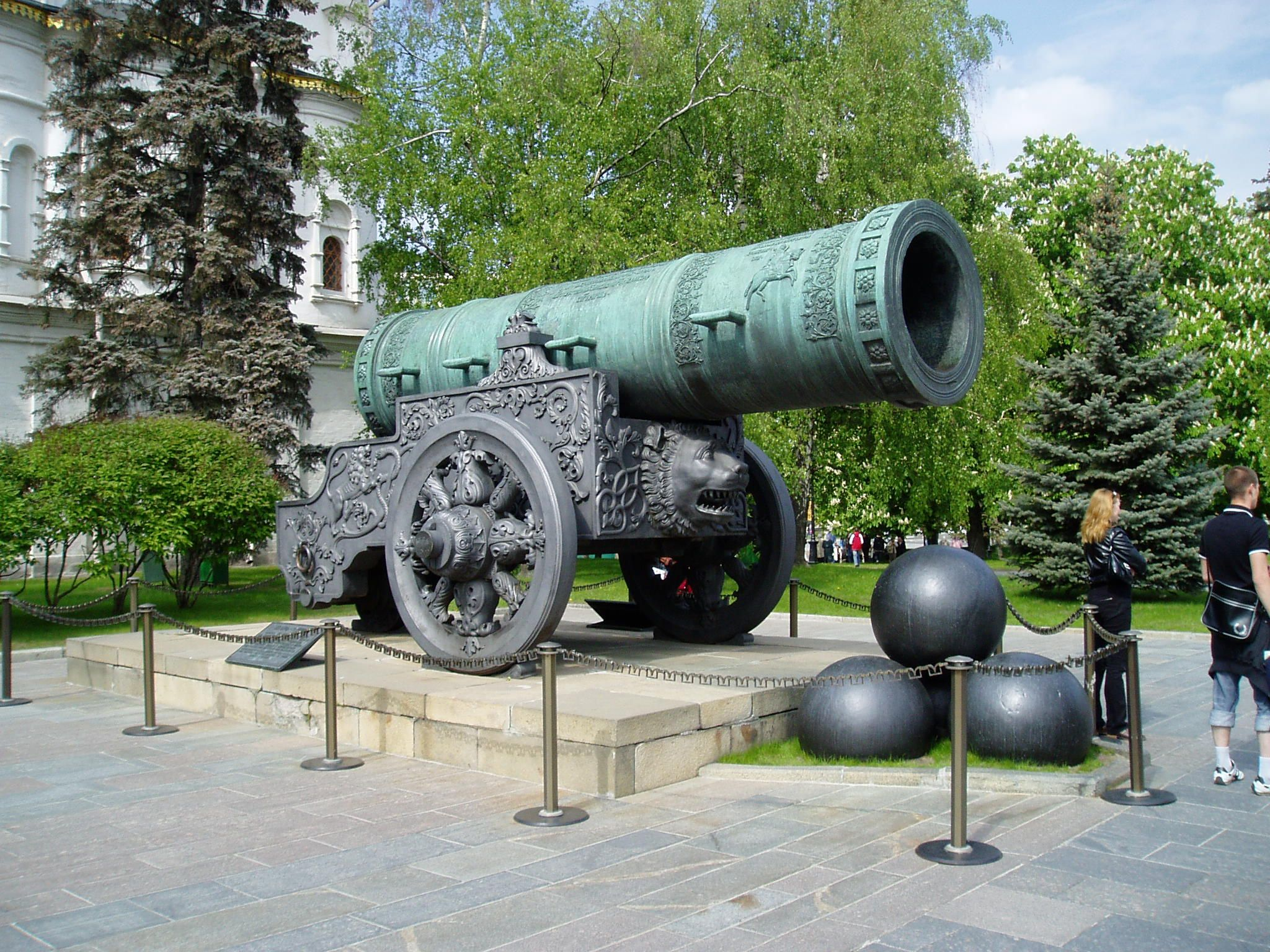
Russian Tsar Cannon

For all their manufacturing quality the superguns were only moderately successful. Their military effectiveness turned out to be out of all proportion to their overwhelming logistical demands and financial costs. For the cost of a single supergun, two or three large bombards with a reasonably smaller caliber (in German Hauptbüchse) could be produced whose firepower was enough to shatter any medieval wall, in particular when it was concentrated in a battery. Due to their less bulky dimensions and higher rate of fire, these artillery pieces could be more flexibly deployed and caused more destruction in any given length of time. Furthermore, the transition from stone to smaller, but much more devastating iron balls meant that super-sized bores became unnecessary. The caliber of a 23 kg (50 lb) ball, for example, could be reduced from 28 to 18 cm (11.0 to 7.1 in) when using an iron projectile instead.

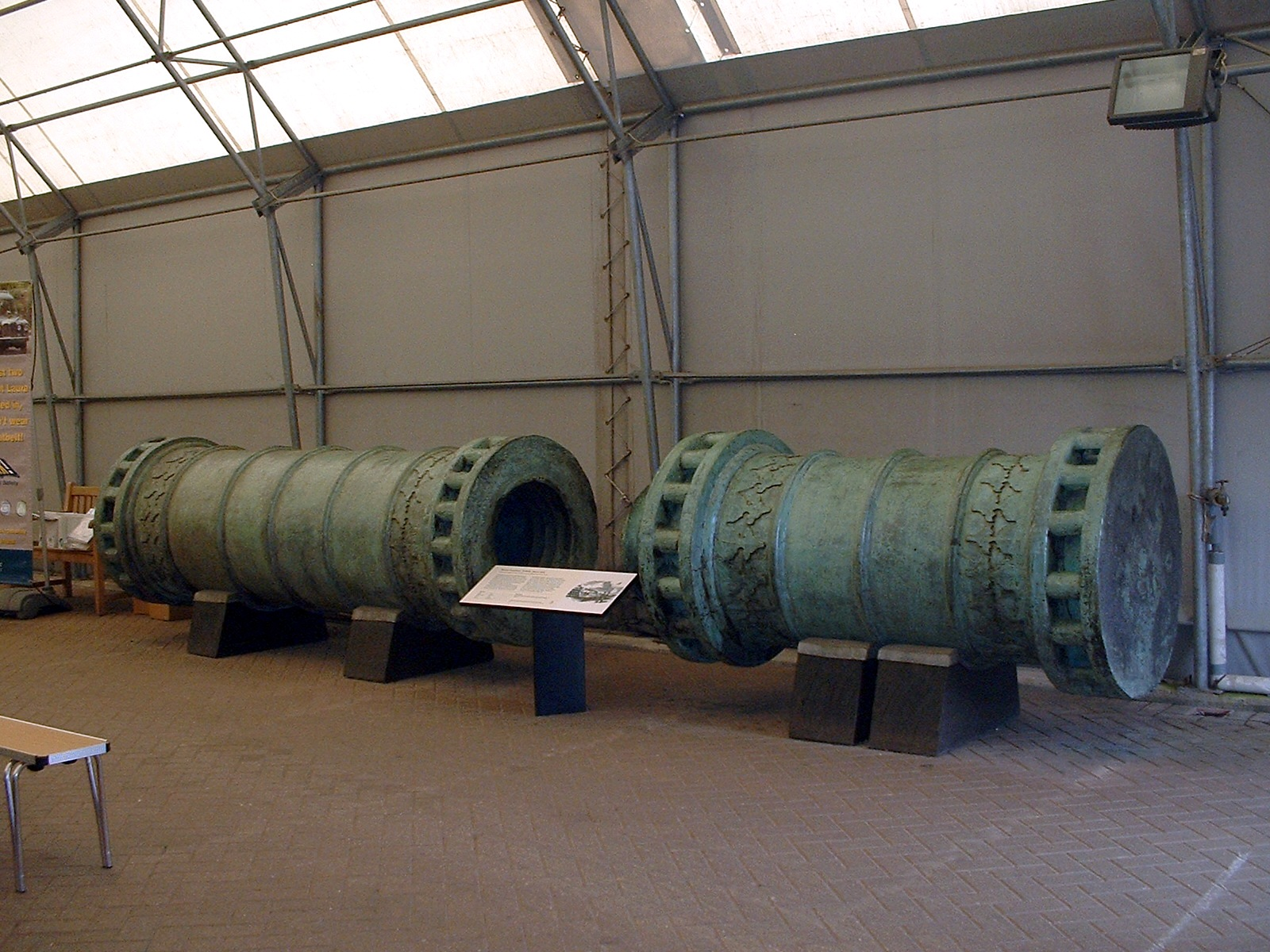
Ottoman Dardanelles Gun

Thus, as early as the second half of the 15th century, further development in siege technology concentrated on the Hauptbüchse, and bombards largely disappeared from the leading artillery arsenal of the dukes of Burgundy.

At about the same time super-sized bombards were phased out in Western Europe, the technology was transmitted to the Ottoman army by one Orban, a Hungarian gunfounder, on the occasion of the Siege of Constantinople in 1453. The extant Dardanelles Gun, cast by the Ottoman gunfounder Ali several years later, is assumed to have followed closely the outline of Orban's guns. A similar super-sized bombard was employed by the Ottoman navy aboard a carrack of possibly Venetian design at the Battle of Zonchio in 1499.

Later still, large-calibre artillery would appear in India, such as the Malik-E-Maidan cannon cast of bell metal bronze in 1549 during the reign of Ali Adil Shah I, or the Thanjavur cannon built of forge-welded iron during the reign of Raghunatha Nayak (1600–1645). Both artillery pieces were among the largest cannons in the world when they were constructed, and today are some of the largest surviving stone-firing cannons. Artillery was used by Indian armies predominantly for defending against besieging armies.

== Modern weapons ==
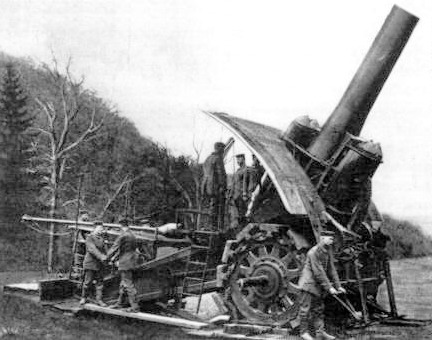
German Big Bertha howitzer

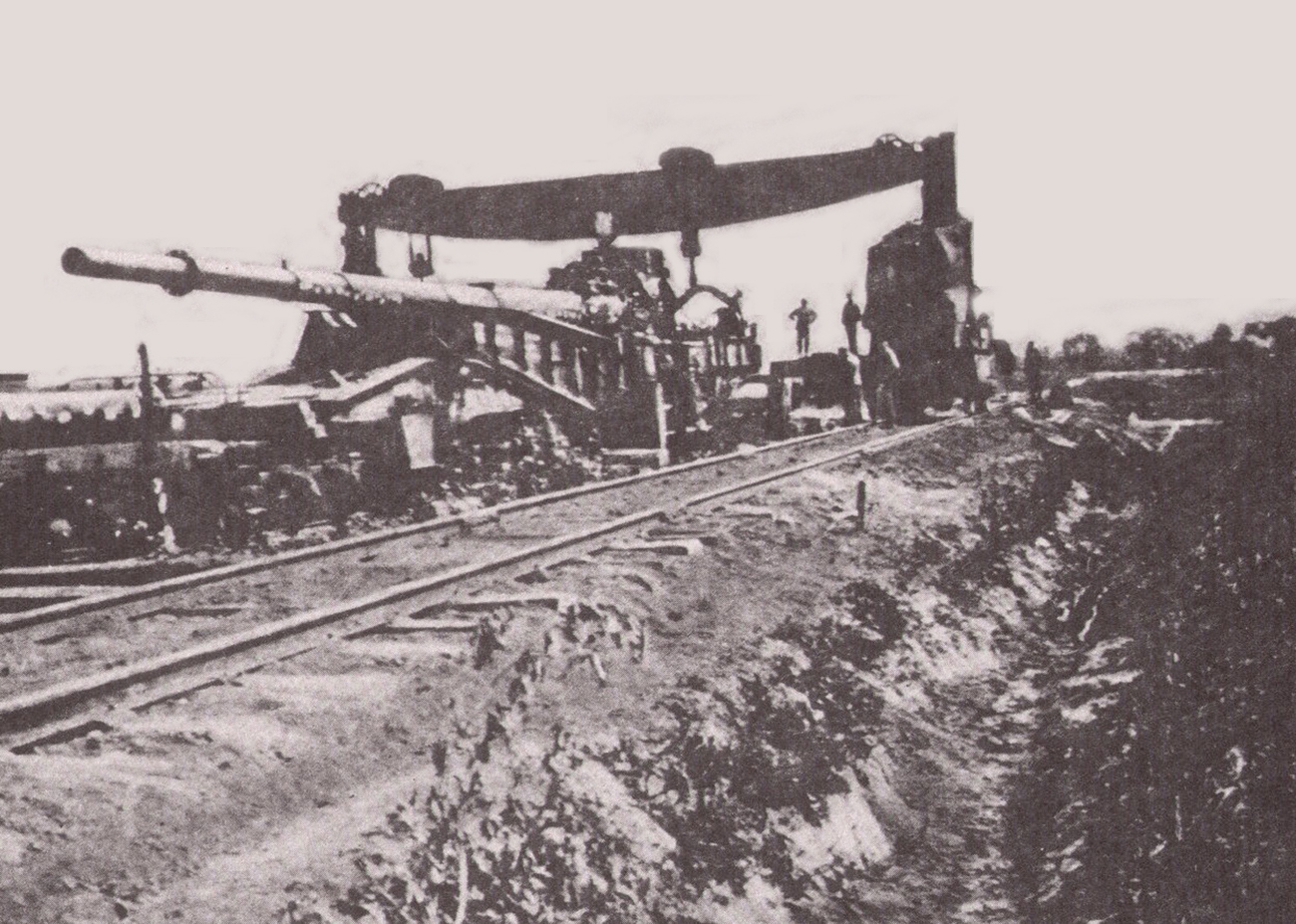
The Paris Gun being assembled

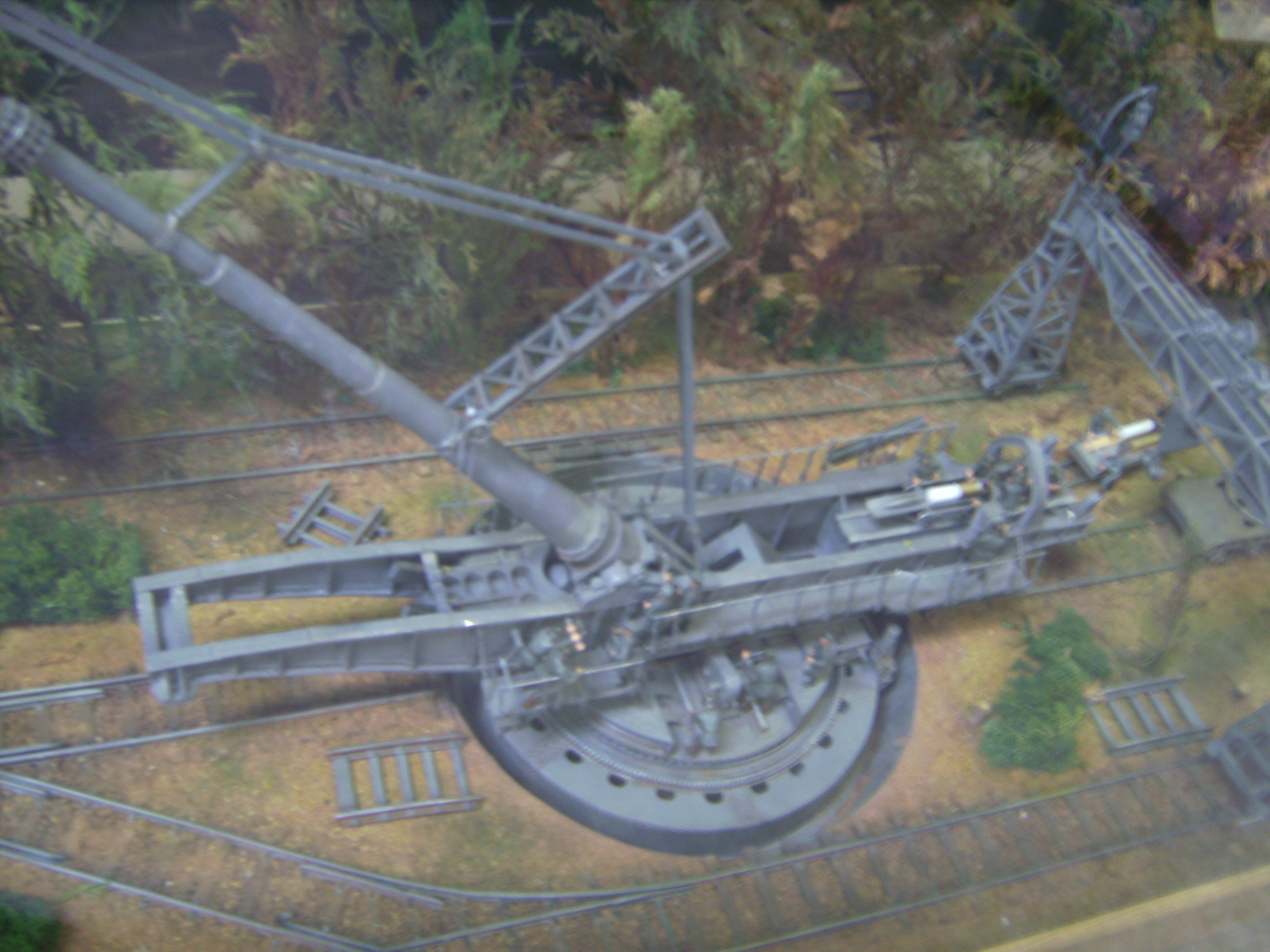
Model of the Paris Gun on fixed mounting.

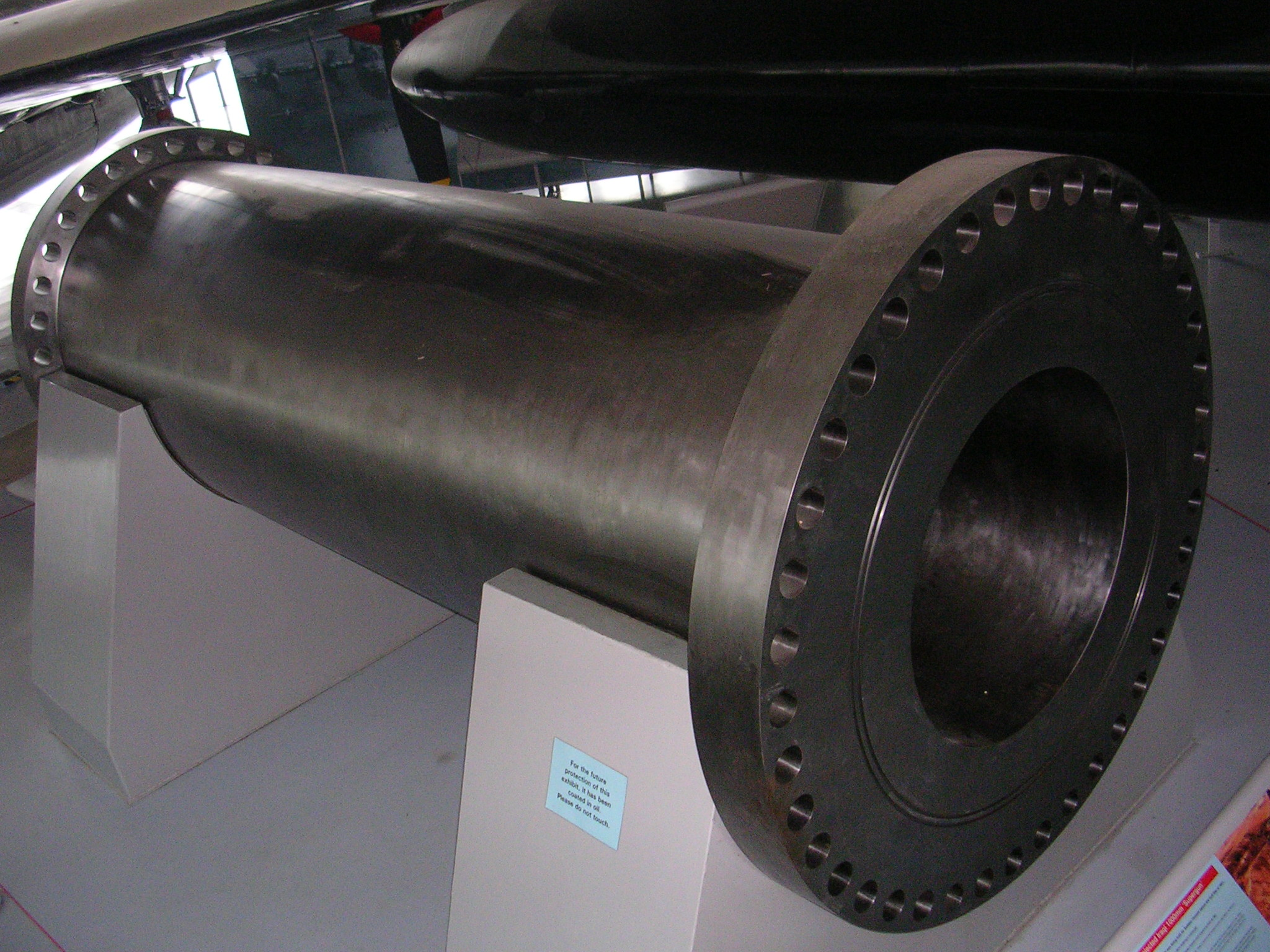
A section of the Iraqi supergun from Imperial War Museum Duxford

With the new metallurgical methods and precision engineering of the Industrial Revolution, a revolution in armaments, including artillery took place. In the 1860s, the industrialist Sir William Armstrong, who had already built one of the first breech-loading rifled artillery pieces, constructed a 270-kilogram (600 lb) 'monster gun' of then extraordinary size at the Elswick Ordnance Company in Newcastle. The gun was a rifled muzzle-loader of 22,000 kg (49,000 lb) that fired shells of up to 270 kg (600 lb) and could pierce 11 cm (4.5 in) of iron armour. Armstrong identified them as "shunt" guns, but they were soon popularly known as "monster" guns.

By the 1880s he had built guns of over 12 metres (40 ft) in length that could fire 820-kilogram (1,800 lb) shells and punch through 76 cm (30 in) of iron at a range of 13 kilometres (8 mi). The gun was exhibited at the Royal Mining Engineering Jubilee Exhibition held at Newcastle in 1887 for Queen Victoria's golden jubilee.

Prior to World War I, the German military was especially interested in the development of superweapons due to the need for the Schlieffen plan to march past a line of Belgian fortifications constructed specifically to stop such an invasion route. During the opening phases of the war, the Germans employed a 420 mm (17 in) Krupp howitzer (the Big Bertha) and two 305 mm (12.0 in) Skoda Mörser M. 11 mortars to reduce the famous fortresses of Liège and Namur. Their low overland mobility made them arrive later than the infantry at Liège, so several infantry assaults were made with heavy loss of life and generally little success. The guns arrived a few days later and reduced the forts at Liège one-by-one over a short period of a few days.

Larger artillery after this opening period was generally limited to railway guns, which had much greater mobility, or naval monitors (two of the British Lord Clive class monitors were fitted with a 460 mm (18 in) gun, and HMS General Wolfe fired 33 km (21 mi) at a railway bridge in Belgium). All of the major powers involved employed such weapons in limited numbers, typically between 280 and 305 mm (11.0 and 12.0 in) although some larger weapons were also used.

The longest-ranged and longest-barreled of the heavy guns deployed in World War I was the Paris Gun, which was used to bombard Paris from a distance of over 130 kilometres (81 mi). The gun had a bore diameter of 211 mm (8.3 in) and a barrel length of 34 metres (112 ft). It was fired from concealed fixed positions in the forest of Coucy.

The British attempted to develop weapons to counter the Paris Gun, but none was ready for testing until after the Armistice. A 410 mm (16 in) gun under development by Vickers for a class of never-built Russian battleships was converted and lined down to 205 mm (8.1 in), with the designation "8-inch sub-calibre Mark I". The barrel was 120 calibres long. Testing commenced in February 1919, but after only six rounds were fired a crack was discovered, and the gun was scrapped in 1928. A weapon of similar concept, the "8-inch sub-calibre Mark II", was converted from a 300 mm (12 in) gun (either Mark XI, XI*, or XII), producing a 205 mm (8.1 in)/75 calibre weapon. However, with the war ending before the gun was ready, this weapon was soon scrapped.

Development continued during the inter-war era, although at a more limited pace as aircraft were expected to take over in the long-range bombardment role. Nevertheless, the Germans built a handful of powerful Krupp K5s and the largest artillery pieces (by caliber) ever used in combat: the 800 mm (31 in) Schwerer Gustav and Dora. The latter had been designed specifically to defeat the Maginot Line, firing a 7,000 kg (15,000 lb) shell to a range of 37 km (23 mi). Although their original role proved unnecessary, Gustav was used successfully to destroy Soviet heavy fortifications, most notably those at Sevastopol. Dora was readied for combat at Stalingrad, but was withdrawn before it could be used. Development might have continued but for the ever-increasing Allied air power, which limited Hitler's options in terms of re-opening bombing attacks on London. This led to the development of the V-3 "London Gun" or "Hochdruckpumpe", fired from Mimoyecques in the Pas de Calais, about 153 kilometres (95 mi) away. Two attempts to build underground bunkers for the huge weapons were thwarted by massive Royal Air Force bombing raids, which made further attempts futile. Two smaller prototype versions of the gun were used during the Battle of the Bulge.

During World War II, the British developed an experimental 13.5/8 inch hypervelocity gun named Bruce, which was deployed near St Margaret's in Kent among their cross-Channel guns. It was intended only for stratospheric experiments, primarily with smoke shells. These experiments were important in the development of the Grand Slam bomb. It was used from March 1943 through February 1945.

== The "Supergun Affair" ==
Canadian engineer Gerald Bull became interested in the possibility of using 'superguns' in place of rockets to insert payloads into orbit. He lobbied for the start of Project HARP to investigate this concept in the 1960s, using paired ex-US Navy 406 mm (16 in)/50 caliber Mark 7 gun barrels welded end-to-end. Three of these guns were emplaced, one in Quebec, Canada, another in Barbados, and the third near Yuma, Arizona. HARP was later cancelled, and Bull turned to military designs, eventually developing the GC-45 howitzer. Some years later, Bull interested Saddam Hussein in funding Project Babylon. The objective of this project is not certain, but one possibility is that it was intended to develop a gun capable of firing an object into orbit, whence it could then drop onto any place on the Earth. Gerald Bull was assassinated in March 1990, terminating development, and the parts were confiscated by British customs after the Gulf War.

It has been suggested that the US Navy had developed a supergun (actually a prototype railgun, known as the Electro-Magnetic Laboratory Rail Gun), capable of shooting shells at 9,000 km/h (5,600 mph) or Mach 7.

== See also ==
- Railgun
- List of artillery
- List of the largest cannon by caliber
- Super High Altitude Research Project
