= Egowriamman Temple, Vallam =

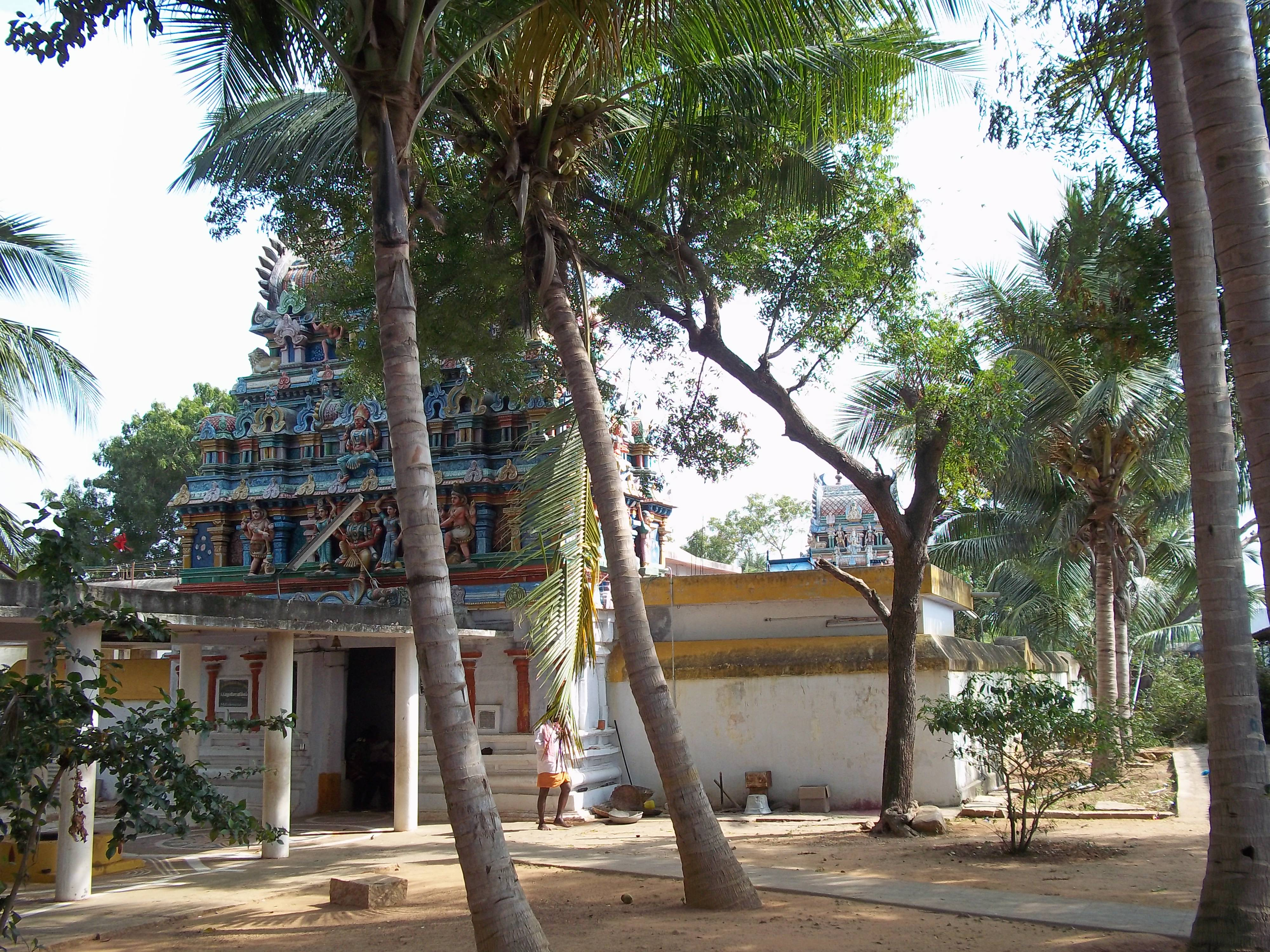
Egowriamman Temple

Egowriamman Temple is a Hindu temple at Vallam in Thanjavur in the Thanjavur district of Tamil Nadu, South India, India. There is a two-headed statue of Mother Ambika in the temple, sitting on a lotus-shaped Peeta. One face is ferocious, with long and sharp teeth showing her destructive side against the demons. The other face is calm, smiling and graceful, protecting the devotees and righteous from evils. The Mother has different weapons in her eight hands and also a parrot representing Mother Parvathi. The Chakra, being an important form of Shakti worship, is installed under the feet of the Mother.

== Hours of operation ==
The opening hours of the temple are:

Monday to Thursday, 8:00 AM to 2:00 PM and 4:00 PM to 6:30 PM

Friday, 7:00 AM to 7:30 PM

On days with a full or new moon the opening hours are 7:00 AM to 7:30 PM

== Location ==
The temple is located at Thanjavur-Trichy road in Vallam, approximately 12 km from Thanjavur.

The temple is situated at the beginning of the road leading to Alakkudi.

== Origin legend ==
According to legend, there once lived an asura named Thanjasuran in Thanjavur who was an ardent Shiva devotee. Due to the power of his penance, he received a boon from Shiva that ensured that he could not be killed by human beings, Deva, or Trimurti. After receiving this power, Thanjasuran began committing many atrocities. In order to put a stop to them, the devas made a plea to Shiva. Shiva, in turn, asked her consort Gowri to kill Thanjasuran. Gowri killed the asura, who had come in the guise of an ox, by decapitating him. Thanjasuran lost the body of the ox, and his mortal body then fell to the ground as he died. Due to Gowri's anger, the region in which the killing took place was affected by drought and famine. Shiva advised Gowri to calm herself in order to save the people. After that everything returned to normal.

The people started worshiping and performing puja to Gowri, who later came to be known as Egori. The day the demon was killed was the last Friday of the Tamil month of Adi. The deity was known as 'Vallatthu Pattaraki' during the period of Parantaka I, Kalapidari, and Kaitthalappusa Nangai during the period of Rajaraja I. She was also called Vallatthukkali (Kali who belonged to Vallam). It is understood from inscriptions that the temple is also known as ‘Karikarl Chola Maakaal Temple’ and ‘Vikramachola Vinnakaram’.

== Structure ==
After entering through the main gopura, Vinayaka, Subramania, Lingam, Katthavarayan, Chandikesvarar, Varahi, Pratyangira, Saptamatas, and Nāga are found. In the outer prakara, Madurai Veeran is found along with his consorts. Karuppasamy, Lada Sanyasi and Katthan are also found there. The Kumbhabhishekham took place on 16 September 2013.

== Inscription ==
In the artha mandapa there is an inscription of Parantaka I from the 40th year of his rule, which suggests that the temple was built during the 9th century CE. According to the inscription, the maham mandapa, consisting of garbhagriha and artha mandapa, was built by Sevappa Nayak and his son Achuthappa Nayak in 1535 CE.

== Festivals ==
New Moon and Full Moon festivals are held in the temple on the last Friday of Adi month and during Aadi Perukku (July–August). On the day of Aadi Perukku the festival is also held at the Vallam Bazaar Street Mariamman Temple. During the festival Egowriamman, Mariamman, and Aiyanar come around the town as processional deities. On the last Friday, the "Adikkazhivu" festival is held. At that time Thimithi is held by the devotees. In the morning vegetarian food is served and in the evening non-vegetarian food is served. The offering of an ox is done during the night. Goat and poultry are also offered as a sacrifice for the guarding deities. Many devotees travel to Thanjavur to participate in the festival, with people often coming from Erode, Ramnad, Coimbatore, Bangalore, and many other areas. On the day of Chitra Pournami devotees believe that if they conduct the Chandi Homam they will be offered a boon by Durga, Lakshmi, and Sarasvati.
