= Siege of Trichinopoly (1660) =

1660 attempted siege of Trichinopoly

Coordinates: 10.825334°N 78.689103°E

- Part of Madurai-Tanjore Conflicts
Date	1660
Location	Tiruchirapalli, modern-day Tamil Nadu, India
Result	Madurai Nayaks victory
Territorial changes	No changes to Trichinopoly; and Tanjore was shortly captured by Madurai after Vijaya Raghava surrenders.

Belligerents
Madurai Nayaks	Bijapur Sultanate; Tanjore Nayaks

Commanders and leaders
Chokkanatha Nayak	Shahaji; Sagosi; Lingama Nayaka; Vijaya Raghava Nayak

Strength
50,000–70,000 cavalry	12,000 infantry 7,000 cavalry

The siege of Trichinopoly in 1660 was a conflict during Chokkanatha Nayak's reign in Madurai, when a Bijapuri army led by Shahaji, and aided by Tanjore, laid siege to the Trichinopoly fort with a combined force of 12,000 infantry and 7,000 cavalry. At the same time, Nayak rallied support for his Madurai army, which at one time during the siege grew to 70,000 strong, and this led the Bijapuri and Lingama Nayak to flee to Tanjore, and subsequently from there to Gingee. The Tanjore army was later defeated by Nayak following the abject surrender of its king, Vijaya Raghava.

== Background ==
Shortly after the death of Muttuvirappa Alakadari Nayak in July 1659, Chokkanatha Nayak ascended to the throne of Madurai at the young age of sixteen. (Note: The date of Chokkanatha's ascension to the throne of Madurai is disputed according to various sources but an inscription at Jayantisvara Temple at Tiruchirapalli dates it to 1659.) To assist with the handling of his duties, he had three officers–Pradhani, Rayasam, and Dalavayi Lingama Nayaka. Unbeknownst to Nayak, these officers wanted to usurp power by staging a war against Bijapur at Gingee, whereby taking a 40,000 Madurai army, Lingama apparently fought against the Bijapuri Mohammedan army, but in reality, he had accepted a bribe from Bijapuris and was secretly plotting to become the king of Madurai by overthrowing Nayak. The plot also included the restoration of Sriranga III of Vijayanagara to Madurai's throne.

The plot was spoiled when a lady courtier of Madurai received the information, and informed Nayak of the same. As a result, he called on the palace guards to have the three officers arrested. Two of them were caught and then punished by Nayak. Rayasam was executed on the spot, while the Brahmin Pradhani was spared execution because of his caste but was punished with blindness. When the turn came to punish Lingama, he came to know that the plot was spoiled, and also that the king was coming after his life. Lingama prevented capture by the guards, and escaped to Tanjore from where the Siege of Trichinopoly was to follow.

== Siege ==
For the siege, Lingama brought Tanjore's army, led by Vijaya Raghava, and Bijapuri army, led by Shahaji, to face Madurai. At the same time, the Madurai army numbered at around 50,000 later grew to 70,000 when Nayak's alluring reputation as a general grew, and the army started getting new recruits. Meanwhile, the Bijapuri and Tanjore armies had a combined total of 12,000 infantry and 7,000 cavalry.

Nayak took his cavalry army and in the ensuing battle while outnumbering the enemy, had defeated the Bijapuri and Tanjore's armies. Shahaji and Lingama Nayaka both fled to Tanjore, and then to Gingee. Vijaya Raghava later surrenders, and the capture of Tanjore is overturned by Nayak, which brings back the daily life of the villagers to normal.

== Aftermath ==
The consequences of the siege (and the ongoing rivalry between Tanjore and Madurai kingdoms in 1659–1662) were aggravating to the people from both sides, and especially Tanjore. Survivors had emigrated to other Indian kingdoms to work as coolies, and Tanjore's Christians were persecuted by the fear of Bijapuri army and famine which used to be common at the time. Also the situation of the Hindus in both the kingdoms declined as the Dutch traders were trading them to foreign countries as slaves.

The abject surrender by Vijaya Raghava enraged him, because of which he plotted a retaliatory siege on Trichinopoly and its ruler, Chokkanatha Nayak with the help of Bijapuri general, Vanamian, in 1663. The later campaign fared better than the 1660 siege attempt as in the end, Nayak was forced to pay tributes to both Tanjore as well as Bijapur, to spare Madurai's inhabitants in return. Following this, Shahaji turned on his own ally from Tanjore with a conquest of Mannargudi and the Vallam Kottai fort.
