= Raghunathabhyudayam =

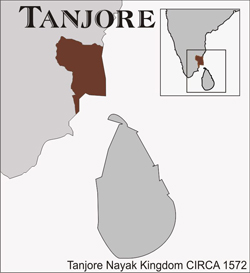
Tanjore Nayak Kingdom

The Raghunāthābhyudayam (or Raghunāthā-bhyudayam, Raghunāthābhyudaya, Ragunatha Abhyudaya) by Rāmabhadrāmbā, one of the wives of the Thanjavur Nayak king Raghunatha Nayak (r. 1600-34), is a Sanskrit mahākāvya in twelve cantos. It was designed to valorise Raghunatha, situating his career as a type of the life of epic Rāma-Viṣṇu-Kṛṣṇa.

The first few cantos of the poem invoke Raghunatha, seeking his patronage and assistance, and praise his generosity, piety, and intellect. Canto 4 presents Raghunatha's ancestry and the subsequent cantos discuss his early life and military successes. He succeeds his father Achuthappa Nayak in canto 8 and continues with his military exploits. The last two cantos focus on the cultural activities and artistic achievements of his court, with a colophon in which Rāmabhadrāmbā emphasises her own merits.

The poem was first brought to scholarly attention by S. Krishnaswami Ayyangar in 1919, after he found it in November 1916. The poem was fiercely criticised by an early reviewer of the first scholarly edition, who claimed that Rāmabhadrāmbā 'had thoroughly assimilated the art of composing a poem of surpassing tediousness and consisting of the most abject flattery of her royal patron' and did not think the poem would have any interest to historians. But it has since been identified as a significant source for the cultural history of seventeenth-century south India.

Rāmabhadrāmbā's Sanskrit Raghunāthābhyudayam is not to be confused with the identically named Telugu poem the Raghunāthābhyudayam and the similarly named Raghunāthanāyakabhyudayamu, both composed by Raghunatha's eldest son and successor, Vijayarāghava Nāyaka.

== Editions and translations ==
- Rāmabhadrāmbā, 'Raghunāthābhyudayam', in Sources of Vijayanagar History (Selected and Edited for the University), ed. by S. Krishnaswami Ayyangar [and A. Rangaswami Sarasvati], The Madras University Historical Series, 1 (Madras: University of Madras, 1919), pp. 284–302 [no. 91], https://archive.org/details/sourcesofvijayan00krisrich. [Abridged edition and translation.]
- Raghunāthābhyudayamahākāvyam: Rāmabhadrāmbāviracitam, ed. by Ti. Rā. Cintāmaṇiḥ, Bulletins of the Sanskrit Department, University of Madras, 2 ([Madras]: Madrapurīyaviśvavidyālayaḥ, 1934)
