= Krishnadhwari =

Krishnadhwari was a Telugu poet who resided in the court of the Thanjavur Nayak king p-ranghunathanNayak. He is remembered for the authorship of Naishadha Parijaatheeyamu, a Slesha kavya. The Naishadha Parijaatheeyamu relates the story of Nala and Krishna, each verse being a double entendre.
