= Raghunatha Ramayana =

Telugu translation of Hindu epic

Raghunatha Ramayana is a Telugu translation of the Hindu epic Ramayana made by the Thanjavur Nayak ruler Raghunatha Nayak. Of the whole work, only the first three cantos and a part of the fourth is extant.
