= Ayyampettai =

Ayyampettai may refer to,

- Ayyampettai (Kancheepuram district), a town in Kancheepuram district, Tamil Nadu
- Ayyampettai (Vellore district), a village panchayat in Vellore district, Tamil Nadu
- Ayyampettai (Thanjavur district), a town in Thanjavur district, Tamil Nadu
