= Usurpation of Rustum Khan =

Date	1678–1680
Location	Tamil Nadu, India
Result	Loyalist victory

Belligerents
Madurai Nayak Loyalists	Usurper

Commanders and leaders
Chokkanatha Nayak; Govindappaiya; Raghunatha Kilavan; Chinna Kadir Nayak	Rustum Khan †

The Usurpation of Rustam Khan was a period of turmoil in the Madurai Nayak kingdom. Originally a trusted officer under Muttu Alakadri, Rustam Khan exploited the weaknesses of his benefactor and gradually consolidated power. Seizing control of Trichinopoly he imprisoned King Chokkanatha Nayak and forced Muttu Alakadri into exile. For two years, Rustam Khan ruled with unchecked authority, subjecting the royal family to indignities and oppressing the people. His downfall came when the loyal general Govindappaiya, along with Hindu chiefs like Chinna Kadir Naik and Raghunatha Kilavan orchestrated a surprise attack. Rustam Khan and his men were killed in a sudden musket fire, restoring Chokkanatha Nayak to the throne.

== Background ==
Chokkanatha Nayak's weak and indecisive foreign policy only worsened the hardships of his people. His failed attempt to conquer Tanjore drained his treasury and diminished his reputation. Meanwhile Mysore ruler Chikkadevaraja Wodeyar took advantage of this and seized the last two fortresses of Madurai along its northern frontier. As dissatisfaction among his subjects grew, Chokkanatha Nayak withdrew from governance and effectively became a recluse neglecting his royal duties. Whether due to his incompetence or the growing unrest among his ministers, he eventually handed over administrative responsibilities to his brother, Muttu Alakadri. However, Alakadri proved to be an incapable leader One of his significant mistakes was elevating Rustam Khan, a Muslim adventurer who had joined his service.

Muttu Alakadri, having placed the entire administration in the hands of Rustam Khan, soon fell into the same pattern of negligence and tyranny as his brother. Meanwhile, Rustam Khan, instead of showing gratitude betrayed his benefactor. The sudden acquisition of authority only fueled his ambition, making him aspire to complete control over the kingdom. To secure his position, he recruited a strong force of loyal Muslim followers, ensuring their dominance in key positions within the state. Through this strategy, he managed to place his trusted men in charge of guarding the fort of Trichinopoly further consolidating his influence. Rustam Khan finally issued an ultimatum either Muttu Alakadri must abandon his kingdom or face death. Muttu Alakadri fled to Negapatam leaving the kingdom in the hands of his treacherous Rustum Khan.

Rustam Khan, having secured his hold on power imprisoned King Chokkanatha Nayak within the palace, stripping him of all authority and subjecting him to humiliation. For two years, he ruled with absolute control, assuming the full responsibilities of kingship. His tyranny extended even to the royal harem where his dishonorable conduct brought disgrace and suffering. Many noblewomen, unwilling to endure such indignities, chose death over dishonor.

== Downfall of Rustum Khan ==
Govindappaiya, the loyal general, along with the Polygars and Raghunatha Kilavan took it upon themselves to restore rightful rule. Govindappaiya organized a strong Hindu faction to oppose Rustam Khan’s tyranny. he secretly dispatched a message to Chinna Kadir Nayak, the chief of Kannivadi, and to the Setupati, urging them to march toward Trichinopoly and aid in the city’s liberation.

Upon their arrival, Govindappaiya informed the chiefs of the king’s dire condition and the urgent need for action. He laid out a plan to strike the next day by leading a well armed force to the revenue office, where Rustam Khan could be captured and eliminated. As planned, the chiefs and their soldiers appeared at the office gates, their presence raising Rustam Khan’s suspicions. He questioned the unusual assembly but Govindappaiya maintaining composure assured him that they had merely gathered for the customary revenue settlement. However at the decisive moment, he secretly signaled for the attack. Instantly two thousand musket shots rang out catching Rustam Khan and his men off guard. The sudden onslaught left them no time to react and within moments they were annihilated and Rustum Khan was killed.

== Aftermath ==
The Dindigul Polygar rushed to the palace with the joyous news of Rustam Khan’s downfall, expecting the king to emerge from captivity. However Chokkanatha Nayak still cautious refused to step out until he personally saw the traitor’s severed head. Chinna Kadir Nayak explained that identifying Rustam’s body was difficult, as it lay among the countless slain. Yet the king remained adamant revealing that Rustam had a distinct mark on his ear. Acting on this clue the soldiers carefully examined the fallen corpses until they located Rustam’s remains. His head was severed and presented before Chokkanatha Nayak who satisfied at last stepped out of his confinement and reclaimed his throne. His first action as ruler was to summon his exiled brother Muttu Alakadri back from Negapatam.

== See also ==
- Raghunatha Kilavan
- Chokkanatha Nayak
- Kingdom of Mysore
