= Chemakura Venkataraju =

17th century Telugu poet

Chemakura Venkataraju was a Telugu poet in the court of the Thanjavur Nayak king Raghunatha Nayak who ruled from 1600 to 1634. He wrote Vijayavilasamu, a prabandha on the marriage of the Indian mythological hero Arjuna with Ulupi and Subhadra. In a preface to the work, Venkataraju heaps praise on Raghunatha Nayak. Chemakura was the first person to write a prabandha on Sarangadhara, an epic popular in Western India
