= Madhuravani =

Indian scholar and poet

Madhuravani was a scholar and poet who lived in Thanjavur during the reign of the Thanjavur Nayak king Raghunatha Nayak (r. 1600-34). She is widely renowned for her Sanskrit translation of Raghunatha's Ramayana kavya. She also wrote many other Sanskrit works such as Kumarasambhavam and Naishadham. Tharu and Lalita says that she "could compose poetry in three languages and was an expert in ashtavadhanam (the capacity to attend to eight different intellectual activities at the same time)."
