= Thanjavur cannon =

Early modern cannons located in Thanjavur, India

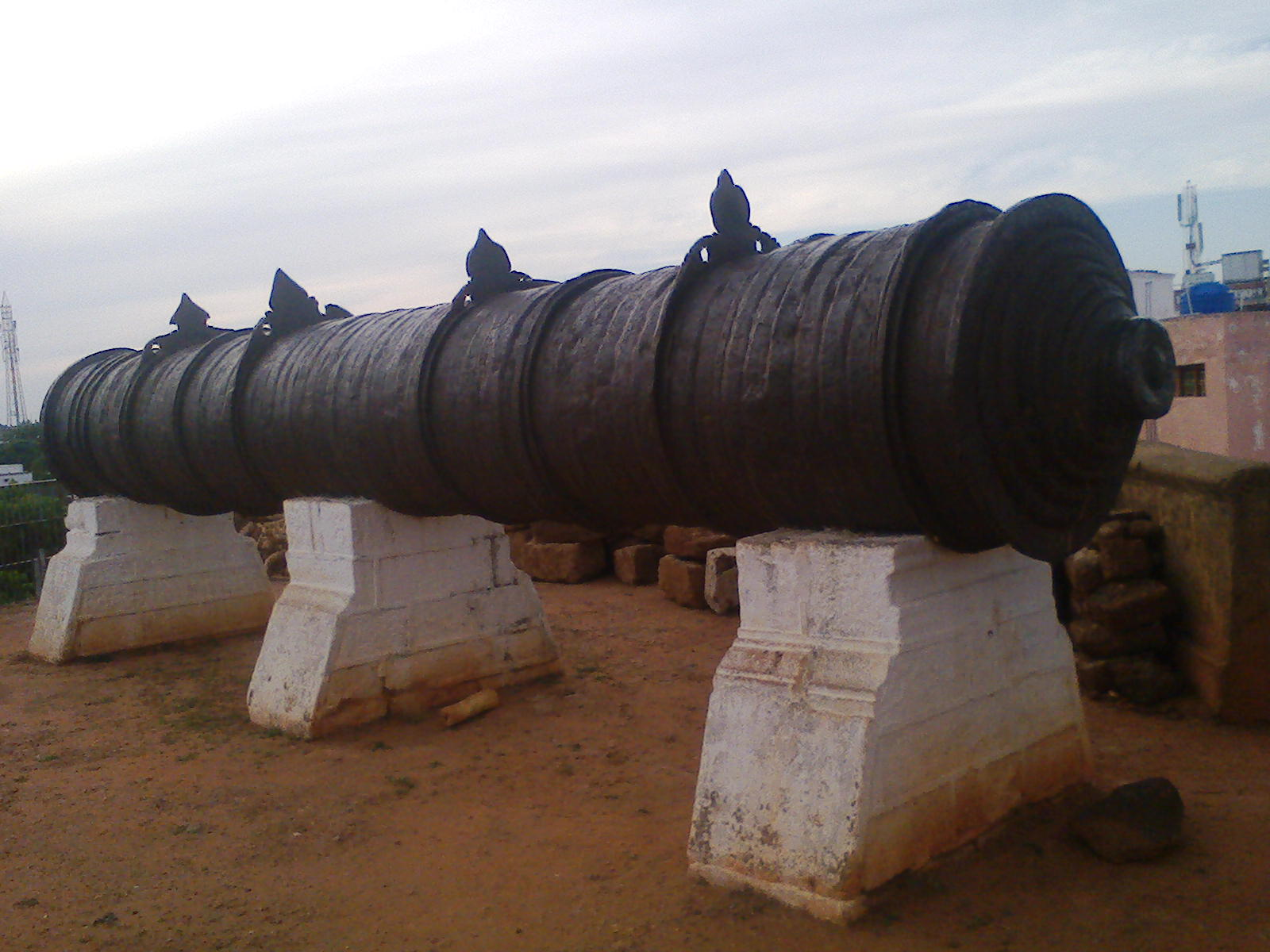
Thanjavur cannon

The Thanjavur cannon is one of the largest early modern cannons located in Thanjavur, Thanjavur district, Tamil Nadu, India.

== Location ==
The Thanjavur cannon, also known as Rajagopala Beerangi, is a massive cannon kept on a mount in Beerangi Medu, Thanjavur, on the east rampart of the Thanjavur Fort. It is located at the heart of the city and located very near to the Peruvudaiyaar Temple. Autos and buses are available to reach the place where it is kept.

== Specialities ==
It was made with cutting-edge technology of its time. The high standard of iron and steel technology in ancient and medieval India is reflected in the manufacture and use of numerous large iron objects, including forge-welded cannons. Such cannons are found in Murshidabad, Dacca (in Bangladesh), Bijapur, Gulbarga, and Thanjavur. Based on its weight and size, the cannon at Thanjavur is regarded as one of the largest forge-welded iron cannons in the world. It takes fourth place in the list of Largest Cannons fired in the World History. It was named "Rajagopala Beerangi (Cannon)", but is popularly known as "Daasimettu Beerangi". It is placed on an elevated (25’high) defense barricade at the Eastern Rampart.

The cannon was cast in 1620 at Kollumedu. The metallurgical skills displayed speak volumes of the people in 17th century. It is said that Tamils' technical know how was used to cast the cannon. It was mounted in 1620 CE when Raghunatha Nayak ruled Thanjavur.

== Composition ==
The over 400 year-old cannon, though exposed to sun and rain, has not rusted so far. It is 26 feet long and weighs 20 tonnes. It is forge welded and has not been made by casting. Its outer circle is 300 cm in diameter, while the inner circle is 150 cm in diameter. The inside of the barrel is made of 43 long iron plates and the outer of 94 iron rings. To lift the cannon, eight rings were attached on top, but only two survive today. It can fire a 1000 kg iron cannonball.

== Operation ==
This cannon was used in 1650 during the Nayak period to protect Thanjavur from enemies entering through the East Gate of the town. From the site, one can see the Sarja madi (seven-floor structure) and the Arsenal tower of Nayak Palace on the western side.

== Preservation ==
In the 21st Century, the Thanjavur cannon is a protected monument of the Archaeological Survey of India.
