= Ramabhadramba =

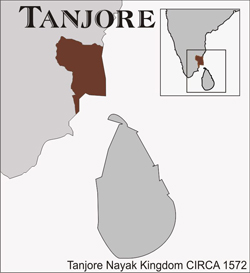
Tanjore Nayak Kingdom

Rāmabhadrāmbā was a poet and consort of the Thanjavur Nayak king Raghunatha Nayak (r. 1600–34). She wrote the Sanskrit epic Raghunathabhyudayam, a biography of her husband. Ramabhadramba was also a disciple of the Telugu poet Chengalva Kalakavi. Tharu and Lalita says that she "could compose poetry in three languages and was an expert in Ashtavadhanam (the capacity to attend to eight different intellectual activities at the same time)." They also claim that she was a historian who left behind "accounts of the political and military events in Raghunandanayaka's reign" and has documented the presence of several women composers in the court.
