= Ayyampettai (Vellore district) =

- city
- Location in Tamil Nadu, India Ayyampettai (India)
- Coordinates: 12°56′21″N 79°27′56″E
- Country: India
- State: Tamil Nadu
- District: Vellore

Languages
  - Official: Tamil
- Time zone: UTC+5:30 (IST)

Ayyampettai or Cheri Ayyampettai is a village panchayat in Vellore district in the state of Tamil Nadu, India.

== Location ==
Cheri is one of the villages in the Kaveripakkam Taluk of Vellore District. It is 1.9 km distance from its Taluk Main Town Kaveripakkam, 37.6 km distance from its district capital Vellore and 85 km distance from its state capital Chennai.

== Place of Worship ==
Anniyamman temple is located in Cheri Ayyampettai. It is primarily worshipped by Serathooran koottam of Sengunthar community. Wikimapia Location of Anniyamman Temple anniyamman rice mill near subaramanniyasamy temple
