= Ayyampettai, Kancheepuram =

Ayyampettai
- Census town
- Location in Tamil Nadu, India
- Coordinates: 12°48′19.74″N 79°45′41.12″E
- Country: India
- State: Tamil Nadu
- District: Kancheepuram

Population (2001)
  - Total: 6,022

Languages
  - Official: Tamil
- Time zone: UTC+5:30 (IST)
- Postal code: 631601

Ayyampettai is a census town in Kancheepuram district in the state of Tamil Nadu, India.

== Demographics ==
As of 2001 India census, Ayyampettai had a population of 6022. Males constitute 52% of the population and females 48%. Ayyampettai has an average literacy rate of 66%, higher than the national average of 59.5%; with 58% of the males and 42% of females literate. 10% of the population is under 6 years of age.

== Economy ==
Ayyampettai is basically dependent on weaving kanchipuram silk saris. Rice and Sugarcane are cultivated, irrigation is done by well.

== Transport ==
The banks of River palar is just 3km away from Ayyampettai bus stop. Buses run frequently throughout the day to Chennai, Chengalpattu, as the village falls in the Kanchipuram-Chengleput Highway.
