= Sevappa Nayaka =

Nayak of Thanjavur from 1532 to 1560

1st Nayaka of Thanjavur
- In office 1532–1560
- Preceded by: Viswanatha Nayak (as Nayaka of Madurai)
- Succeeded by: Achyutappa Nayaka

Personal details
- Died: 1580 Thanjavur, Nayakdom of Tanjore, Vijayanagara Empire. (present-day Thanjavur, Tamil Nadu, India)
- Spouse: Murtimamba
- Children: Achyutappa Nayaka
- Parents: Timma Bhupati (father); Bayyambika (mother)

Military service
- Allegiance: Vijayanagara Empire
- Rank: Dalavay
- Battles/wars: Raichur Campaign; Battle of Raichur

Sevappa Nayaka was a Nayaka (governor) of Thanjavur under the Vijayanagara Empire from 1532 to 1560.

== Ancestry and personal life ==
Sevappa was the successor of his father Timmappa Nayaka, also known as Timmabuban and Timmabhupati, the Viceroy of northern Arcot and his wife Bayyambika. The family hailed from Nedungundram near Tiruvannamalai. Timmappa Nayaka served Emperor Krishnadevaraya in the high honoured position of Vāśal i.e. door-keeper.

He married Murtimamba, the sister of princess Tirumalamba and the sister-in-law of Emperor Achyuta Deva Raya. The duo had a son in Achyutappa who is named in the honour of their emperor.

The Telugu histories Tanjavuri Andhra Rajula Charitramu and Tanjavuri Vari Charitram claim that Sevappa was awarded Thanjavur province as stridhana. However, this opinion is not universally held by scholars.

== Campaigns ==
Sevappa was a loyal vassal of the Vijayanagara Emperors and assisted them in their campaigns. Sevappa was a dalavay for Emperor Krishna Deva Raya in his Raichur campaign. He later served as the Tambula Karandavahin (lit. 'betel-bearer') to Krishnadevaraya's successor Achyuta Deva Raya.

== Reign ==
Sevappa's epigraphs are very few and there exist scarcely any record of his reign or campaigns outside the Chola country. One of the earliest events of his reign was the transfer of Tiruchirappalli to the Madurai Nayakdom in exchange for Vallam on imperial orders. The Nayak of Madurai is said to have fortified Tiruchirappalli by building a double-walled fort therein and by constructing a big tank inside it. The necessity for fortifying the place, it is said in the chronicles, was due to the predatory ravages and hardships from which the country suffered at the hands of robbers who swooped down on the pilgrims bound for Rameshwaram and caused much injury to them, both bodily and materially. He was a loyal vassal of the Vijayanagara Emperors Krishnadevaraya and Achyuta Deva Raya. He continued this tradition of loyalty with Emperor Sadasiva Raya when the latter's general Ramaraja Vittala stationed himself and his army in Tiruchirappalli during Empire's wars against the expanding king of Tiruvadi and the Paravas of the fishery coast in 1545. Sevappa provided the general with men and support for the campaign and beyond as the latter stayed as Viceroy of the south for a decade. His reign was one of peace and comparative prosperity and this is best seen in his works of charity and magnificent buildings.

== Grants and public works ==
The Nayak's primary source of state revenue was land tax. In addition to land revenue, taxes were imposed on various articles of merchandise. Profession and wealth taxes were also in effect, and a marriage tax was collected. Certain temple festivals were subject to levies, including the Pidari tax. Customs duties were imposed on foreigners, and individuals carrying arms were taxed at higher rates. Specific occupational taxes, such as those on goldsmiths, as well as grazing taxes, were also collected. According to Jesuit accounts, the king is said to have claimed up to half of the agricultural produce as land revenue. Payments were generally made in cash. Administration was conducted through numerous local agents appointed by the Nayak. These officials oversaw smaller administrative divisions and acted as representatives of the ruler, including the collection of royal dues and taxes.

Sevappa constructed temples, repaired a number of tanks and endowed agraharas. Sevappa repaired the Sivaganga Tank at Tanjore (now within the premises of the Sivaganga Park). The Sivaganga fort also was repaired by him. In 1572, Sevappa Nayak embellished the temples at Tirumala and Srisailam with gold. Sevappa is said to have constructed the prakaras in the temples at Vriddhachalam and Kanchipuram. In the Chola country, his benefactions impartially extended to both the Siva and Vishnu temples situated on either side of the holy river Cauvery. Besides, he made gifts of villages and precious jewels to the gods and provided for the feeding of the Brahmanas. He also granted seven velis of land to the Samusarupalli mosque near Nanjikottai in 1550 and a village to the Madhva saint Vijayendra Tirtha in 1574. In 1579, he grant vast lands to the Buddhist temple at Thiruvilandurai.

Sevappa also patronized Portuguese merchants. A biography of Luso-Christian colonial missionary Francis Xavier from Nagapattinam says that the Portuguese "were greatly favoured by the lord of the country who is a very powerful captain of the king of Bisnaga".

== Later life ==
In his later days, Sevappa appointed his son Achyutappa as Yuvaraja and co-ruler. In about 1563, Sevappa handed over authority in administrative matters to him and concentrated on acts of charity. Sevappa died in 1580 and was succeeded by Achyutappa.

Sevappa Nayaka Nayaks of Thanjavur
Preceded by None	Raja of Thanjavur; 1532-1560	Succeeded by Achuthappa Nayak
