= Raghunatha Nayak =

- Maharaja Of Thanjavur Nayak Kingdom
- Reign: 1600–1634
- Coronation: 1614
- Predecessor: Achuthappa Nayak
- Successor: Vijaya Raghava Nayak
- Born: Unknown; Thanjavur
- Died: 1634
- Consort: Kalavati, Chenchamma Ramabhadramba
- Issue: Vijaya Raghava Nayak
- House: House of Nayak
- Dynasty: Thanjavur Nayak Dynasty

Raghunatha Nayak was a Telugu king of the Thanjavur Nayak Dynasty. He was the third ruler of Thanjavur, Tamil Nadu, from the Nayak dynasty. He ruled from 1600 to 1634 and is noted for the attainments of Thanjavur in literature, art, and Carnatic music.

== Early life ==
Raghunatha Nayak was the eldest son of Achuthappa Nayak and was born after intense penance by his father. The Raghunathabhyudayam and Sahityanatyakara give a detailed account of his childhood. As a boy, Raghunatha learned the shastras, the art of warfare and administration. He had multiple queens, chiefly Kalavati referred to in the Raghunathabhyudayam as Pattampurani. Ramabhadramba, who wrote a history of the Thanjavur Nayak dynasty, was one of his concubines.

=== Wars With Golconda Sultanate ===
In his early days, Raghunatha won acclaim fighting the Golconda Sultanate. He ascended the throne in 1600, ruled with his father from 1600 to 1614, and as sole monarch from 1614 to 1634.

== Campaigns and wars ==
In 1614, Sriranga II, the Emperor of Vijayanagar, was killed by a rival claimant, Jaggaraya. Raghunatha proceeded against Jaggaraya to avenge the murder. Different accounts give varying versions of the events. According to Ramabhadramba, Raghunatha first fought a rebellious regional chieftain called Solaga, pursuing him to Kumbakonam and then besieging him in his island-fortress on the Kollidam before turning his attention to the Portuguese and attacking Jaffna. After his victory over the Portuguese, Ramabhadramba claims, Raghunatha returned to the Indian mainland, where he pursued Jaggaraya to Toppur and defeated him. He later constructed a pillar of victory and took possession of Bhuvanagiri near Chidambaram.

According to Yagnanarayana Dikshita, the campaign had been preceded by a council held by Achuthappa Nayak in which Raghunatha, Govinda Dikshita and the exiled king of Jaffna Ethirimana Cinkam participated. The whole campaign against Jaggaraya and the Solaga was the outcome of this conference.

The Battle of Toppur was dated 12 December 1616 based on the Raghunathabyudayam, which states that Raghunatha was camping at Pazhamaneri in August 1616. Portuguese chroniclers dated Raghunatha's victories in Jaffna to the beginning of 1616. The campaign against the Solaga must have also taken place at this time.

=== Campaign against the Solaga ===
The Raghunathabyudayam says that Solaga was the ruler of an island (Antaripagataha) and a feudatory of Krishnappa Nayak of Gingee. He is described as a highwayman who attacked passers-by and stole their belongings. Raghunatha's campaign was a punitive expedition to put an end to his activities.

Raghunatha attacked Solaga's headquarters near Kumbakonam. Supported by Krishnappa Nayak, the Portuguese and Muslim mercenaries, Solaga put up strong resistance but was finally defeated by Raghunatha's artillery. He was captured and imprisoned along with his family.

=== Invasion of Jaffna ===
Following the victory over Solaga, Raghunatha attacked Jaffna. Enthiramana helped the re-founded Kandyan Kingdom King Vimaladharmasuriya I (1593–1604) and King Senarat (1604–1635) to secure help from South India to resist the Portuguese. Like Bhuvanekabahu VII of Kotte Kingdom, through a mixture of native cunning and the ability to perform a delicate balancing act, the Jaffna king secured a surprising degree of room for maneuver. While according to Nayak chronicles, Raghunatha himself led the expedition, according to Portuguese records, the campaign was led by one Khem Nayak, a general in service of Raghunatha. The Thanjavur Nayak forces were victorious in evicting the Portuguese from Jaffna. Cankili II of the Aryachakravarti Dynasty was placed on the throne. However, Cankili II ruled for barely two years before being overthrown and killed in 1619.

=== Battle of Toppur ===
On his return to India, Raghunatha Nayak personally led an army against Jaggaraya, who had usurped the throne of Vijayanagar after killing Sriranga II. Jaggaraya was assisted by the Madurai Nayak Dynasty and Nayaks of Gingee. Yagnanarayana Dikshita mentions that Jaggaraya had the support of the Yavanas and Parasikas, whose identities remain unclear. Raghunatha's army consisted of strong infantry and cavalry divisions, elephant corps, and armed soldiers. The Vijayanagar claimant Rama Deva Raya fought alongside him.

The two armies met at Toppur. Raghunatha was completely victorious; Jaggaraya was captured and killed, and Rama Deva Raya was placed on the throne.

=== Later campaigns ===
Raghunatha also conducted minor campaigns. Though he failed to prevent the Aryachakravarti dynasty from being overthrown, he kept up the pressure against the Portuguese by supporting rebellions. The Karaiyars—a class of fishermen along the Gulf of Mannar—made six attempts between 1620 and 1621 to overthrow Portuguese rule. Raghunatha, himself, sent five armies between 1619 and 1621 to conquer Jaffna, but they failed.

== Patronage of arts and music ==
Raghunatha patronized Carnatic music in his kingdom. The Nayak himself composed a number of Yakshaganas and was a good veena player. Kshetrayya, the composer from Muvva, visited Thanjavur and composed padas during his reign. Raghunatha also renovated a number of Vaishnavite temples. He constructed the Ramaswamy Temple in Kumbakonam, the popular Saraswathi Mahal Library in Thanjavur and the gopura of the Adi Kumbeswarar Temple in Kumbakonam. He expanded the Uppiliappan Temple and the Rajagopalaswamy Temple, Mannargudi. The car festivals of Thiruvaiyaru and Pasupatikoil were conducted on a lavish scale.

During the time of Raghunatha the structure of the veena also evolved and he invented the raga Jayantasena and the tala Ramananda. He also composed a number of kavyas in Telugu, important ones being Parijatapaharanamu, Valmikicharitram, Rukminiparinaya Yakshaganam and Ramayanam. He wrote the Sanskrit plays Sangita Sudha and Bharatha Sudha. The Telugu poets Ramabhadramba, Madhuravani, Chemakura Venkataraju and Krishnadhwari were active during his reign. Raghunatha was also an expert sword-fighter and horse rider.

Raghunatha's biographies note his generosity towards Brahmins. Raghunatha constructed several agraharas and gave costly gifts to poor Brahmins and the disabled. A 1604 inscription from Narattampoondi records Raghunatha's gift of the village of Kailasapuram for upkeeping the Srirangam temple. He also gave lavish gifts to the Madhva pontiff, Vijayendra Tirtha, and the Sri Mutt in Kumbakonam.

== Relationship with European powers ==
Raghunatha maintained cordial relations with the Danes and the English. The Portuguese had established factories at San Thome and Nagapattinam on the eastern coast before the accession of Raghunatha, while the Dutch founded a settlement at Tegnapatnam in 1610. South Indian rulers patronized and supported the Dutch to neutralize the belligerent Portuguese. Ove Gjedde of the Danish East India Company founded the settlement of Tranquebar on 19 November 1620. Following a visit to Raghunatha's court, the English captain John Johnson and Brockedon, the President of the English settlements, tried to convince the directors of the East India Company to send a mission to Thanjavur. Johnson wrote home:

... the Great Naik demands of men what the reason is that the English do not desire to trade in his land as well as Portugal, saying they shall have the pepper and anything the land doth afford and likewise buy the commodities that they do bring with them as tin, lead, iron and red cloth is well sold. Little does our nation know how they are expected all this land, and thus the Danes do trade under the name of the English and are marvelous well used.

Johnson's proposal was approved; a mission landed at Karaikal on 23 May 1624 and proceeded inland to Thanjavur to seek an audience with the king, reaching the capital in June. Raghunatha received the visitors warmly and granted them permits to trade freely in Karaikal. However, Raghunatha later withdrew his concessions and demanded an annual rent of 7,000 riyals. This volte-face has been attributed to pressure from the Portuguese and the Danes. Nevertheless, Johnson rejected the Nayak's offer and returned to England, where his activities were severely censured. The English also tried to get Pondicherry from the Gingee Nayaks and failed.

== Extent of Raghunatha's kingdom ==
Raghunatha's empire extended far beyond the confines of Thanjavur district. His inscriptions have been found in Thirukkoshtiyur in Ramanathapuram district, Lalgudi in Tiruchirappalli district, Govindavadi in Kanchipuram district, and Nedugunram and Narattampoondi in Vellore district.

== Notes ==
Raghunatha Nayak Nayaks of Thanjavur
Preceded by Achuthappa Nayak	Raja of Thanjavur; 1600–1634	Succeeded by Vijaya Raghava Nayak
