= Stridhana =

Concept in Hindu law

Stridhana is a term associated with property in Hindu law. Whether property is stridhan, or a woman’s estate, depends on the source from which it has been obtained. A woman has inalienable rights over stridhan, and she can claim the same even after separation from her husband.

== Characteristics of stridhana ==
=== Under Hindu law ===
Properties acquired from the following sources by a Hindu female constitute sridhan.

- Gifts and bequests received from relations (The Dāyabhāga School however doesn’t recognize gifts of immovable property by her husband as stridhan)
- Gifts and bequests from non-relations/strangers
- Property acquired by self exertion, science and arts. (A woman may acquire property at any stage of her life by her own self exertion, such as by manual labor, employment, or by singing, dancing etc., or by any mechanical art. According to all schools of Hindu law, the property thus acquired during widowhood or maidenhood is her stridhan. The property thus acquired during coverture also constitutes her stridhan according to all schools other than the Mithila and Bengal Schools. During her husband’s lifetime, however, it is subject to his control.)
- Property purchased with the income of stridhan.
- Property purchased under a compromise.
- Property obtained by adverse possession.
- Property obtained in lieu of maintenance.
- Property received in inheritance.
- Property obtained on partition.

=== Under Vedic culture ===
Stridhana, as defined by Yajnavalkya is:

- Wealth received by the woman from her father, mother, husband or brother out of love and affection.
- Wealth given to the bride by her maternal uncle and relative etc. at the time of marriage in presence of nuptial fire.
- Wealth that is given by the husband at the time of second marriage to satisfy his previous wife.
- Wealth given to the bride by the cousins and relatives of her parents.
- Wealth given to the bride from the side of the bride-groom prior to marriage towards duty.
- Wealth given to the newly wedded bride at the time of her departure from her father's house.
- Wealth received by the bride in her matrimonial house after the marriage.
- Wealth given to the new daughter-in-law by the father-in-law or mother-in-law out of love and affection.
- Wealth received by a married or unmarried daughter in her parental house from her brother or parent.

Manu has prescribed six kinds of stridhana to the minimum extent. According to Manusmriti, after the death of an issueless woman, her relatives are entitled to get her stridhan. If the marriage has been performed in the form of Brahma, Daiva, Gandharba or Prajapatya, the husband of the deceased issueless woman is entitled to get the stridhan, however, in case of Asura, Rakhyasa and Paisacha form of marriage, the stridhan of an issueless, deceased woman is taken by her father or mother.

== Hindu Succession Act ==
The Hindu Succession Act (Act No. 30 of 1956) resulted in many changes being made to both the Mitākṣarā and the Dāyabhāga systems regarding succession and partition.
