= Alagiri Nayak =

Alagiri Nayak was the younger brother of the Madurai Nayak king Chokkanatha Nayak and the last Nayak king of Thanjavur. In 1675, Thanjavur was conquered by Ekoji I, the half-brother of Shivaji who founded the Thanjavur Maratha kingdom.

Alagiri Nayak Nayaks of Thanjavur
| Preceded by Vijaya Raghava Nayak | Raja of Thanjavur; 1673-1675 | Succeeded by Ekoji I (as the Thanjavur Maratha ruler) |
