= Achuthappa Nayak =

Nayaka of Tanjore from 1560 to 1614

Achyutappa

2nd Nayaka of Tanjore
- In office 1580–1614
- Preceded by: Sevappa Nayak
- Succeeded by: Raghunatha Nayak

Yuvaraja of Tanjore
- In office 1560–1580

Personal details
- Died: Thanjavur, Nayakdom of Tanjore, Vijayanagara Empire. (present-day Thanjavur, Tamil Nadu, India)
- Children: Raghunatha Nayak
- Parents: Sevappa Nayak (father); Murtimamba (mother)

Military service
- Allegiance: Vijayanagara Empire
- Battles/wars: Battle of Vallamprakara

Achuthappa Nayak was the Nayaka of Thanjavur under the Vijayanagara Empire from 1560 to 1614. From 1560 to 1580, he was co-Nayaka along with his father and from 1580 to 1614, he ruled on his own. His reign was eventful and its later years were marked by conflict.

== Personal life ==
Achyutappa Nayaka was the eldest son of Sevappa Nayak, the Vijayanagar feudatory of Arcot who was appointed the first Nayaka of Tanjore. His principal queen was Murtimamba.

== Names ==
Achyutappa Nayak was named by Sevappa Nayak in the honour of Vijayanagara Emperor Achyuta Deva Raya. During his lifetime, Achyutappa Nayaka was also known as Chinna Seva Achyutha and Sevappa Achyutha.

== Reign ==
Achyutappa ruled for a total of 54 years during which Thanjavur experienced architectural and cultural development. While the earlier part of his reign was peaceful, there was warfare with Turko-Persian Muslim and Portuguese-Christian invaders towards the end. He maintained peaceful relations with the Vijayanagara Emperors and assisted them in their campaigns. Achyutappa was assisted by his minister, the legendary Govinda Dikshitar.

=== Battle of Vallamprakara ===
In 1579, the Madurai Nayak Virappa Nayak rebelled against the Vijayanagara Emperor. Achyutappa fought Virappa along with Venkata II at Vallamprakara (the present-day Vallam near Thanjavur) and defeated him. This battle is not mentioned in any of Achyutappa's own inscriptions and the only references to this war are found in the Pudukkottai plates of Adivirarama Srivallabha and Varathungarama, both dated 1583. The validity of these plates have since been questioned by some as Venkatapati did not ascend the imperial throne until 1586. However, Venkatapati was already the Viceroy of the South, governing from Chandragiri and the Pudukkottai plates themselves reference this fact when they refer to the great Rama Raya of Talikota fame as "Emperor" and give no royal title to Venkatapati, only using his simple name. This ordinary reference to Venkatapati shows that at the time of Vallam battle he was not the emperor but only a viceroy.

=== Campaign against the Portuguese ===
The Sahityaratnakara describe Achyutappa's victory over Parasikas at Nagapattinam. Ramabadramba too refers to the campaign but names Achyutappa's enemies as "Parangi", the Tamil word used for colonial Eurochristians. During the early 17th century, the Portuguese were waging a concentrated campaign to conquer Jaffna and Achyutappa's attack on Nagapattinam might have been launched to assist the king of Jaffna. To supplant the Portuguese, Achyutappa also maintained friendly relations with the Dutch towards the end of his reign.

=== Art and architecture ===
On the whole, however, the kingdom progressed during Achuthappa's reign. Achuthappa built the Thiraikattuvar Mandapam in the Vilanagar temple in 1608 and made generous land grants to the Margasahayeshwara Temple at Muvalur near Mayiladuthurai, Thirumulasthana Temple at Chidambaram and Panaipakkam Temple. The Sangitha Sudha says that Achuthappa Nayak was an ardent devotee of the Hindu god Ranganatha right from his boyhood. Achuthappa constructed the golden vimana and gopuras around the Ranganathaswamy Temple, Srirangam and constructed the flight of steps leading to the Cauvery. He constructed Pushyamantapas to feed poor Brahmins in the towns of Mayiladuthurai, Thiruvidaimarudur, Kumbakonam and Tiruvadi. He also constructed a dam across the Cauvery near the town of Tiruvadi in order to facilitate irrigation and endowed agraharas all over the kingdom.

Literature flourished during his reign. The works Sahityaratnakara and Raghunathabyudayam give a detailed picture of life in the Thanjavur Nayak kingdom. They describe the whole kingdom as a "paddy forest" (Salivanam).

== Later life ==
According to sources, Achuthappa abdicated following the death of the Vijayanagar Emperor Venkatapathi in 1614 and anointed his son Raghunatha Nayak as the next ruler. According to the Sahityaratnakara, Achuthappa retired to Srirangam upon abdication spending the rest of his life discoursing with Hindu scholars. The Raghunathabyudayam says that Raghunatha Nayak approached Achuthappa to seek his blessings after the Battle of Toppur in 1617. It is assumed that Achuthappa must have died after that date.

Achuthappa Nayak Nayaks of Thanjavur
Preceded by Sevappa Nayak	Raja of Thanjavur; 1560-1614	Succeeded by Raghunatha Nayak
