= Vijaya Raghava Nayak =

Nayak of Thanjavur from 1634 to 1673

Vijaya Raghava Nayak (also Vijayarāghava Nāyaka, 1590s–1673) was the fourth and last king of Sevappa Nayak's line. He ruled from 1634 to 1673. In 1673, Vijaya Raghava Nayak was defeated in battle by the Madurai Nayak king Chokkanatha Nayak who captured and beheaded him.

== Personal life ==
Vijaya Raghava Nayak was the eldest son of Raghunatha Nayak. He held the titles "Mannaru Dasa" and "Sahitya Raya". He ascended the throne in 1634 on the death of his father and predecessor. He had son called Sengamaladas who ruled thanjavur under the help of Maratha king Ekoji, then he was chased away from his kingdom.

== Patronage of art and music ==
Like his father Raghunatha Nayak, Vijaya Raghava Nayak was also a patron of art and music. He composed the Telugu poems Raghunāthābhyudayam and Raghunāthanāyakabhyudayamu in praise of his father.

== Death ==
The end of the Thanjavur Nayak dynasty was brought on by Chokkanatha Nayak, the Nayak of Madurai. The dispute was due to the refusal of Vijaya Ragava to give his daughter in marriage to Chokkanatha Nayak. Chokkantha determined to fetch the maiden by force back into their capital, successfully stormed the Thanjavur palace in 1673 after flattening much of the fort walls by cannons. But Chokkanatha was thwarted in his attempts by Vijaya Ragava, when he, in a gruesome act of defiance, blew up his daughter and all the other ladies of the palace. He then charged at the attacking army with his son and his body-guard. He was captured after a brief fight, and was beheaded by the Madurai General Samukham Venkata Krishnappa Nayak

== See also ==
- Siege of Trichinopoly (1660)

== Notes ==
Vijaya Raghava Nayak Nayaks of Thanjavur
Preceded by Raghunatha Nayak	Raja of Thanjavur; 1634-1673	Succeeded by Alagiri Nayak
