= Thanjavur Nayak kingdom =

Kingdom in Thanjavur, Tamil Nadu (1532–1673)

Thanjavur Nayak Dynasty
- 1532–1673
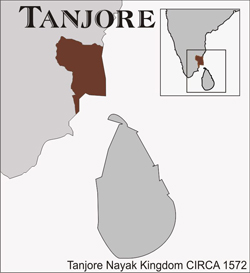
- Approximate extent of the Thanjavur Nayaka Dynasty c. 1572
- Capital: Thanjavur
- Common languages: Telugu, Tamil
- Religion: Hinduism
- Government: Monarchy
- King
- History
  - Established: 1532
  - Disestablished: 1673
Preceded by	Succeeded by
Chola Empire; Vijayanagara Empire	Thanjavur Marathas

The Thanjavur Nayak Dynasty, established by Sevappa Nayaka around 1532, was a ruling lineage that governed Thanjavur between 16th and 17th centuries. Hailing from Telugu Balijas ancestry, the Nayaks were initially appointed as provincial governors by the Vijayanagara Emperor in the early 16th century, alongside governorships based at Madurai, and Gingee. They governed with increasing autonomy following the decline of central Vijayanagara authority after 1565. They became known for their extensive architectural and literary patronage in Tamil, Telugu and Sanskrit.

== Origins ==
The family traced its lineage to Balija merchant-warrior communities originating in the Telugu country (present-day Andhra Pradesh). Epigraphical studies by archaeologist Kudavayil Balasubramanian identified the dynasty as members of Kavarai community. A 1556 CE inscription at Arunachalesvara Temple in Tiruvannamalai identifies the founder's father, Timmappa Nayaka, as a member of Kavarai community, also noting that his son Sevappa Nayaka governed Thanjavur. Kavarai is the traditional Tamil designation for Telugu-speaking Balijas settled in Tamil Nadu. The deity Rajagoplaswamy (locally known as Mannaru) at the Mannargudi temple was their kula deivam (tutelary family deity).

== Literature and arts ==
Court patronage under the Thanjavur Nayaks saw a distinct literary tradition known in historiography as the Southern School of Telugu Literature, as well as they became known for their extensive literary patronage in Tamil and Sanskrit. The Royal court supported poets, dramatists, musicians, and Sanskrit scholars (pandits), with several rulers composing works themselves.

Raghunatha Nayaka (r. 1600-1634) was an accomplished scholar and a poet both in Telugu and Sanskrit. In Telugu, he composed the kavyas Valimiki Charitramu, Parijatapaharanamu, and Rukmini Parinaya Yakshaganamu. In Sanskrit, his court produced musical treatises Sangita Sudha (attributed to Raghunatha and his minister Govinda Dikshitar) and Bharata Sudha. The court also had notable female literary figures, including Ramabhadramba, who wrote the historical Sanskrit kavya Raghunathabhyudayam, and the poet Madhuravani, who translated Raghunatha's Telugu Andhra Ramayana into Sanskrit.

The reign of his successor, Vijaya Raghava Nayak (r. 1634-1673), popularized the Yakshagana theatrical genre that combined verse, song and rhythmic prose. He authored over thirty Yakshagana plays—including Raghunathanayakabhyudayamu and Usha Parinayamu. His court poet Chengalva Kalakavi composed the prabandha Rajagopla Vilasamu. Classical Tamil works and commentaries were also copied and preserved which laid the foundation for the palm-leaf manuscript collections later in the Saraswathi Mahal Library.

== History ==
Following the collapse of the Chola Empire in 1279, Thanjavur passed to the Pandyas and later to Vijayanagara Empire during the late 14th century. In 1532 CE, Achyuta Deva Raya—successor to Krishnadevaraya of the Vijayanagara Empire—granted regional governor Sevappa Nayaka permission to establish a hereditary feudatory kingdom.

=== Sevappa Nayaka (1532–1580) ===
Sevappa Nayaka (r. 1532–1580) was the founder of the Thanjavur Nayak kingdom. He was the son of Timmappa Nayaka (also known as Timmabhupati), a Vijayanagara provincial commander in the Arcot region, and his wife Bayyambika. Genealogical details recorded in Raghunathabhyudayam and local epigraphs trace the family's ancestral seat to Nedungunram in North Arcot. The epigraphs of all of the Tanjore Nayaks show that they belonged to Nedungunram. An inscription of Emperor Krishnadevaraya records that Timmappa served as royal door-keeper (vasal) and as a military commander (dalavay) during the Raichur campaign of 1520. Historian V. Vriddhagirisan identifies Timmappa as the brother of Nagama Nayaka, the father of Vishwanatha Nayaka (founder of the Madurai Nayaks), establishing Viswanatha and Sevappa as first cousins.

Sevappa married Murtimamba, the sister of Vijayanagara queen Tirumalamba and sister-in-law of Achyuta Deva Raya. Various historians suggest that Thanjavur was bestowed as Stridhana (marital gift) in connection with this union. Sevappa had also served as the emperor's personal betel-bearer (adaiappan or thambul karandivan), which was an intimate position customarily reserved for trusted family members.

His civic and architectural works included the construction of prakaras (enclosure walls) at the Vridhachalam and Kanchipuram temples, gilding the Vimanas of temples at Srisailam and Thirumala (Tirupati) with gold, construction of the eastern gopuram of the Annamalaiyar Temple at Tiruvannamalai, and repairing the Sivaganga Fort and the tank at Thanjavur.

=== Achuthappa Nayaka (1560-1614) ===
Sevappa was succeeded by his son, Achuthappa Nayaka (r. 1560–1614), named after Emperor Achyuta Deva Raya. Achuthappa functioned as a co-regent (yuvaraja) with his father until 1580. After ascending the throne in 1580, he ruled jointly with his son and heir, Raghunatha Nayaka. His administration was guided by his prime minister, Govinda Dikshitar.

==== Military campaigns and foreign relations ====
After the defeat of the Vijayanagara army at the Battle of Talikota (1565), the capital was re-established at Penukonda and later at Chandragiri under the Aravidu dynasty. Later when the Nayaks of Madurai and Gingee withheld tribute, Achuthappa maintained loyalty to Aravidu emperors Sriranga I and Venkata II. This loyal alignment led to armed conflict with Madurai. At the Battle of Vallamprakara, Thanjavur troops, allied with Aravidu imperial troops, defeated the army of Virappa Nayaka of Madurai. Elsewhere, along the coastline, when Portuguese incursions threatened the Jaffna Kingdom in northern Ceylon, the king of Jaffna sought military assistance from Thanjavur.

==== Infrastructure and temple patronage ====
Achuthappa Nayak was deeply religious and he directed significant funds to temple architecture and irrigation infrastructure. At the Ranganathaswamy Temple at Srirangam, he funded the northern and western Gopurams, the eighth prakara wall, several pillared halls, gilded the central sanctum's vimana, and presented the murti of God studded with Crown jewels. He constructed riverfront pavilions (pushya-mandapas) along the Kaveri at Mayiladuthurai, Thiruvidaimarudur, Thiruvaiyaru, and Kumbakonam. He endowed village land revenues to temple trusts in Tiruvidaimarudur and Chidambaram.

In agriculture, he commissioned a masonry barrage across the Kaveri River near Thiruvaiyaru to improve canal water distribution. He also established several Agraharams across the Kaveri delta region. Towards the end of his reign, dynastic succession disputes broke out in the royal court at Vellore, which drew the southern Nayak kingdoms into active war.

=== Raghunatha Nayaka (1600–1634) ===
Raghunatha Nayaka (r. 1600–1634) expanded the political influence and cultural impact of the kingdom. Early in his reign, he provided military support to Emperor Venkata II to counter incursions by Sultanate of Golconda. In 1620, Raghunatha concluded a treaty with the Danish East India Company permitting them to establish a trading post and Fort Dansborg at Tarangambadi (Tranquebar). This encouraged the English to seek trade with the Thanjavur Nayaks. Mettalurgical collaboration with the Danish engineers led to the casting of the massive forged-iron Thanjavur cannon (the Raghunatha cannon), which was mounted on the eastern ramparts of the city fort.

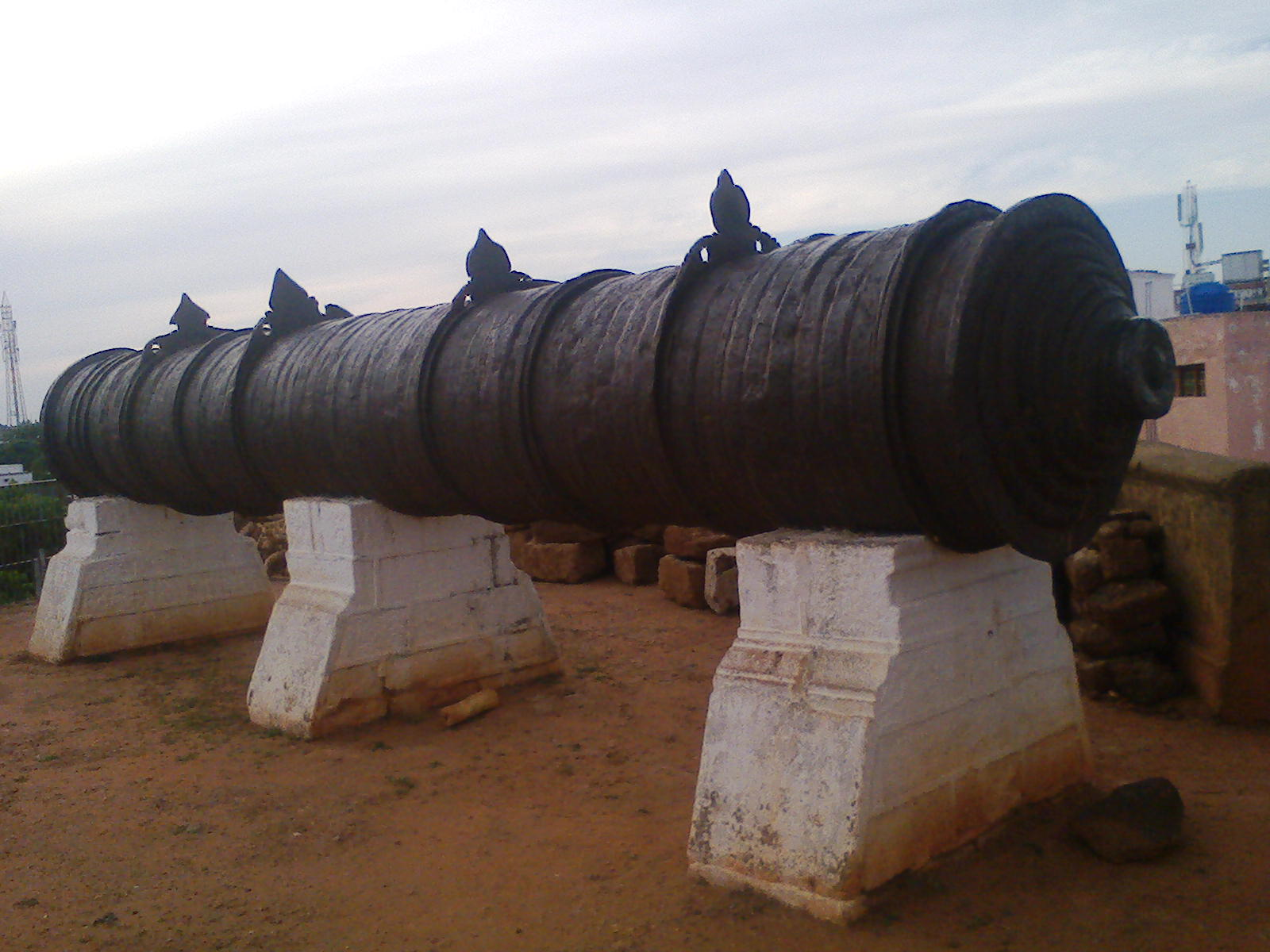
Thanjavur cannon installed during Raghunatha's reign

Raghunatha was an active author and musical theorist in Sanskrit, Kannada and Telugu languages. His court included female literary figures such as Ramabhadramba and Madhuravani, along with Dvaita philosophers Sudhindra Tirtha and Raghavendra Tirtha. The biographical kavya Sahitya Ratnakara, composed by Govinda Dikshita's son Yajnanarayana, has detailed accounts of Raghunatha's reign and military expansions. In music, Raghunatha authored the Sanskrit treatise Sangita Sudha (in collaboration with Govinda Dikshitar), and introduced new raagas and talas, including Jayantasena and Ramananda, Sargita vidya and Raghunatha (Mela). His Telugu literary compositions include Valmiki Charitramu, Parijatapaharanamu, Achyutendrabhyudayam, Gajendramoksham, Nala Caritiam, and dance-drama Rukmini Krishna Vivaha Yakshagana.Manuscripts of works authored by his court scholars were catalogued in the royal library (Sarasvati Bhandar). This laid the foundation for the modern Saraswati Mahal Library developed further under Thanjavur Marathas (Serfoji II).

==== Civil war and the Battle of Toppur ====
Ater the death of Emperor Venkata II in 1614, a succession dispute broke the Vijayanagara Empire. The rebel faction led by Gobburi Jagga Raya executed Emperor Sriranga II and his family in Vellore prison, supporting their putative son as claimant to the throne. The loyalist general Yachama Nayaka of Kalahasti smuggled Sriranga's surviving son, Rama Deva Raya, out of captivity and sought assistance from Raghunatha. Jagga Raya formed an alliance with the Nayak of Gingee and Muttu Virappa Nayaka of Madurai.

In late 1616, the opposing coalitions met at the Battle of Toppur. They fought on an open plain along the northern banks of the Kaveri River between Tiruchirappalli and Grand Anicut. Seventeenth-century Jesuit accounts, like those of Manuel Barradas, described the battle as one of the largest pitched in South Indian history.

The loyalist forces under Raghunatha and Yachama routed the rebel coalition. Jagga Raya was killed in action, the Gingee forces were driven back and Muttu Virappa was forced to yield and retreat. Following the victory, Raghunatha crowned the then fifteen year old Rama Deva Raya as Emperor at Kumbakonam in early 1617.

=== Vijaya Raghava Nayaka (1634–1673) and fall of the dynasty ===
Vijaya Raghava Nayaka (r. 1634–1673) was the final ruler of the Thanjavur Nayak line. He was popularly known by the epithet Mannaru Dasa and had sponsored extensive construction projects at the Rajagopalaswamy Temple in Mannargudi. These included prakaras, gopurams, mandapams and tanks. He had authored over thirty Telugu works—primarily Yakshagana plays. His royal court supported with several vernacular and musical compositions.

Escalating conflicts with Madurai Nayaks ended up in the siege of Thanjavur by Chokkanatha Nayaka in 1673. When the defence of the fort became untenable, he ordered the royal women's quarters blown up with gunpowder to prevent capture. He died in the battle along with his son Chengamala Dasa. Madurai briefly ruled the city till 1675 when the Maratha general Venkoji (Ekoji I) captured Thanjavur, founding the Thanjavur Maratha Kingdom.

== See also ==
- Madurai Nayak dynasty
- Nayaks of Gingee

== Bibliography ==
- Nagaswamy, R Tamil Coins- a study, (1970), State Department of Archaeology, Government of Tamil Nadu
- Vriddhagirisan V, Nayaks of Tanjore, ISBN 8120609964, Reprint Annamalainagar 1942 edn., 1995
- Velcheru Narayana Rao|Rao, David Shulman and Sanjay Subrahmanyam. Symbols of substance : court and state in Nayaka period Tamil Nadu (Delhi; Oxford : Oxford University Press, 1998); xix, 349 p., [16] p. of plates : ill., maps; 22 cm.; Oxford India paperbacks; Includes bibliographical references and index; ISBN 0-19-564399-2.
- Sathianathaier, R. History of the Nayaks of Madura [microform] by R. Sathyanatha Aiyar; edited for the university, with introduction and notes by S. Krishnaswami Aiyangar ([Madras] : Oxford University Press, 1924); see also ([London] : H. Milford, Oxford university press, 1924); xvi, 403 p.; 21 cm.; SAMP early 20th-century Indian books project item 10819.
- The Political Career of E.V. Ramasami Naicker: A Study in the Politics page 79 by I. Vicuvanatan, E. S. Visswanathan
- The Mysore Tribes and Castes by L Anantha Krishna Iyer and H.V Nanjundayya
- Encyclomedia Indica by Jagadish Saran Sharma
- Gazetteer of the Nellore District: Madras District Gazettees - Page 105, Government Of Madras Staff - History - 2004 - 384 pages
- Questioning Ramayana: A South Asian Tradition by Paula Richman
- Literary Cultures in History by Sheldon Pollock
- Castes and Tribes of Southern India by Edgar Thurston and Rangachari
- Caste and Race in India by G.S.Ghurye
- Questioning Ramayanas - by Paula Richman
- The Literary Cultures in History - by Sheldon I Pollock
- Further Sources of Vijayanagara History By K A Nilakanta Sastry
- Penumbral Visions - by Sanjay Subrahmanyam
- "Thanjavur - A Cultural History", Pradeep chakravarthy, Niyogi books
