= Chokkanatha Nayak =

Nayak of Madurai from 1662 to 1682

Nayak of Madurai
- Reign: 1662–1682
- Coronation: 1662
- Predecessor: Muttu Alkadri Nayak
- Successor: Rangakrishna Nayak
- Born: c. 1646; Madurai
- Died: 1682 (aged 35–36); Madurai (present-day Tamil Nadu, India)
- Burial: Madurai
- House: Madurai Nayaks
- Father: Muttu Alkadri Nayak

Kings and Queen Regents of Madurai Nayak Dynasty
- Part of History of Tamil Nadu
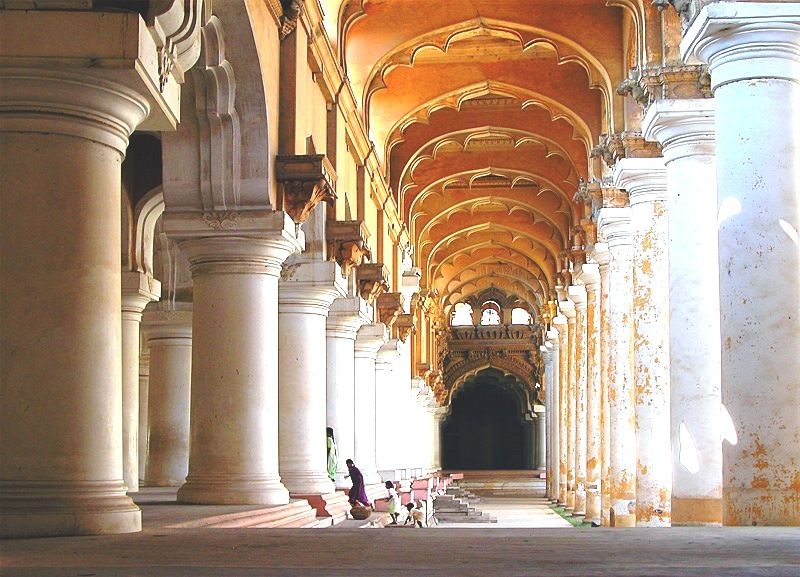

Madurai Nayak rulers
- Viswanatha Nayak: 1529–1563
- Kumara Krishnappa Nayak: 1563–1573
- Joint Rulers Group I: 1573–1595
- Joint Rulers Group II: 1595–1602
- Muttu Krishnappa Nayak: 1602–1609
- Muttu Virappa Nayak: 1609–1623
- Tirumala Nayak: 1623–1659
- Muthu Alakadri Nayak: 1659–1662
- Chokkanatha Nayak: 1662–1682
- Rangakrishna Muthu Virappa Nayak: 1682–1689
- Rani Mangammal‡: 1689–1704
- Vijaya Ranga Chokkanatha Nayak: 1704–1731
- Queen Meenakshi‡: 1731–1736
- ‡ Regent Queens

Capitals
- Madurai: 1529–1616
- Tiruchirapalli: 1616–1634
- Madurai: 1634–1665
- Tiruchirapalli: 1665–1736

Major forts
- Madurai 72 Bastion Fort
- Tiruchirapalli Rock Fort
- Dindigul Fort
- Thirunelvelli Fort

other Military forts
- Namakkal Fort
- Sankagiri Fort
- Attur Fort

Palaces
- Thirumalai Nayak Mahal, Madurai
- Chokkanatha Nayak Palace a.k.a. Durbar Hall, Tiruchirapalli
- Rani Mangammal Tamukkam palace Madurai

Chokkanatha Nayak (1646–1682) was the Nayak of Madurai from 1662 until his death in 1682. He succeeded his father Muttu Alkadri Nayak, as the ruler of the Madurai Nayak dynasty, when he was sixteen years old. In 1660, he successfully warded off Bijapuri and Tanjore's armies in the siege of Trichinopoly. Later in 1663, he lost the same siege of Trichinopoly, and had to pay tributes to Bijapuri and Tanjore, in exchange of keeping his monarchy and also to ensure the safety of Madurai.

He has built a palace called Rani Mangammal Mahal or Kolu Mandapam, which used to be a durbar hall of Madurai Nayaks during the period when Tiruchi was the capital. The building which became a museum in 1998 was scheduled for renovation in 2020 but it was delayed. Later in 2023, the repairs work started.

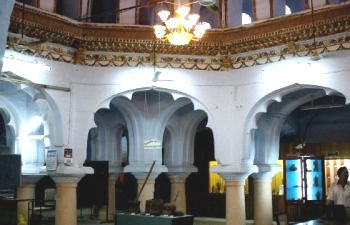
Inside view of Chokkanatha Nayak Palace, Tiruchirappalli
