= Museum of Military History, Vienna =

Museum in Vienna, Austria

Museum of Military History

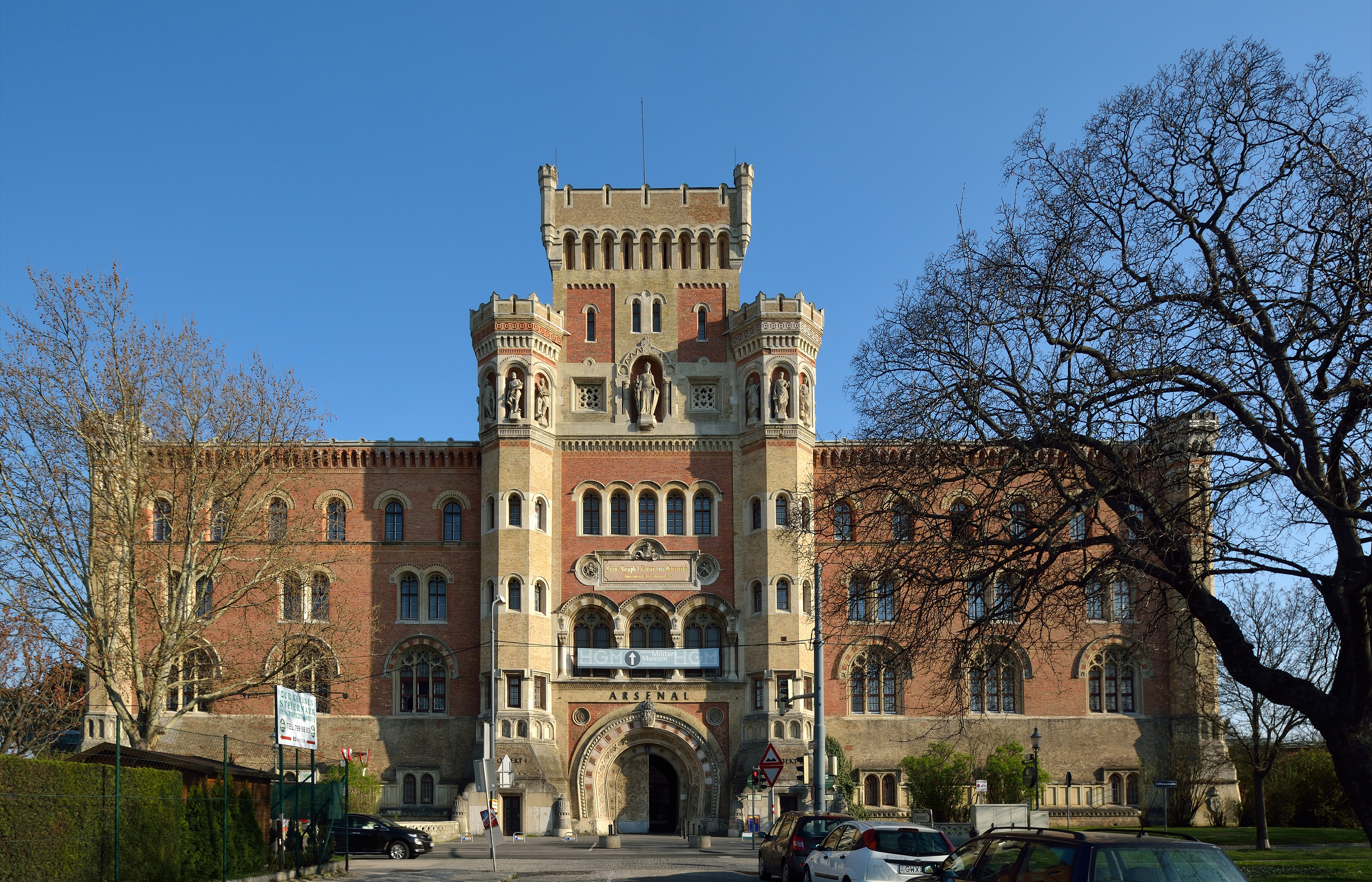

- Location within Austria
- Established: 1869
- Location: Arsenal, Vienna, Austria
- Coordinates: 48°11′3.38″N 16°23′20.17″E
- Visitors: 271,811
- Director: Georg Hoffmann
- Owner: Ministry of National Defence and Sport
- Website: hgm.at

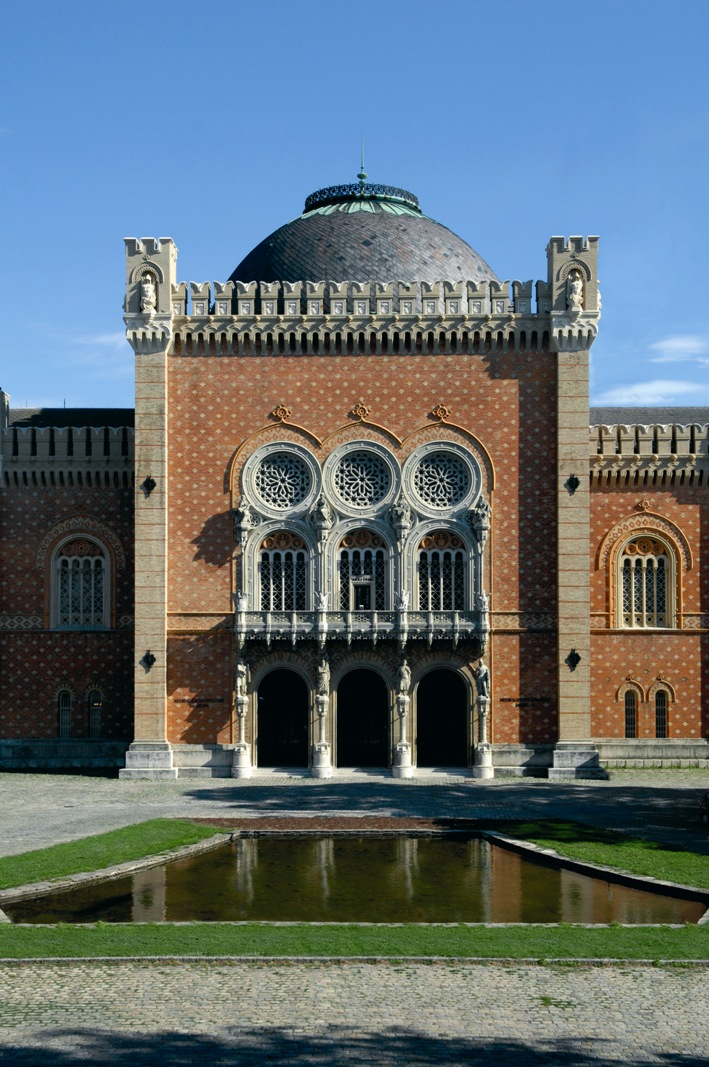
Front of main section

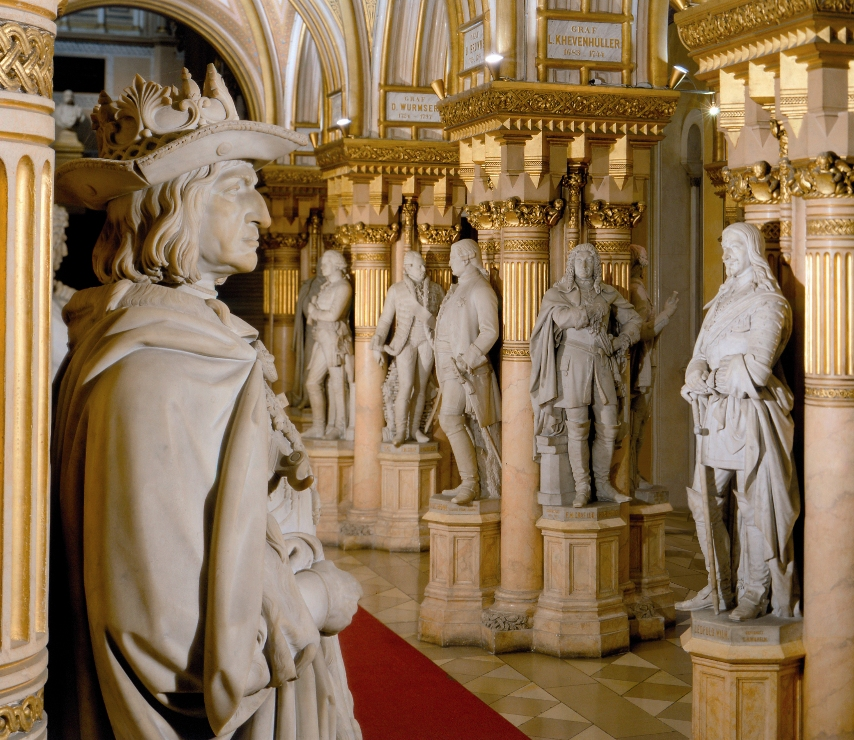
Feldherrenhalle

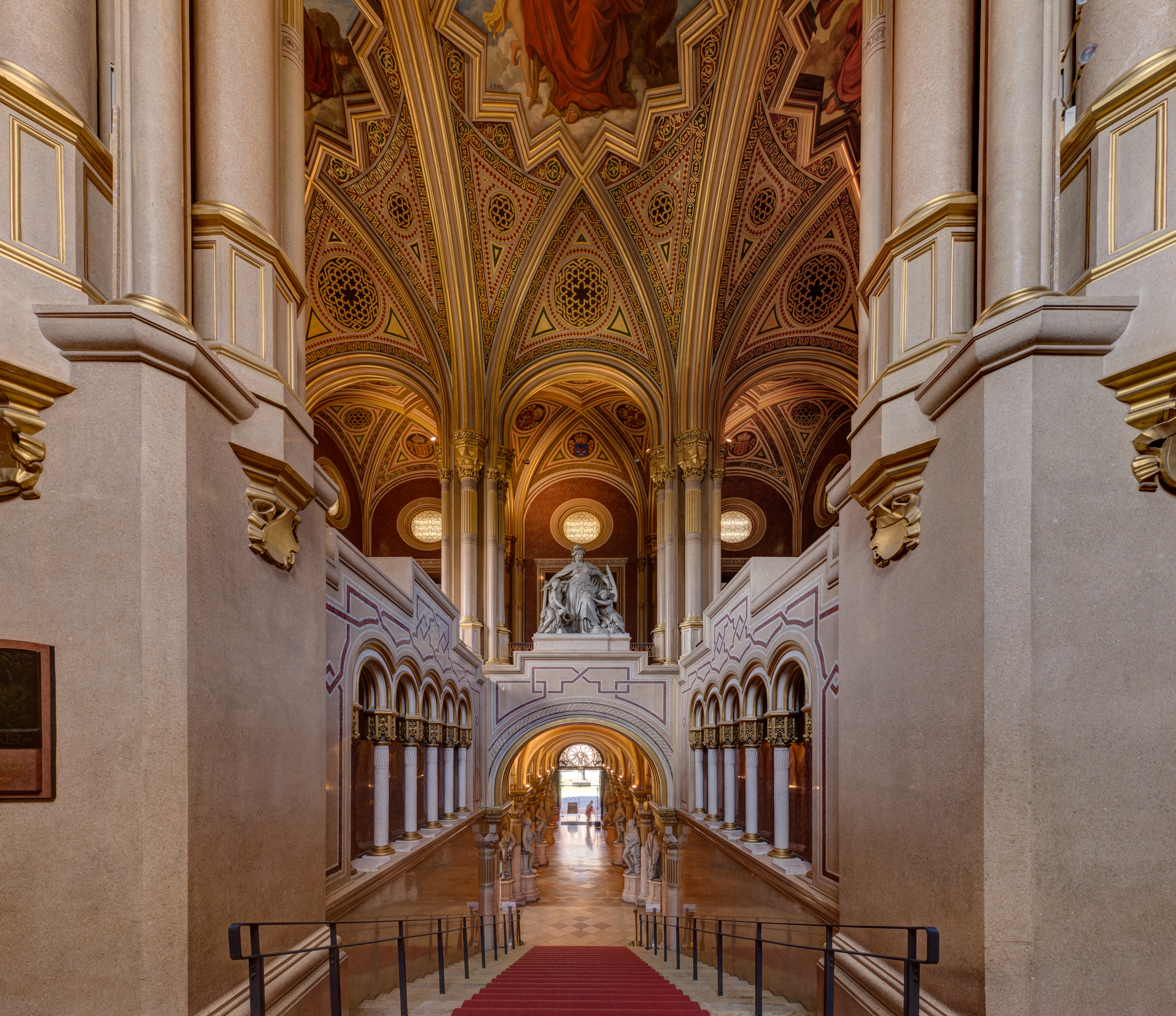
Staircase

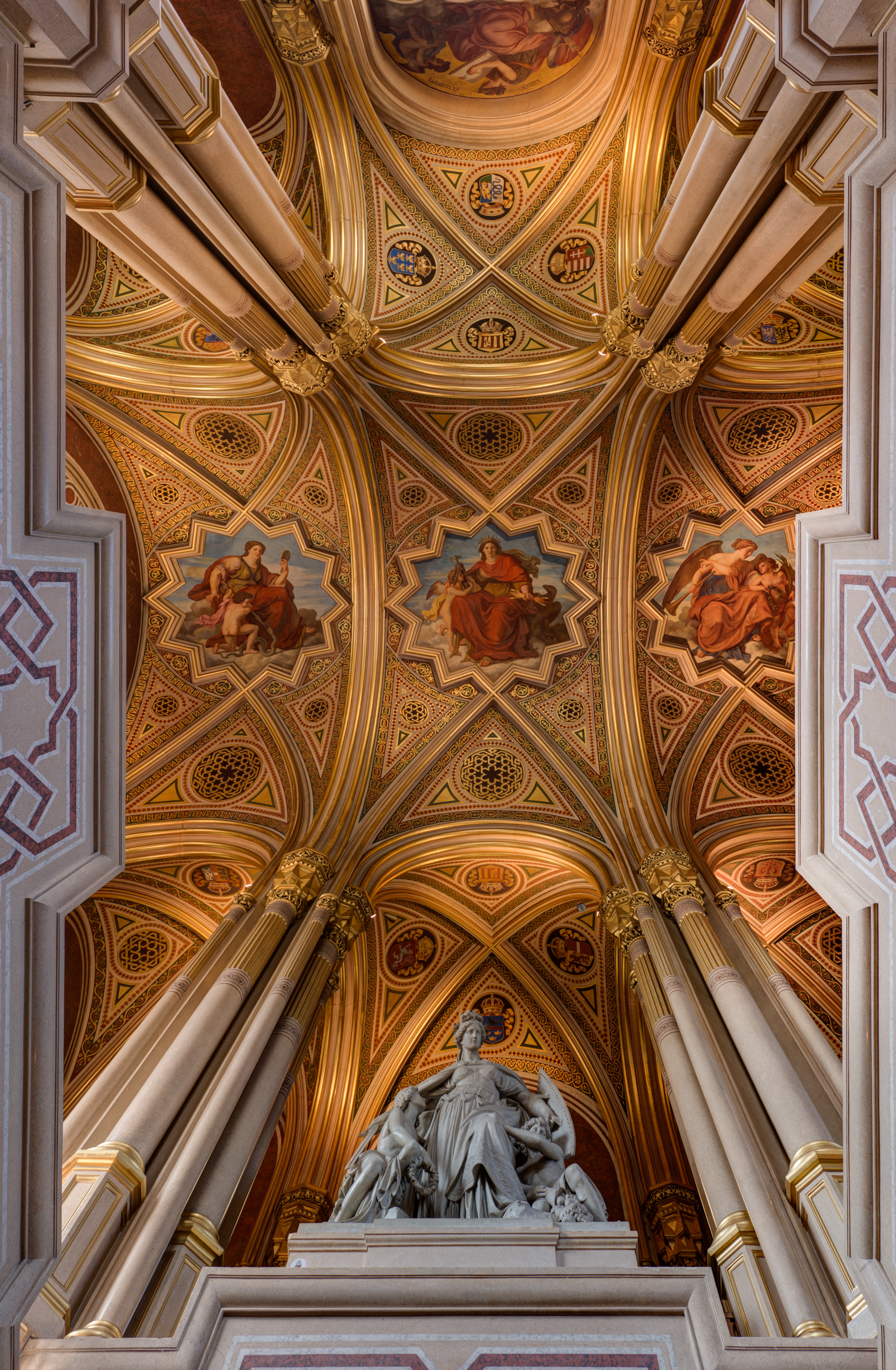
Ceiling works above the staircase

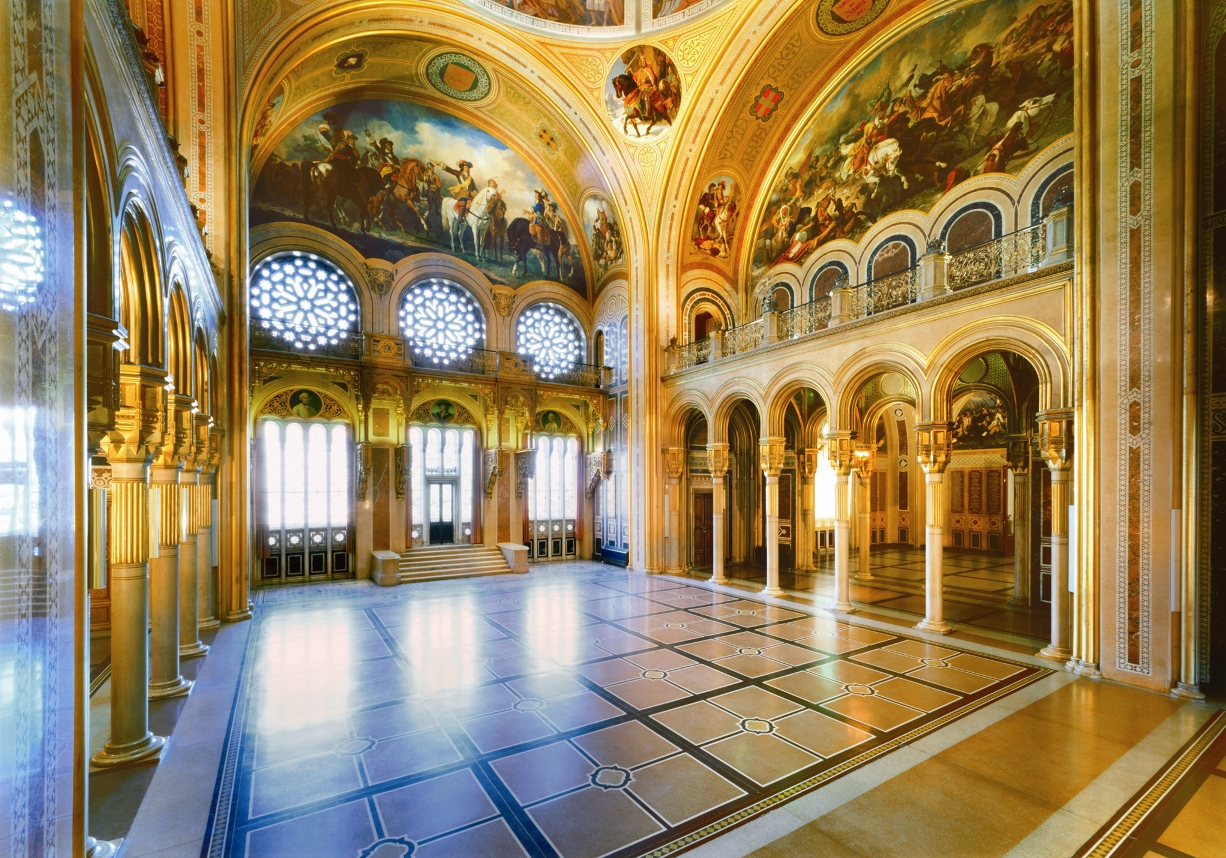
Ruhmeshalle

The Museum of Military History – Military History Institute (German: Heeresgeschichtliches Museum – Militärhistorisches Institut) in Vienna is the leading museum of the Austrian Armed Forces. It documents the history of Austrian military affairs through a wide range of exhibits comprising, above all, weapons, armours, tanks, aeroplanes, uniforms, flags, paintings, medals and badges of honour, photographs, battleship models, and documents. Although the museum is owned by the Federal Government, it is not affiliated with the Federal museums but is organised as a subordinate agency reporting directly to the Ministry of Defence and Sports.

== The museum building and its history ==
The museum building (Arsenal object number 18) is the centrepiece of Vienna's Arsenal, a huge military complex previously consisting of a total of 72 buildings erected in the wake of the 1848/49 revolution. The Arsenal was the largest building project of the young Kaiser Franz Joseph I in his first years of reign, and served to consolidate his neoabsolutist position of power, as opposed to the revolutionary Vienna of 1848. It was Danish architect Theophil Hansen who designed what was then referred to as the weapons museum. The museum was completed on 8 May 1856, just six years after the beginning of construction (15 April 1850), making it the oldest museum building – planned and executed as such – in Austria. At the time of its construction, the Arsenal was located outside the outer ring of fortifications; in 1850, however, the area was incorporated into Vienna along with the original Favoriten (4th District; as of 1874, 10th District; since 1938, the Arsenal forms part of Vienna's 3rd District). Along the south-west side of the Arsenal ran the Vienna-Raab railway, for which the main Vienna station, the Wiener Bahnhof had been opened in 1848.

=== The facade ===
Hansen's plan provided for a 235-meter long building with protruding transverse sections and corner towers, and a tower-like central segment with a square shape, crowned with a dome, with a total height of 43 meters. Just as many other historicist buildings borrowed models from historic architecture, Theophil Hansen chose the Venetian Arsenal, built after 1104, as his prototype. He borrowed Byzantine style elements, adding some Gothic elements in the process. What really stands out is the characteristic brickwork structure. The brickwork, consisting of two-tone bricks, is decorated with terracotta ornaments and wrought iron clasps, the segmentation of the façade is set off in natural stone, and the median risalit is rich with decorative elements such as the three round windows in front of the side wings. The richly adorned attic section is borne by a magnificent lombard band reminiscent of Florentine palazzi. The dovetail crenellation is interrupted by turrets at the axes of the side wings and at the corners of the central part of the building, with terracotta trophy sculptures positioned inside their alcoves. Allegoric representations of military virtues made of sandstone are featured on and in front of the facade, created by Hans Gasser, one of the most influential sculptors of his time. Just below the round windows, the female figures (from left to right) represent strength, vigilance, piety, and wisdom; next to the three openings leading to the lobby are four male figures, which stand for bravery, loyalty to the flag, self-sacrifice, and military intelligence.

=== The interior ===
The interior of the Museum of Military History is witness to the intention of Emperor Franz Joseph to create not just a building to house the imperial arms collections, but above all to establish a magnificent hall of fame and a memorial for the Imperial Army. The Feldherrenhalle, for instance, exhibits 56 full-figure statues of "Austria's most famous warlords and field commanders worthy of eternal emulation", as they are described in the Imperial resolution of 28 February 1863. All statutes are made of Carrara marble and stand equally tall at exactly 186 centimetres. The names and biographical data of those depicted can be found on plates located above each statue, while the base of each statue bears one of the 32 names of the artists who created them, the date it was installed, and the name of the patron who paid for the statue. Half of the costs were borne by Emperor Franz Joseph himself, and the rest was financed by private sponsors who were often descendants of the respective field commanders depicted. The chronological period covered by these statues ranges from the Margrave Leopold I of Babenberg to the Habsburg Archduke Charles.

The staircase too, was lavishly decorated. An additional four statues of field commanders are exhibited in the mezzanine, thus bringing the total to the aforementioned 60, though contrary to the ones in the Feldherrenhalle, these stand in considerably more elevated positions in wall niches. These portray important personalities of the revolutionary year 1848, namely those military leaders who – at times very bloodily – quelled the revolutionary efforts in all parts of the Empire on behalf of the House of Habsburg: Julius von Haynau, Joseph Wenzel Radetzky, Alfred I, Prince of Windisch-Grätz, and Count Josip Jelačić of Bužim. Carl Rahl was assigned with the pictorial decoration of the Staircase, a task he carried out together with his students Christian Griepenkerl and Eduard Bitterlich in 1864. The centre of the gold-ornamented ceiling features frescos with allegorical depictions of power and unity (centre), fame and honour (right), and cleverness and courage (left). The staircase is crowned by an allegorical marble sculpture group titled Austria, created by Johannes Benk in 1869.

Indisputably, the most representative section of the entire museum is the Ruhmeshalle (hall of fame) located in the first floor. A particular highlight of the Ruhmeshalle are the frescos by Karl von Blaas, portraying the most important military events (victories) in Austrian history since the times of the Babenberg dynasty. The four large wall arches show the victories of the Imperial Army, the battle of Nördlingen 1634, the war council at the battle of St. Gotthard 1664, the battle of Zenta 1697, and the relief of Turin 1706; the left adjacent hall contains depictions of events during the reign of Maria Theresia and Joseph II until the siege of Belgrade in 1789; the right adjacent hall contains depictions of the Napoleonic Wars stretching from the battle of Würzburg in 1796 to Tyrol's struggle for freedom in 1809 and the armistice negotiations of field Marshal Radetzky with King Vittorio Emanuele II of Sardinia following the battle of Novara in 1849. The true significance of the Ruhmeshalle, that of a memorial, however, only becomes discernible at the second glance: On the walls of the adjacent halls and in the Ruhmeshalle itself, one will find several marble plaques, bearing the names of over 500 officers (from colonels to generals of the Imperial Army, known as Imperial and Royal (k.u.k.) Army as of the beginning of the Thirty Years' War in 1618 until the end of World War I in 1918), indicating the place and date of their death.

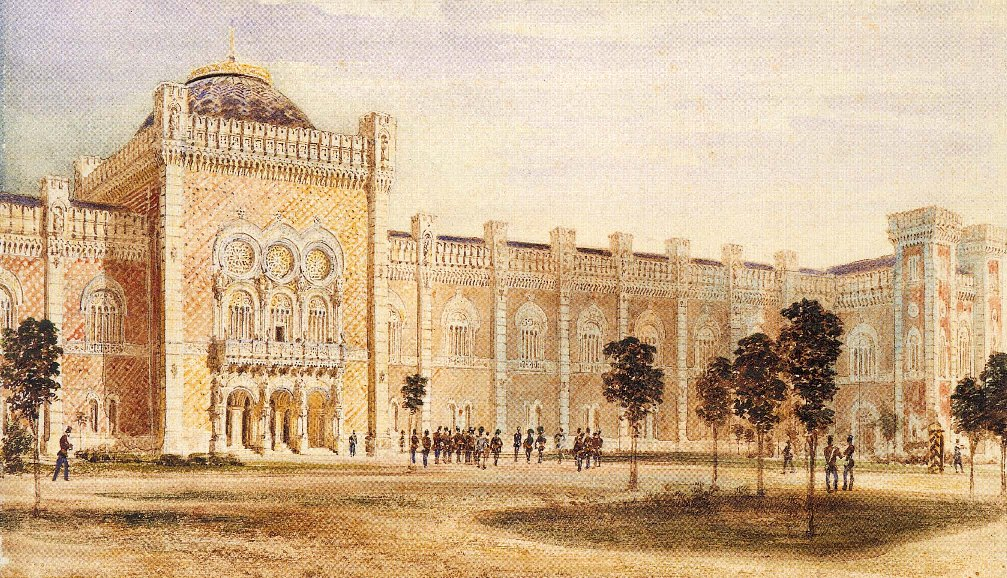
Rudolf von Alt: View of the k.k. Hofwaffenmuseum. Aquarelle, 1857

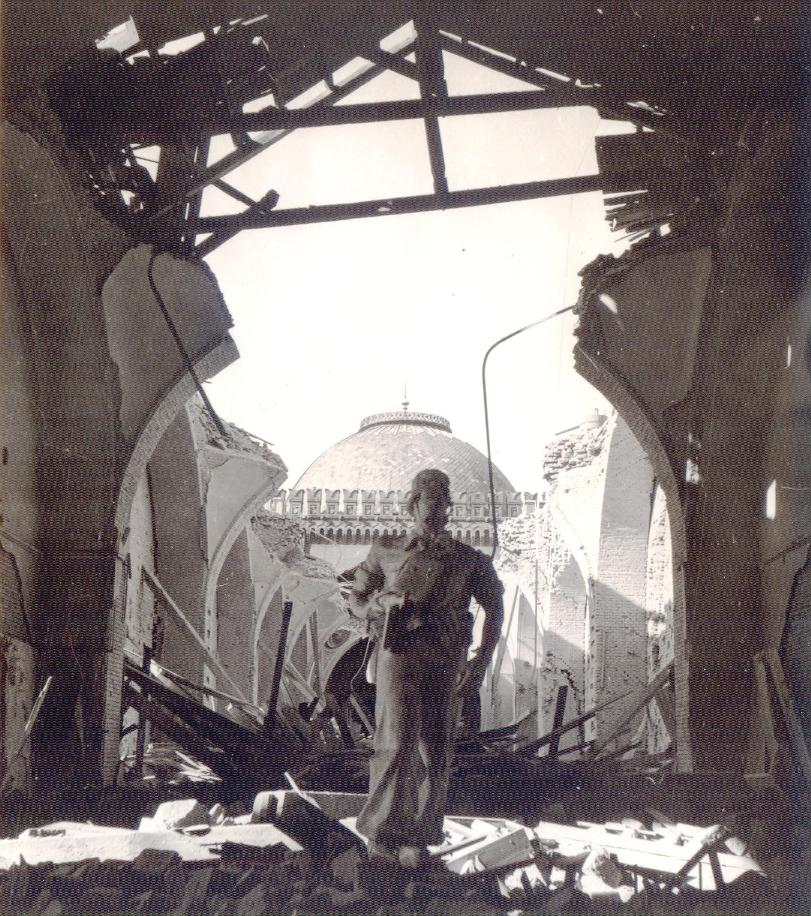
The destruction caused to the north wing by aerial bombardment in 1944

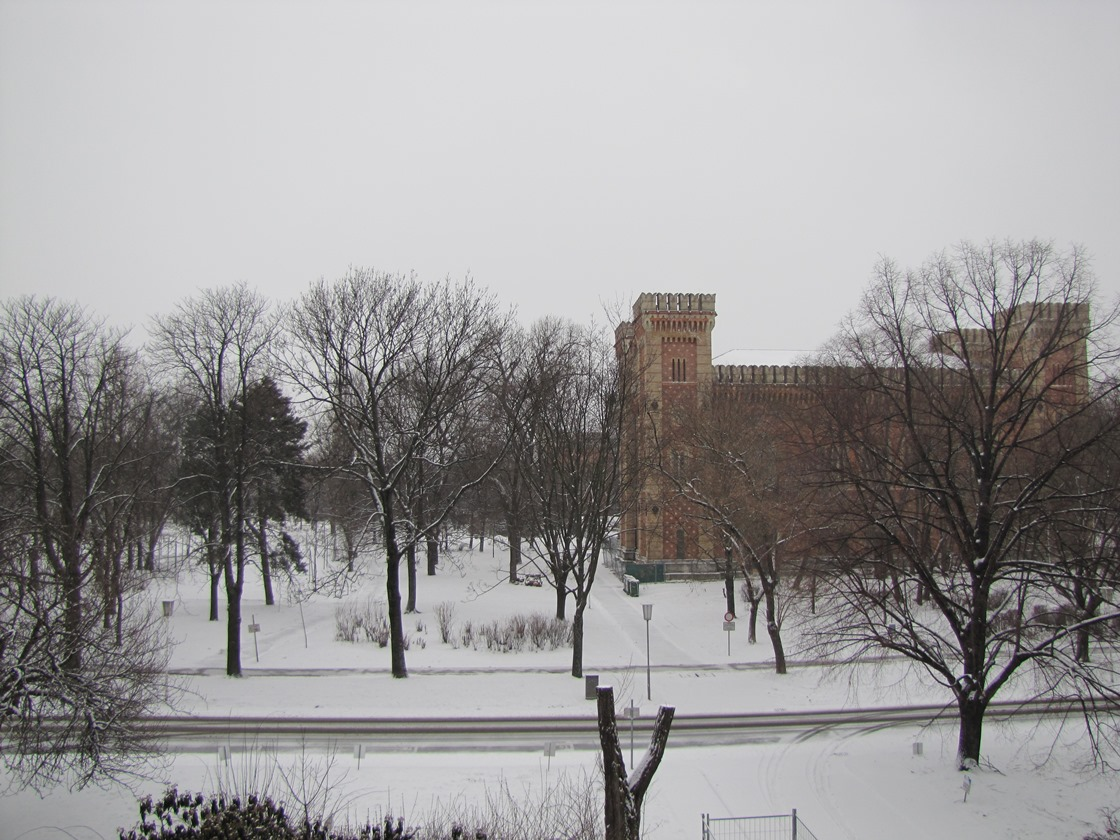
East view of the Heeresgeschichtliches Museum

== History ==
Although the museum building itself was already completed in 1856, work on its interior lasted until 1872. The collection was completed with pieces from the former court arms collection of the Imperial armoury, the Imperial private collection in the Laxenburg Palace, and the Imperial treasury in Vienna. Initially, the collection consisted exclusively of arms and trophies, with a major focus on suits of armour and weapons of the Imperial Leibrüstkammer (Chamber of Personal Armour). After the collection was systematically arranged, it was opened to the public as the k.k. Hofwaffenmuseum in 1869. When construction of the Museum of Fine Arts began in Vienna in 1871 (it was opened in 1891), many believed in the beginning of the 1880s that significant parts of the collections previously exhibited in the Hofwaffenmuseum could be moved there. These considerations brought great uncertainty over the future and orientation of the k.k. Hofwaffenmuseum. Therefore, a committee chaired by Crown Prince Rudolf was formed in 1885, assigned with the task of defining the new orientation of the museum, henceforth called the k.k. Heeresmuseum. From there on, the focus of the collections and exhibitions would be placed on the deeds of the Imperial Army. On the foundation meeting of the committee on 22 February 1885, the Crown Prince underscored the purpose of the museum: He stressed the importance of the museum, which "would contribute to glorifying the nimbus and the honour of the Army, in which the genuine old Imperial spirit lives on, which has held the Imperial position in high esteem at all times and thus constitutes the symbol of cohesiveness of all people". For this reason, he hoped "that the museum would come to life in the greatest possible magnificence″.

The committee consisted of the following members:

- Crown Prince Rudolf of Austria, Protector and Chairman
- Archduke Wilhelm of Austria, Deputy Protector and Chairman
- Quirin Ritter von Leitner, then Director of the Hofwaffenmuseum.
- Alfred Ritter von Arneth, President of the Imperial Academy of Sciences
- Johann Nepomuk Count Wilczek, patron and collector, and main sponsor of the Payer-Weyprecht polar expedition.

Apart from the requests addressed to various military institutions, the committee also approached private civilians to obtain historic objects for the new museum. The principle applied was: The collections were to be divided into war trophies and ″otherwise historically interesting objects of exclusively Austrian origin which are of significance for the proper acknowledgement of the past of the Imperial and Royal Army in all its factors″. Only originals were allowed to be exhibited, and projects and models were admissible only under special circumstances. As a result of the work of the committee and the generous support of the Emperor, his family, the nobility, and the bourgeoisie, as well as the Imperial War Ministry, ″a plethora of treasures was gathered, which a contemporary individual can hardly imagine.″ Finally, on 25 May 1891, the new k.u.k. Heeresmuseum in the Arsenal was inaugurated by Emperor Franz Joseph and dedicated to its intended use.

Once World War I broke out, the museum was immediately closed down for visitors. This was mainly attributed to the fact that so much material was appropriated from the various war theatres that it became impossible to manage an orderly exhibition. The end of the war in 1918 also seemed to bring the final curtain down for the museum. There was even a plan to sell the museum's collections to improve the precarious economic situation, but this was eventually averted. In September 1921, the building was reopened as the Österreichisches Heeresmuseum (Austrian Military Museum). From there on, the museum was to focus primarily on documenting the most recent military events, especially those of World War I. The opening of a gallery for war paintings in 1923 marked the first time that the museum dedicated a large section to fine arts. These did not only depict army chiefs and battles, but also the everyday life of soldiers during wartime.

Following Austria's annexation into the Third Reich, the museum was placed under the management of the director of military museums in Berlin and was renamed to Heeresmuseum Wien (Vienna military museum). During World War II, the museum was once again inaccessible to the public, and admission remained reserved to military personnel. As of 1943, civilians were allowed into the museum as visitors only on weekends. During this time, the museum was primarily used for propaganda purposes. For instance, military campaigns of the Wehrmacht were documented in special propaganda exhibitions (Sieg im Westen (summer 1940), Griechenland und Kreta 1941 – Bild und Beute (March/May 1942) and Kampfraum Südost (summer 1944)). As with all museums in Vienna, the most valuable collections were evacuated once the allied bombing of Vienna began in autumn 1943. These measures proved necessary, since the Arsenal and the Südbahnhof were directly hit by allied bomber groups on 10 September and 11 December 1944, severely damaging or completely destroying not only the museum building but also several depots. Toward the end of the war, in particular during the Vienna offensive, the Arsenal grounds, too, were heavily damaged.

During the occupation, many of the evacuated collection items that had survived the war were requisitioned by the Allies. Several items, however, also fell victim to theft and looting by the soldiers of the Red Army and the civilian population. In the end, the museum faced the prospect of a complete shutdown. Despite the aforementioned difficulties, reconstruction of the museum already began in 1946 under the direction of Alfred Mell, who proposed what was eventually to become its final name, the Heeresgeschichtliches Museum. The management of the museum at the time received particular support from the Austrian Belvedere Gallery and the Museum of Fine Arts. The collection of ship models provided by the Vienna Technical Museum has remained the core attraction of the Marinesaal to this day. During the term of Rudolf Pühringer as director, the museum, now called Heeresgeschichtliches Museum, was reopened by the Federal Minister for Education, Heinrich Drimmel on 24 June 1955.

In the post-war period, the halls of the reopened museum were designed primarily as exhibition areas for trophies (″A cult site and a shrine″). It was not until Johann Christoph Allmayer-Beck became the museum's director in 1965 (through to 1983) that the exhibition areas were comprehensively renovated. The halls for the 16th and 17th century periods, and for the time between 1866 and 1914 were rebuilt and presented in a different design. The purpose was to go beyond the mere display of objects and to scientifically address the topic while thoroughly composing the halls as an artistic synthesis, matching the status of the institution as one of the world's most significant museums. Allmayer-Beck believed that the museum was not a place for maintaining tradition: ″Tradition must be maintained outside - inside, the objective is to make the history of the Austrian and Imperial Army visible - including those often neglected cultural and social elements.″

In September 1998, during the term of Manfried Rauchensteiner as director, the museum opened the Republik und Diktatur hall, which exhibited objects from the period from 1918 until 1945.

On 9 December 2008, the Heeresgeschichtliches Museum was awarded the Austrian Museum Quality Seal, a distinction it received again in 2013. Following two years of construction under director Christian Ortner, the hall group on World War I opened its doors to the public in a modernized and redesigned form on 28 June 2014, just in time for the 100th anniversary of the Assassination at Sarajevo.

== Exhibition ==
The collections of the Heeresgeschichtliches Museum count among the oldest state collections in the city of Vienna. They can be traced back to the collections that had been gathered in the old armoury of the Imperial Army in the Inner City since the 17th century and had already become a much-admired attraction in the 18th century. The museum illustrates the history of the Habsburg monarchy and the fortunes of Austria from the late 16th century until 1945, and various special exhibitions are dedicated to other (sometimes contemporary) themes. The exhibits on display in the tank collection, such as the Kürassier tank destroyer or the M109 self-propelled howitzer include references reaching to the present day. Yet the exhibition items do not only include weapons and military equipment such as the huge medieval cannon Pumhart von Steyr, but also exhibits that trace the path to the war, such as the car in which Archduke Franz Ferdinand, heir to the throne of Austria-Hungary, and his wife Sophie Chotek, Duchess of Hohenberg were murdered on 28 June 1914.

=== Hall I – From the Thirty Years' War to Prince Eugene (16th century–1700) ===
The first hall of the museum is dedicated to the history of Europe in the 16th and 17th century. The Holy Roman Empire, of which Vienna became the capital with Emperor Maximilian I (1508–1519), Emperor Charles V (1519–1556) and Emperor Ferdinand I (1556–1564), was often a theatre of war during this period and was consistently involved in military conflicts over power, confessions, land, and people. The collections of the Museum of Military History begin at a time when military history is undergoing a transformation from the Volksaufgebot (people's volunteer corps) to the standing army. The Imperial armies, which up to the Thirty Years' War were inconsistently equipped and enlisted only for the period of a campaign, were now transformed into a salaried, "standing" army. These armies were primarily financed by field commanders like Albrecht von Wallenstein. One can follow the technical development of firearms from the arquebus of the 16th century to the matchlock, the wheellock, and the flintlock musket. Several suits of armour, batons, and thrusting weapons round off the theme of the Thirty Years' War. A special exhibit is a hand-written letter of Wallenstein to his field Marshal Gottfried Heinrich zu Pappenheim of 15 November 1632, which he wrote on the evening before the battle of Lützen. Pappenheim was to be fatally injured in battle on the next day, carrying the letter on him, to which the large blood stains on the paper bear witness. The collection also includes a ribauldequin from the year 1678, the so-called death organ, which was constructed by the Imperial gun founder Daniel Kollmann, and represents an attempt to manufacture a quick-firing gun for the Imperial Army.

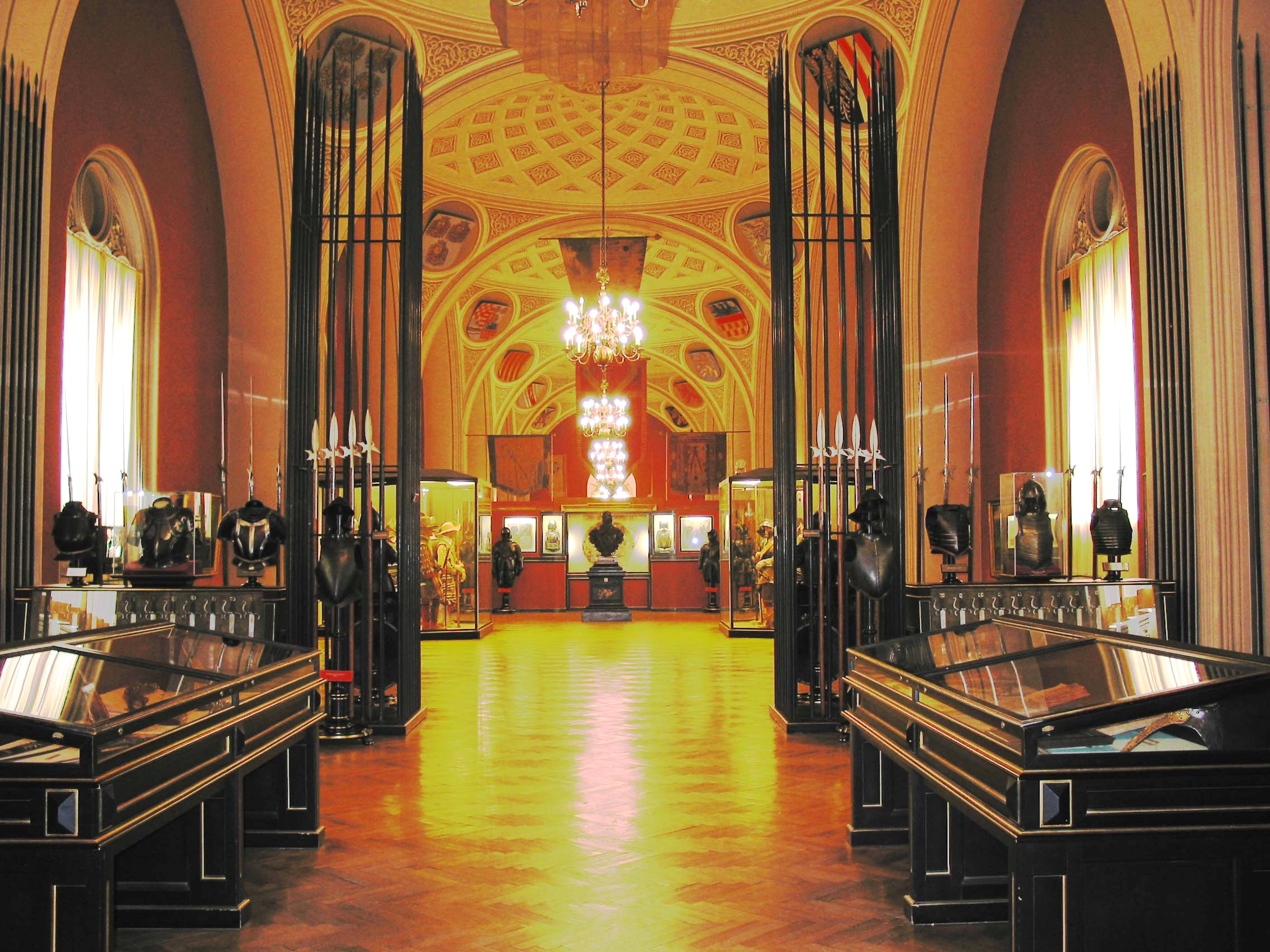
View of Hall I

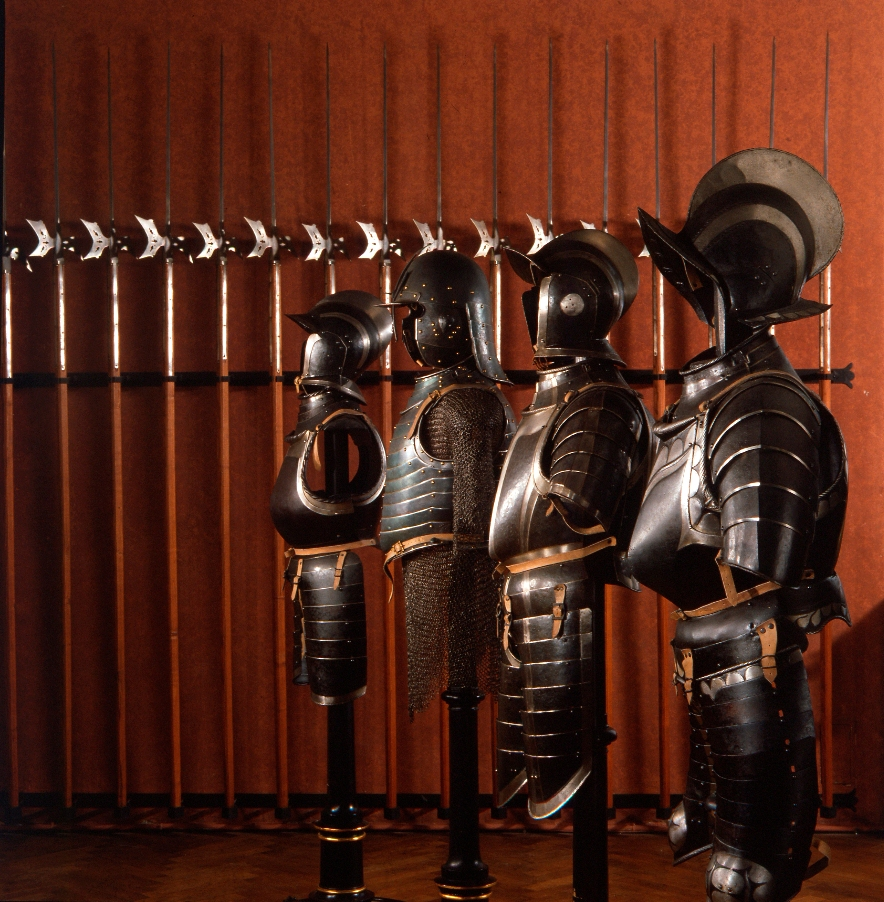
Suits of armour, around 1600

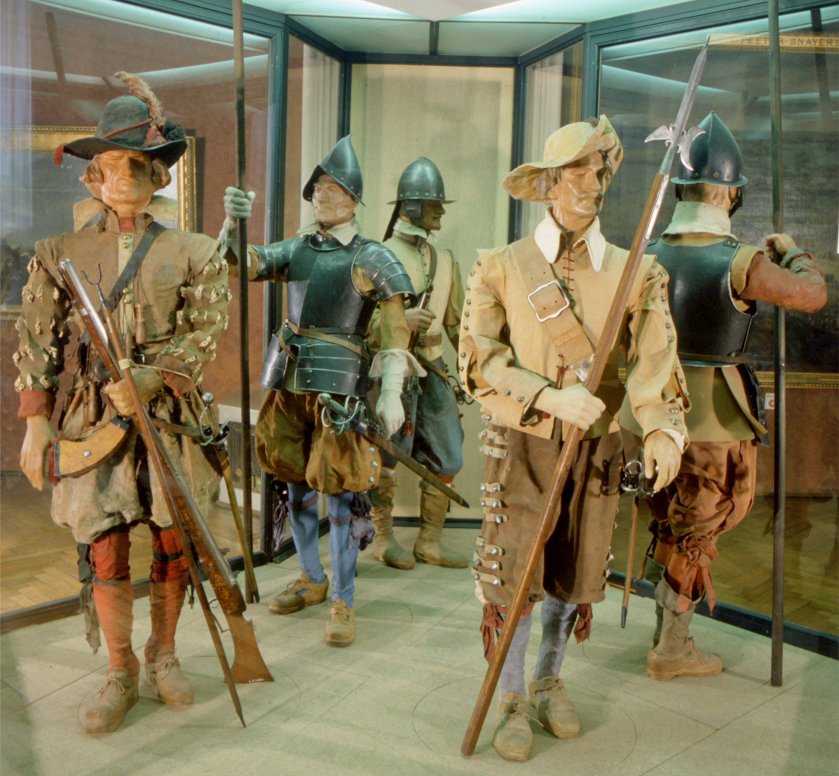
Musketeers and pikemen

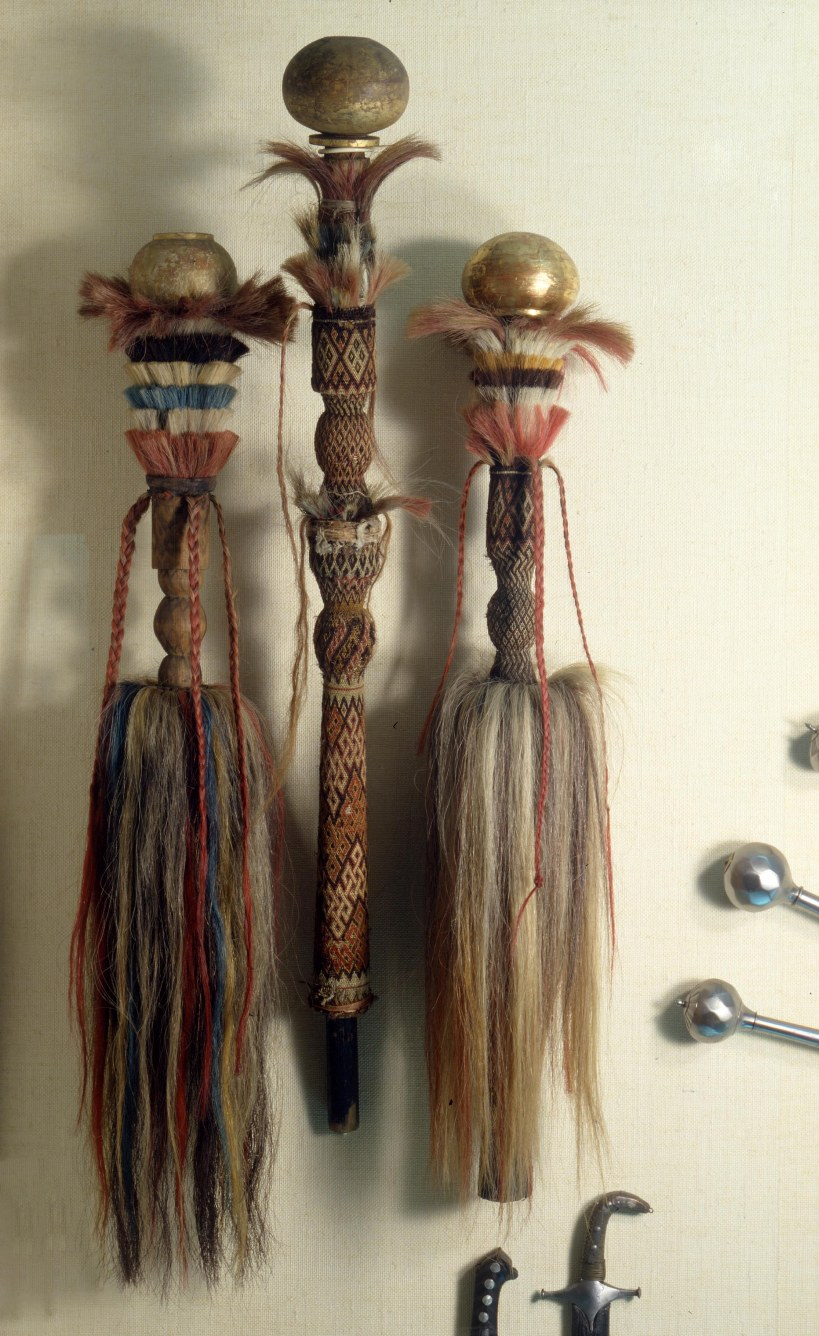
Turkish Tugs

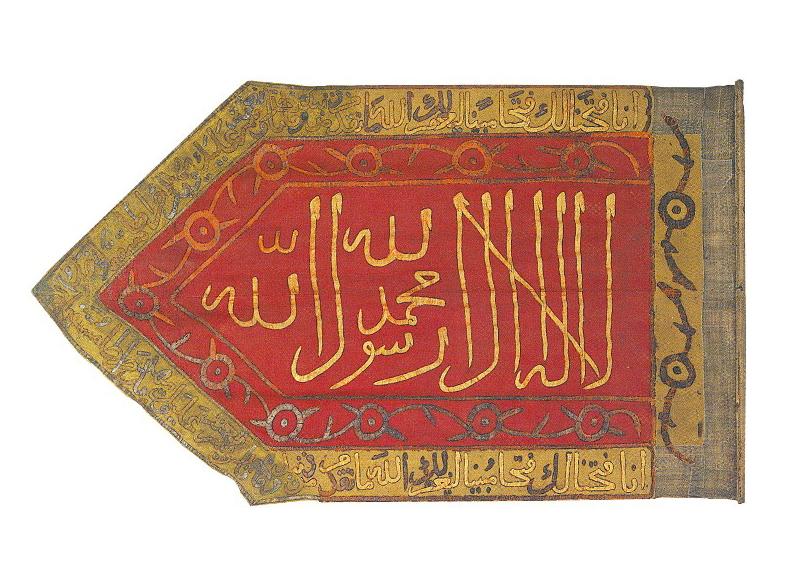
Turkish guidon, 1683

A lot of space is dedicated to the Ottoman Wars, in particular the Second Siege of Vienna in 1683. Several objects of the Ottoman Army are on display, including the reflex bows of the famous Sipahi. Special exhibits include a Turkish mail shirt belonging to the victor of the battle of Mogersdorf, Imperial field commander Raimondo Montecuccoli, a Turkish silver calendar dial, numerous Turkish insignia – including guidons, flags, and horsetails, as well as the seal of the Turkish Sultan Mustafa II, captured by Prince Eugene of Savoy at the battle of Zenta in 1697. The last bay in Hall I is exclusively dedicated to this exceptional field commander and important patron. The exhibits include two of his personal clothing pieces, his cuirass, his baton and sword, and the funeral decoration that was kept after the prince's death in 1736.

=== Hall II – Spanish War of Succession and Maria Theresia Hall (1701–1789) ===
Hall II is dedicated to the 18th century and is also called the Maria Theresia Hall, though the beginning of this section is still dominated by the personality of Prince Eugene and his achievements. The noble knight did not only fight and win in the Ottoman Wars, but also in the Spanish War of Succession. As a consequence of the Great Turkish War, which culminated in the victories of Peterwardein (1716) and Belgrade (1717) and ended with the Treaty of Passarowitz in 1718, the Habsburg monarchy achieved its greatest territorial expansion. The sphere of influence of the Habsburg Empire thus extended over Central and South Eastern Europe, rendering it a major power. Items particularly reminiscent of this period include a Turkish state tent and the ten-pound mortar of Belgrade, which destroyed an entire district of Sarajevo in 1717 with a direct hit on a Turkish gunpowder depot.

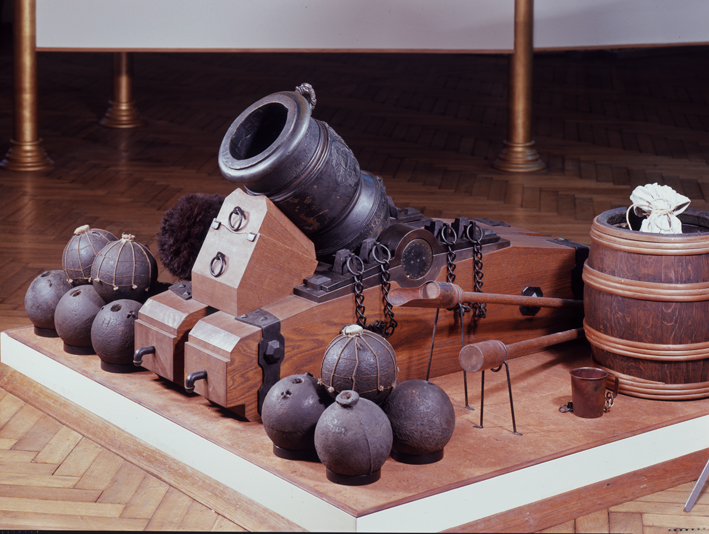
Mortar of Belgrade

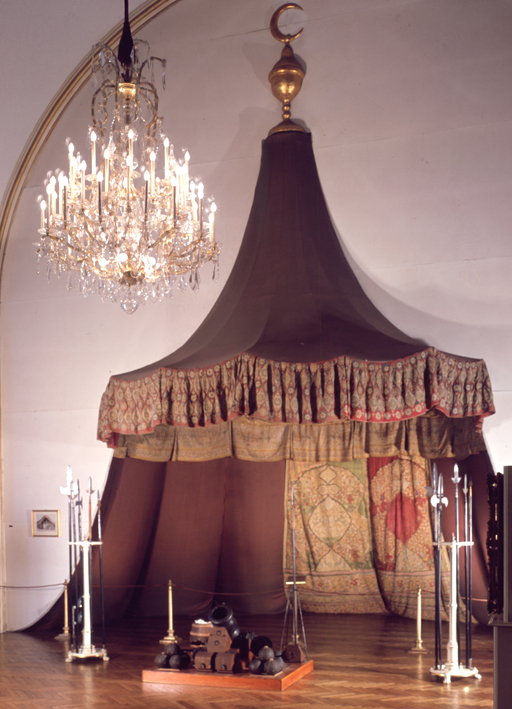
Turkish state tent

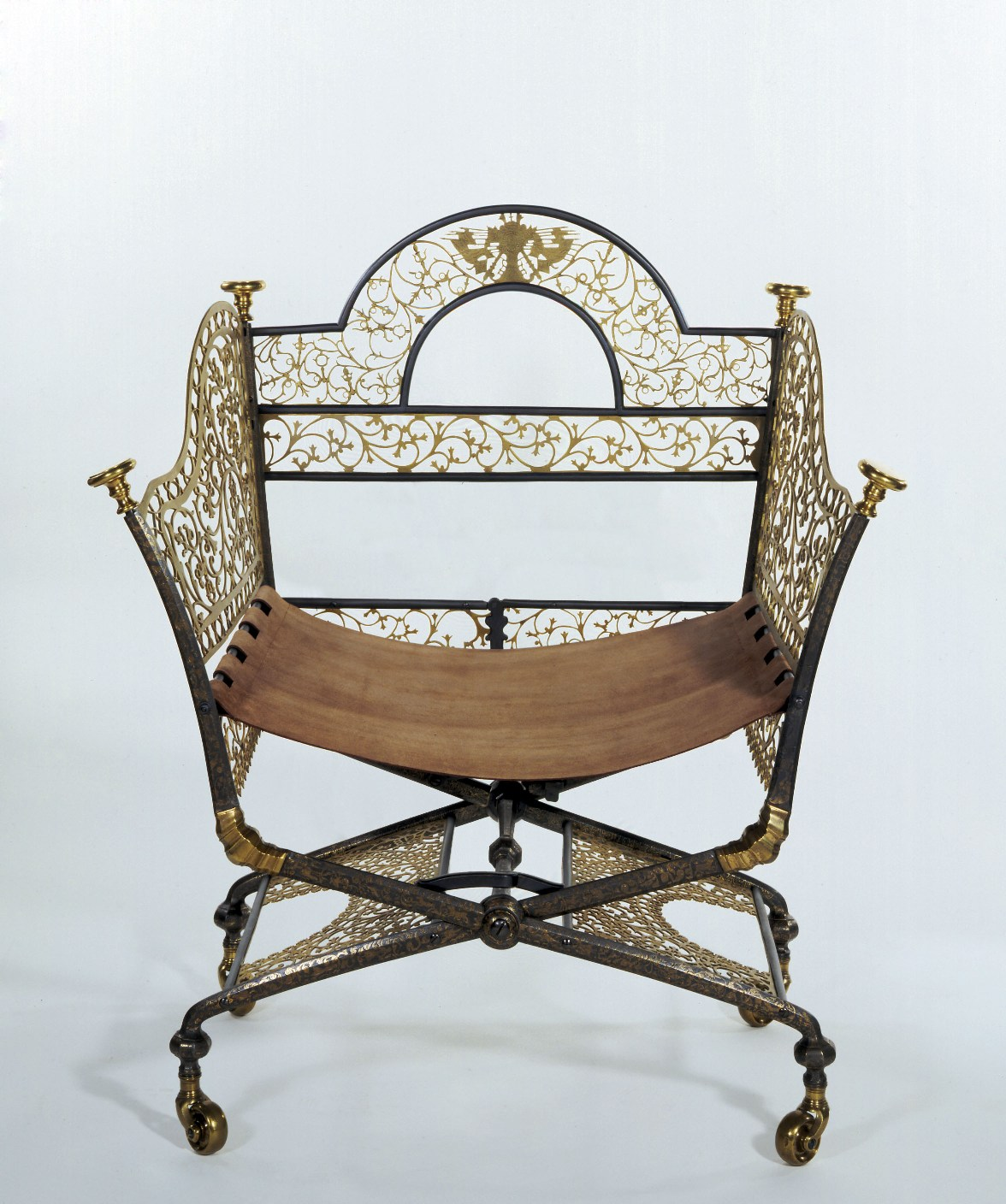
Chair of Empress Elisabeth of Russia

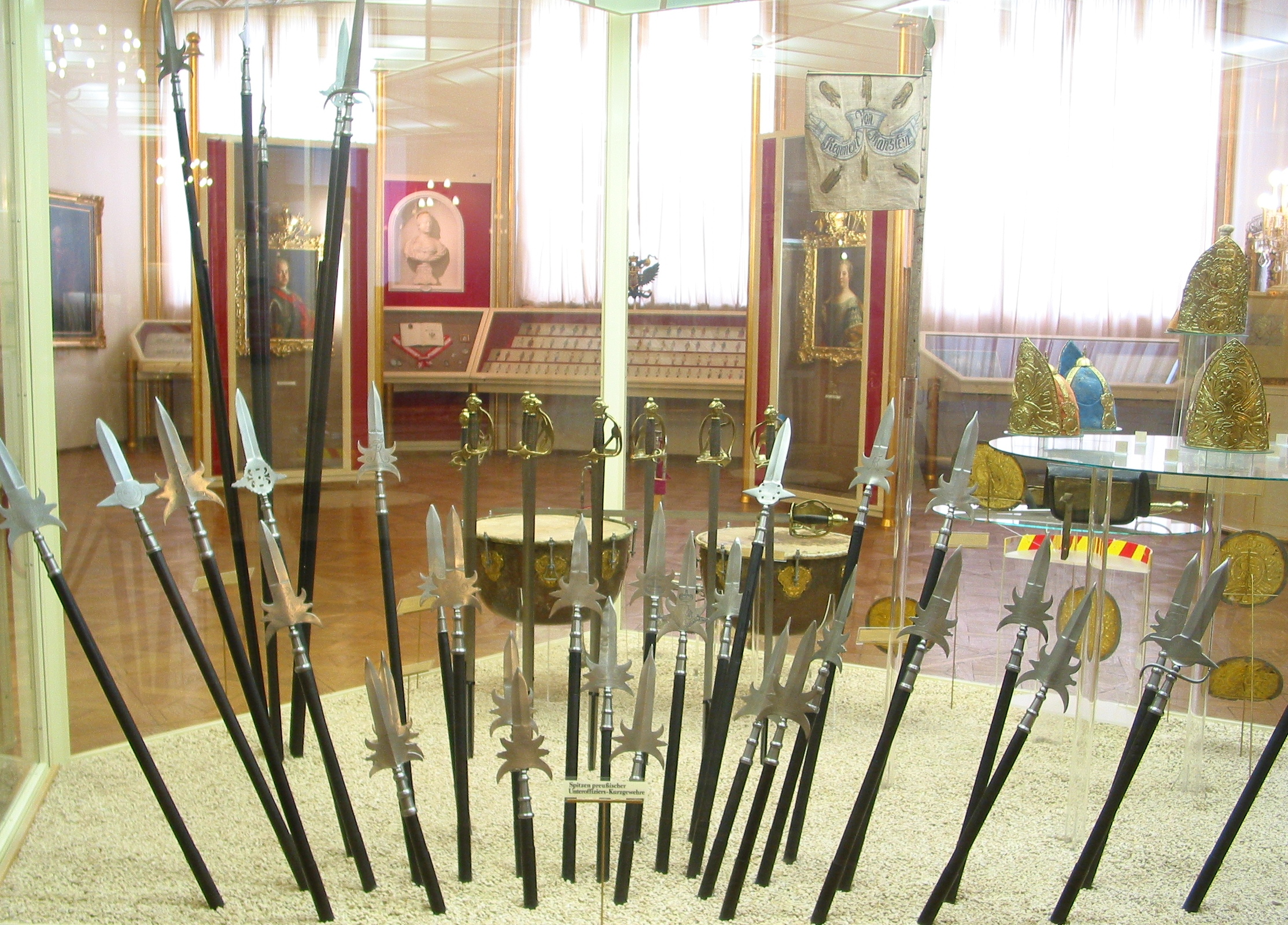
Prussian army

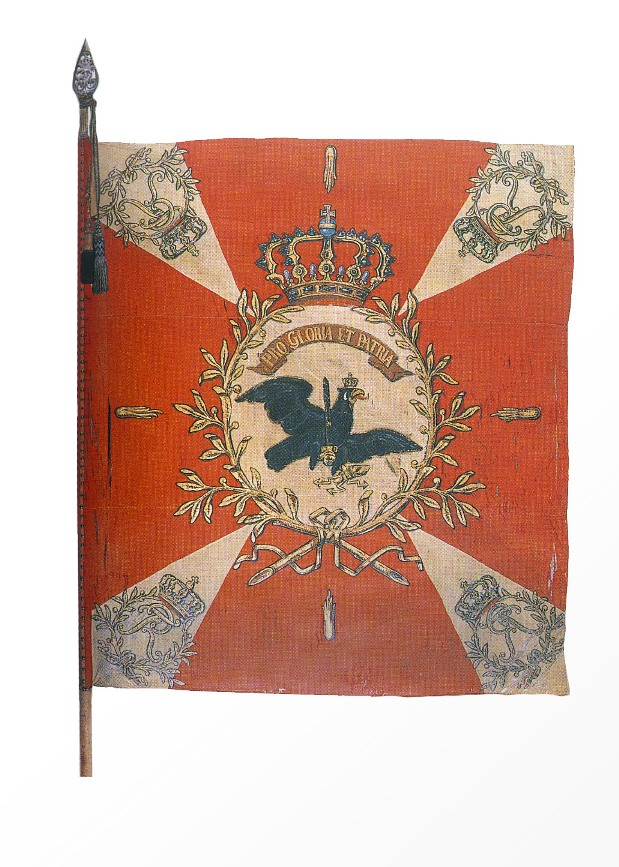
Prussian flag

The death of Prince Eugene in 1736 and of the last male Habsburg, Emperor Karl VI. marked a turning point, which was followed by the reign of Maria Theresia, who was faced with a wide front of enemies from the very beginning. During the Austrian War of Succession, she did not only defend her claim to power but also all the inherited territories against almost all neighbouring countries. At the helm of her enemies was King Friedrich II of Prussia. Although Austria won quite a few of the many battles fought in the so-called three Silesian Wars, this never sufficed for a victory in a decisive confrontation. Several spoils of war such as Fusilier caps, backswords, flags and uniforms serve to document the Austrian and Prussian armies during this period. The personal items of field Marshal Gideon Ernst Freiherr von Laudon are exhibited in a separate display cabinet and include the Maria Theresia Order, Austria's highest military distinction awarded to Laudon for his bravery during the battle of Hochkirch in 1758. On display are also items documenting the establishment of the Theresian Military Academy in 1751, the world's oldest military academy still to be found at its original location.

=== Hall III – Hall of Revolutions (1789–1848) ===
Emperor Joseph II fought the last Ottoman War of the Habsburg monarchy together with the Russian troops of Empress Catherine II of Russia. This conflict, too, ended with the capture of Belgrade in 1789, at the moment when revolution broke out in France, heralding the downfall of the French monarchy. King Louis XVI and his wife Marie Antoinette lost their throne and their lives during the revolution. At the same time, however, began the rise of the man who would dramatically transform Europe's political map: Napoleon Bonaparte. The Hall of Revolutions is dominated by the battles of Austerlitz, Würzburg, Aspern, Deutsch-Wagram, and Leipzig, and by the Tyrolean Rebellion of 1809 led by Andreas Hofer. A highlight of the exhibition is the world's oldest remaining military aircraft, the French war balloon "L' Intrépide", captured by Austrian troops at the battle of Würzburg on 3 September 1796. The large paintings by Johann Peter Krafft (Archeduke Karl and his staff at the battle of Aspern and Victory declaration in the battle of Leipzig) impressively illustrate the events of these turbulent times.

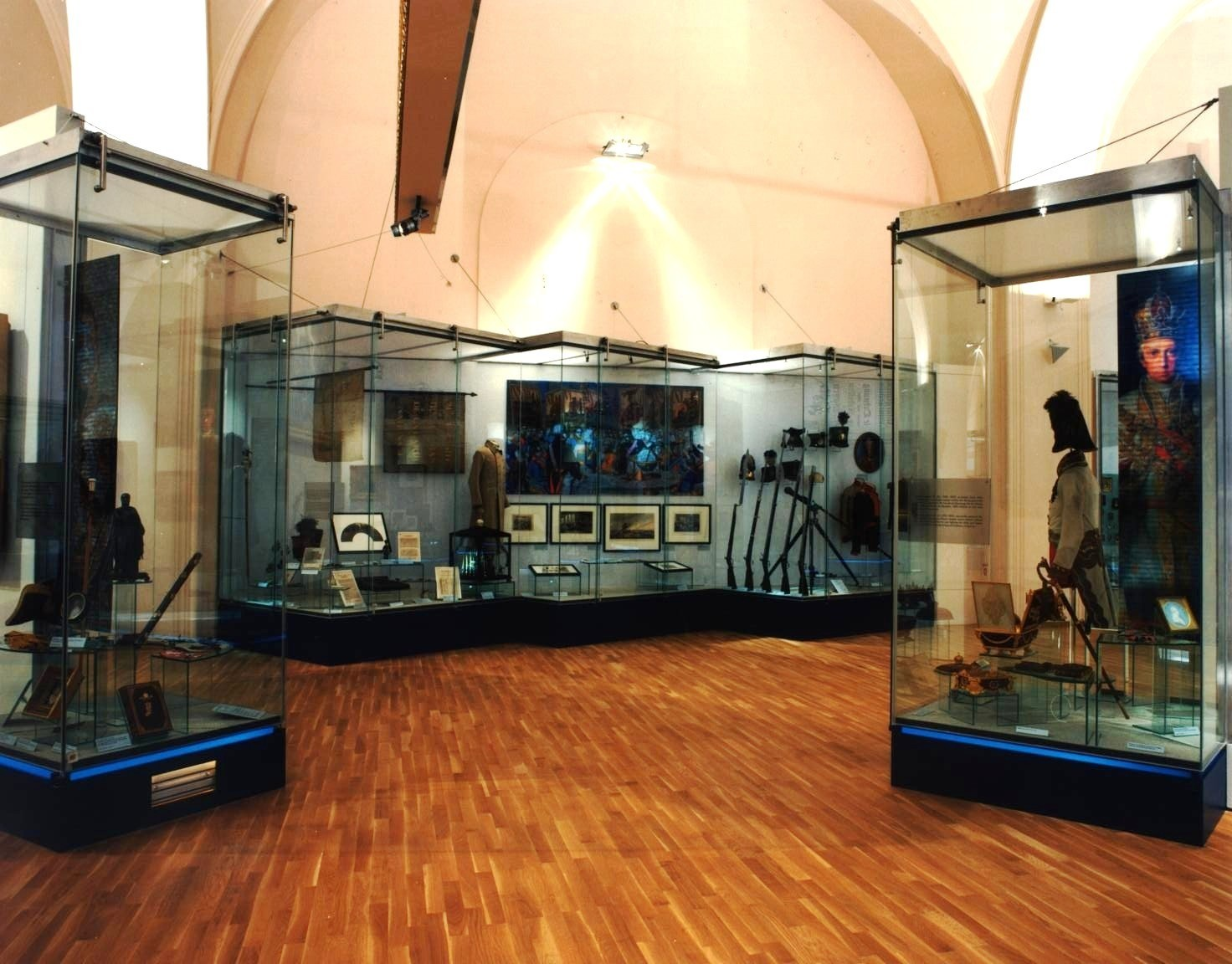
View of Hall III

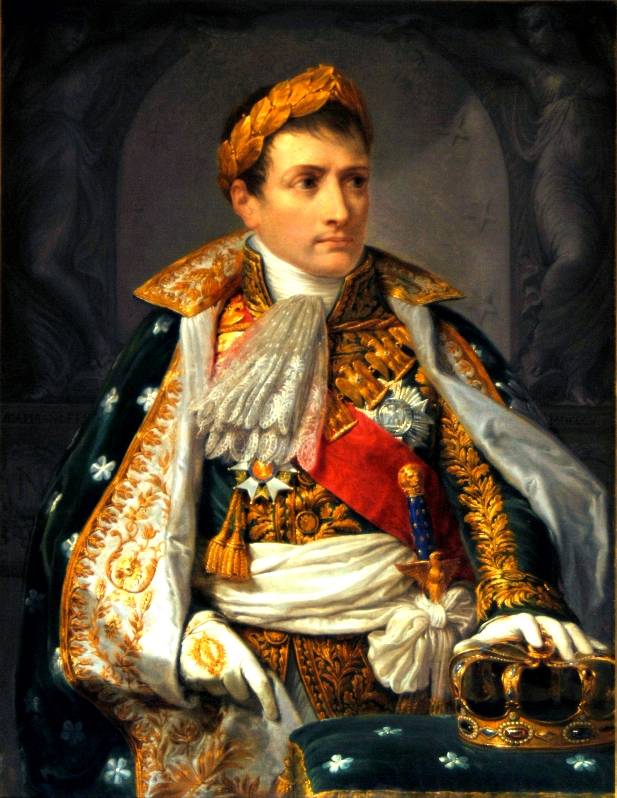
Portrait of Napoleon by Andrea Appiani

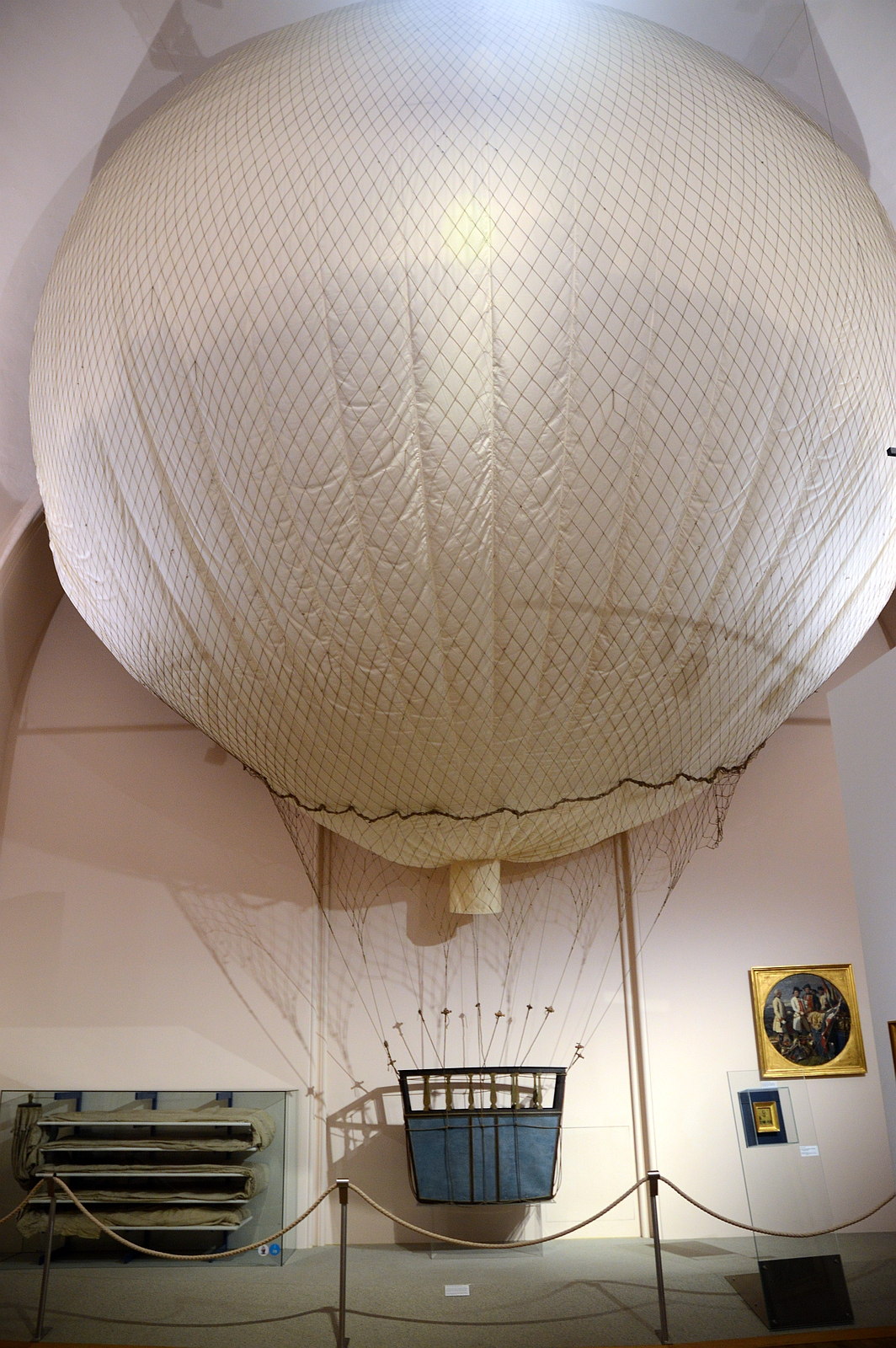
War balloon of 1796

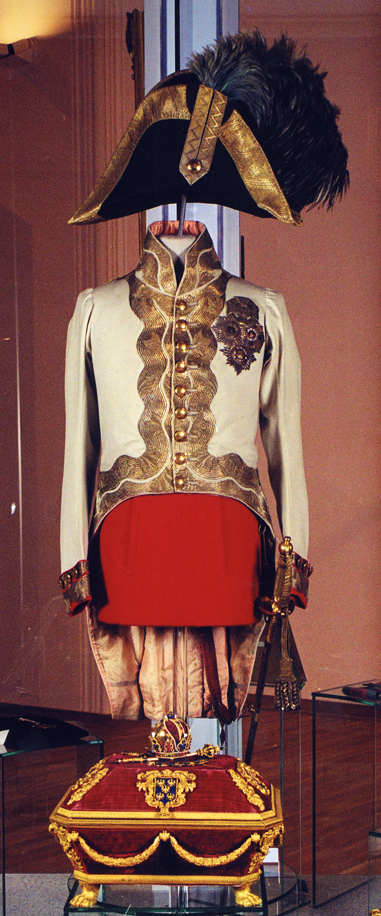
Uniform of Emperor Franz II/I

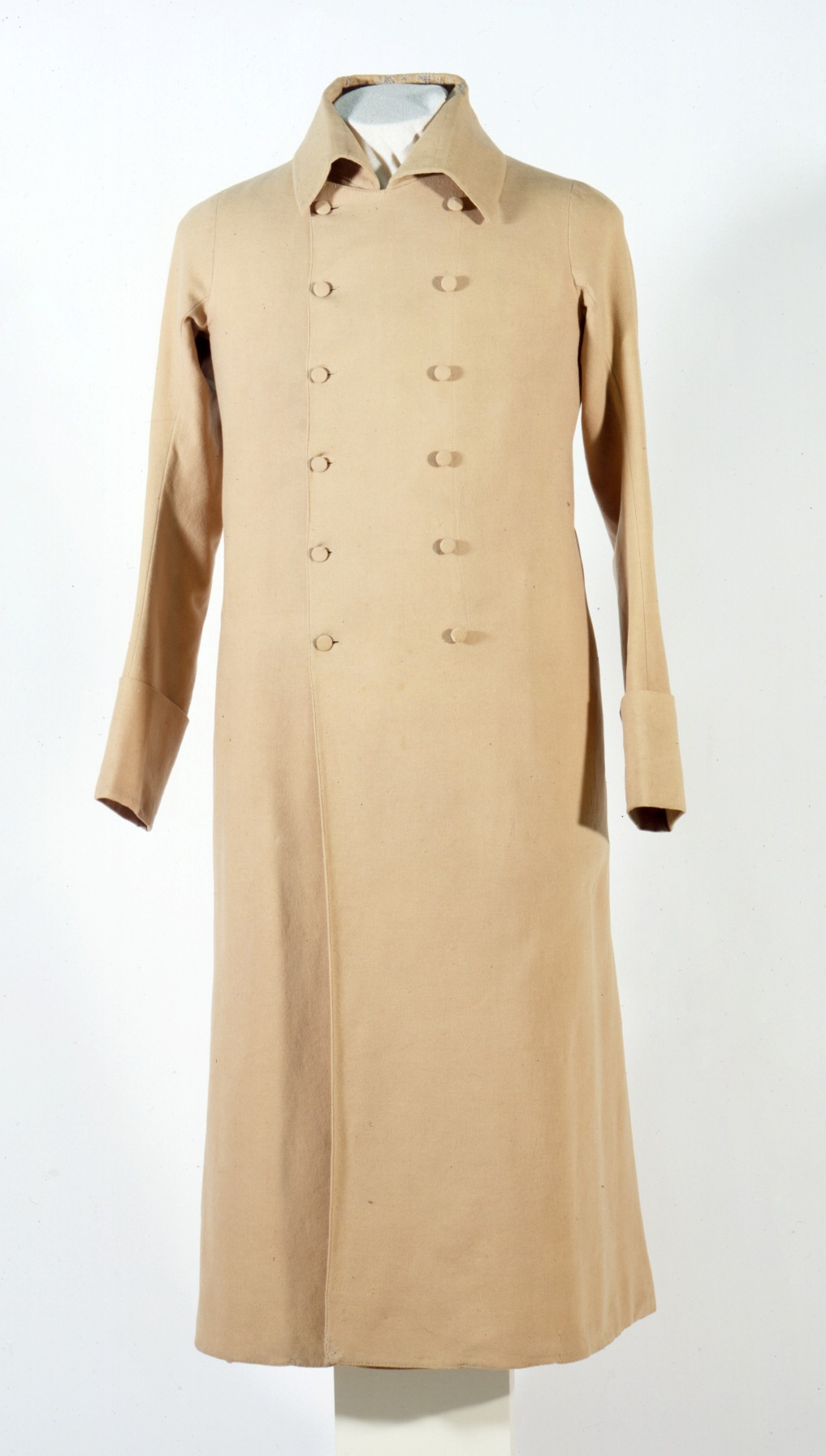
Coat of general Suvalov

A documentation of a special kind are the figurines by Helmut Krauhs (1912–1995), which illustrate the soldiers' uniforms of the Josephinist and Napoleonic eras with meticulous precision and authenticity. Uniforms, medals, and weapons, and also special individual items add to the overall picture, such as the coat of the Russian general Pavel Andreyevich Shuvalov, worn by Napoleon on his journey to exile on the island of Elba. The Vienna Congress and the personality of Archduke Karl are documented in detail, and the so-called Info-Points – interactive touchscreen monitors which visitors can use - provide further information on the events of this period using contemporary graphics, maps, and biographical notes. Hall III is also called the Hall of Revolutions because the exhibition it contains begins with the French Revolution and ends with the Revolution of 1848.

=== Hall IV – Field Marshal Radetzky and his era (1848–1866) ===
Hall IV is dedicated to Joseph Radetzky von Radetz and his era. He joined the Imperial Army as a cadet already in 1784 and fought in the last Ottoman War under commanders Lacy and Laudon. After an impressive 72 years of service, he was retired only after he reached the age of 90. He served under a total of five emperors and participated in no fewer than 17 campaigns, for which he was awarded 146 Austrian and foreign medals. His victories against Sardinia-Piemont at Santa Lucia, Verona, Vicenza, and Custoza in 1848 and those in Mortara and Novara in 1849 consolidated the reign of young emperor Franz Joseph, at least temporarily. Poet Franz Grillparzer even composed an ode to Radetzky: "Glück auf, mein Feldherr, führe den Streich! Nicht bloß um des Ruhmes Schimmer – In deinem Lager ist Österreich!", for which the poet was awarded an honorary cup now on display in the hall. The Radetzky hall also contains numerous paintings of contemporary artists such as Albrecht Adam and Wilhelm Richter, which make his military campaigns come alive.

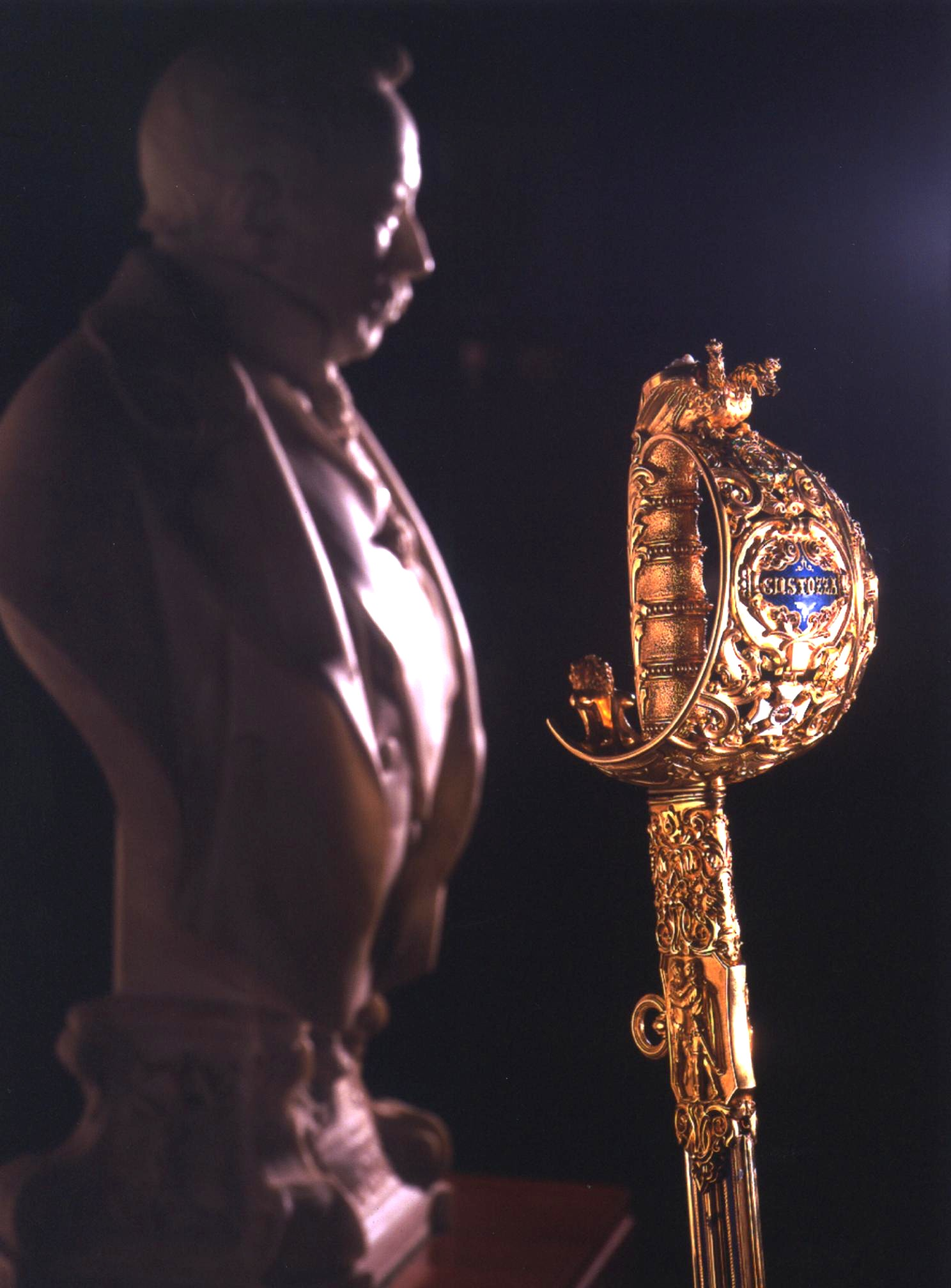
Radetzky's sword of honour

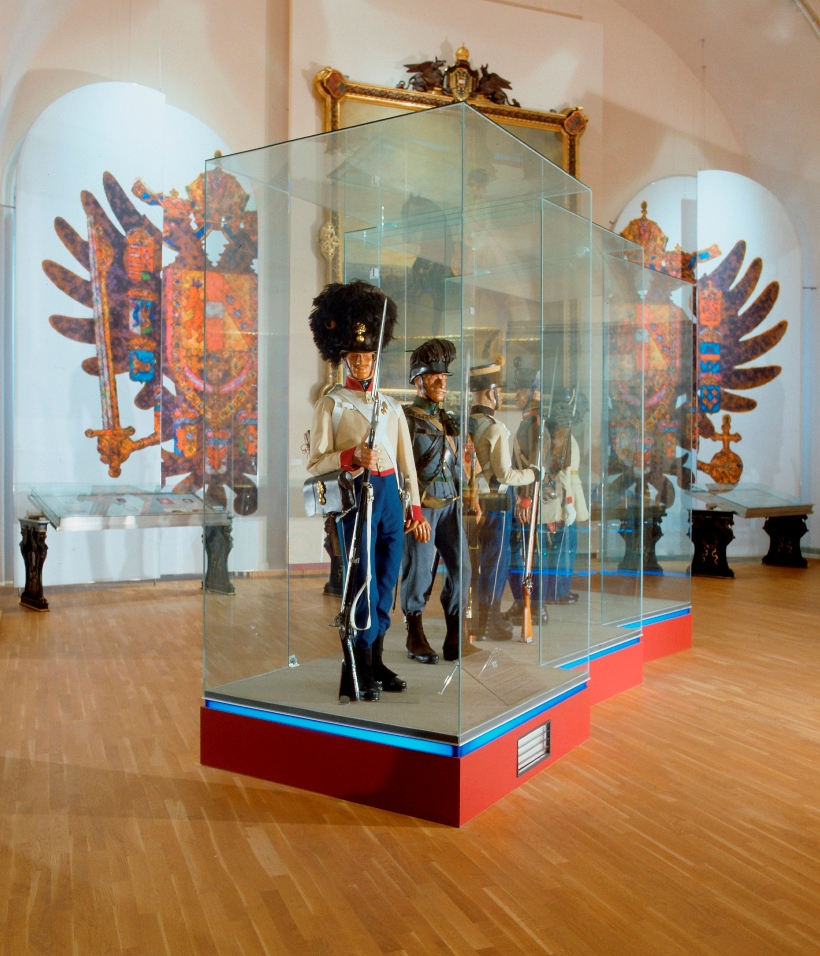
Uniforms 1848–1866

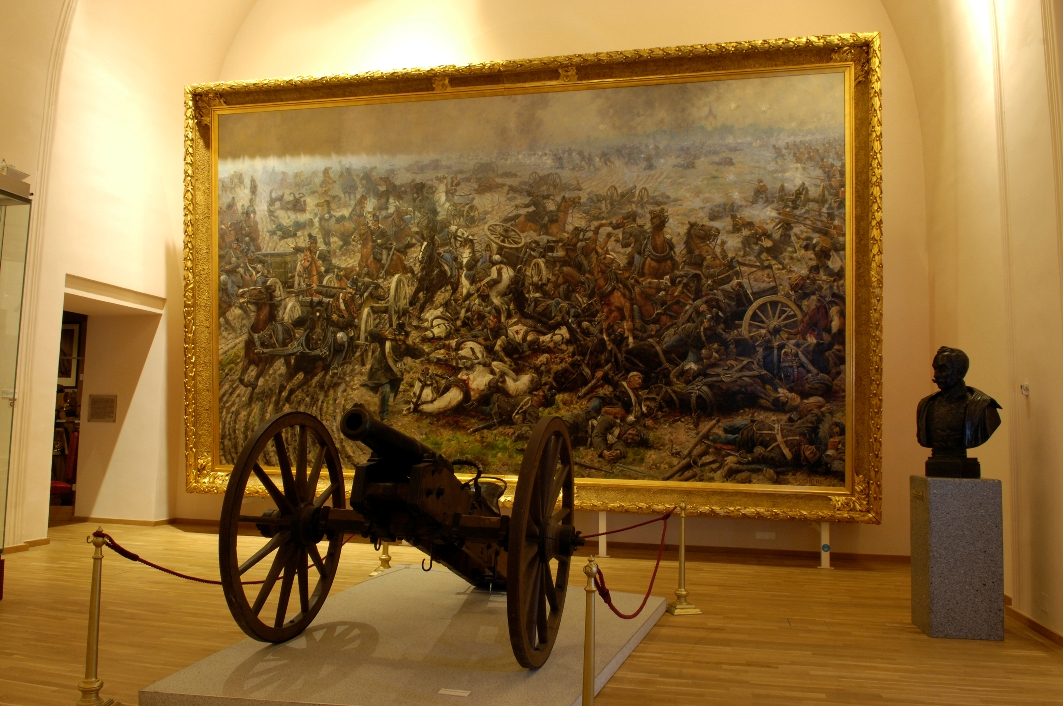
Field cannon 1863

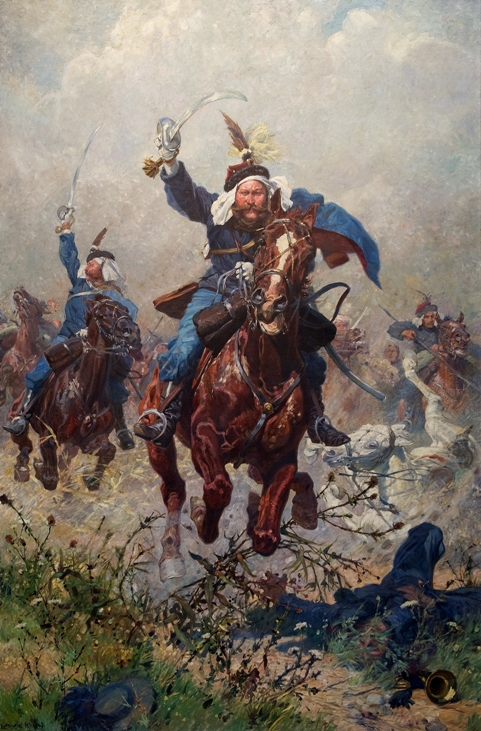
Rodakowski in the Battle of Custoza

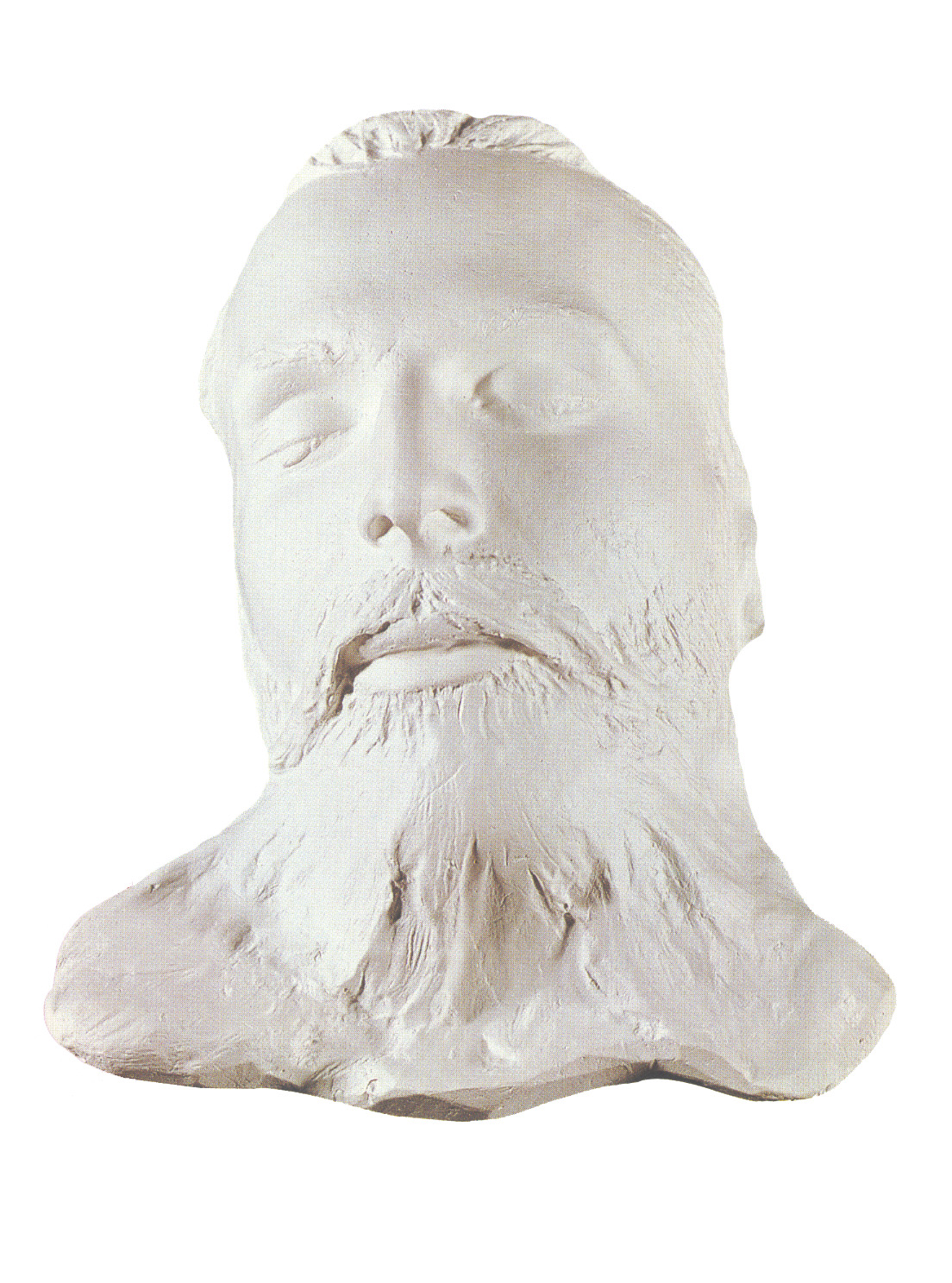
Maximilian's death mask

Following the death of Radetzky, the tables turned radically in Northern Italy for young Emperor Franz Joseph, who had only recently ascended to the throne on 2 December 1848: In the battle of Solferino in 1859, at which Franz Joseph was personally in command of the troops, Austria suffered a heavy defeat. The atrocity of the battle and the helplessness of the wounded soldiers prompted Henry Dunant to found the Red Cross, and led to the agreement of the Geneva Convention. The flow of young men to the Imperial Army, however, did not recede, because the "magic of the uniform" continued to cast its spell, illustrated by the numerous uniforms of different branches and regiments on display in the hall. As of 1864, the Austrian artillery was in possession of developments that rendered it superior to the enemy's guns, both in terms of precision and manoeuvrability. This is demonstrated by the exhibited M 1863 field gun. The situation was exactly the opposite in the case of infantry weaponry, however, exemplified by the comparison between the Austria muzzle-loader system and the Prussian breech-loading needle rifle. The defeat of the Austrian army at the battle of Königgrätz in 1866 is the subject of an impressive monumental painting by Vaclav Sochor. A separate room is dedicated to the fate of the emperor's brother Ferdinand Maximilian, who ascended to the throne of Mexico in 1864, only to be executed there at the order of Benito Juárez in 1867. The collection on display features private items which were partly obtained from Miramare Castle, and which provide evidence of his unfortunate reign in Mexico (including his death mask).

=== Hall V – Franz Joseph Hall and Sarajevo (1867–1914) ===
Apart from the uniforms and guns, when entering the Franz Joseph Hall visitors immediately notice the 34 uniform presentations of the Imperial and Royal Army painted by Oskar Brüch for the Budapest Millennium Exhibition in 1896. A section of the hall is devoted to the 1878 occupation campaign in Bosnia and Herzegovina under the command of Joseph Philippovich von Philippsberg. The central display cabinet in the hall shows the technical innovations of the army prior to 1914, such as the model of a chain-driven combat vehicle (Burstyn tank) that was never actually built, the first powerful machine-gun of the Imperial and Royal Army (Schwarzlose) and the model of a field kitchen. Also on display are examples of the beginnings of military aviation, such as models of the Etrich Taube, the Lohner Pfeilflieger, and the M 1896 k.u.k. military balloon. The highlight of the exhibition is certainly the display cabinet with the personal items of Emperor Franz Joseph. These are the only ones accessible to the public, and they include his campaign and gala surcoats, his medals, cigar holders, and pince-nez. The next items on display here are the uniforms of the Arcièren Imperial Guards, a strong contrast to the uniforms of the Imperial and Royal Army before the outbreak of World War I on the opposite side. Certainly of particular significance are the personal utensils of the Chief of General Staff of the k.u.k. Army, Franz Conrad von Hötzendorf.

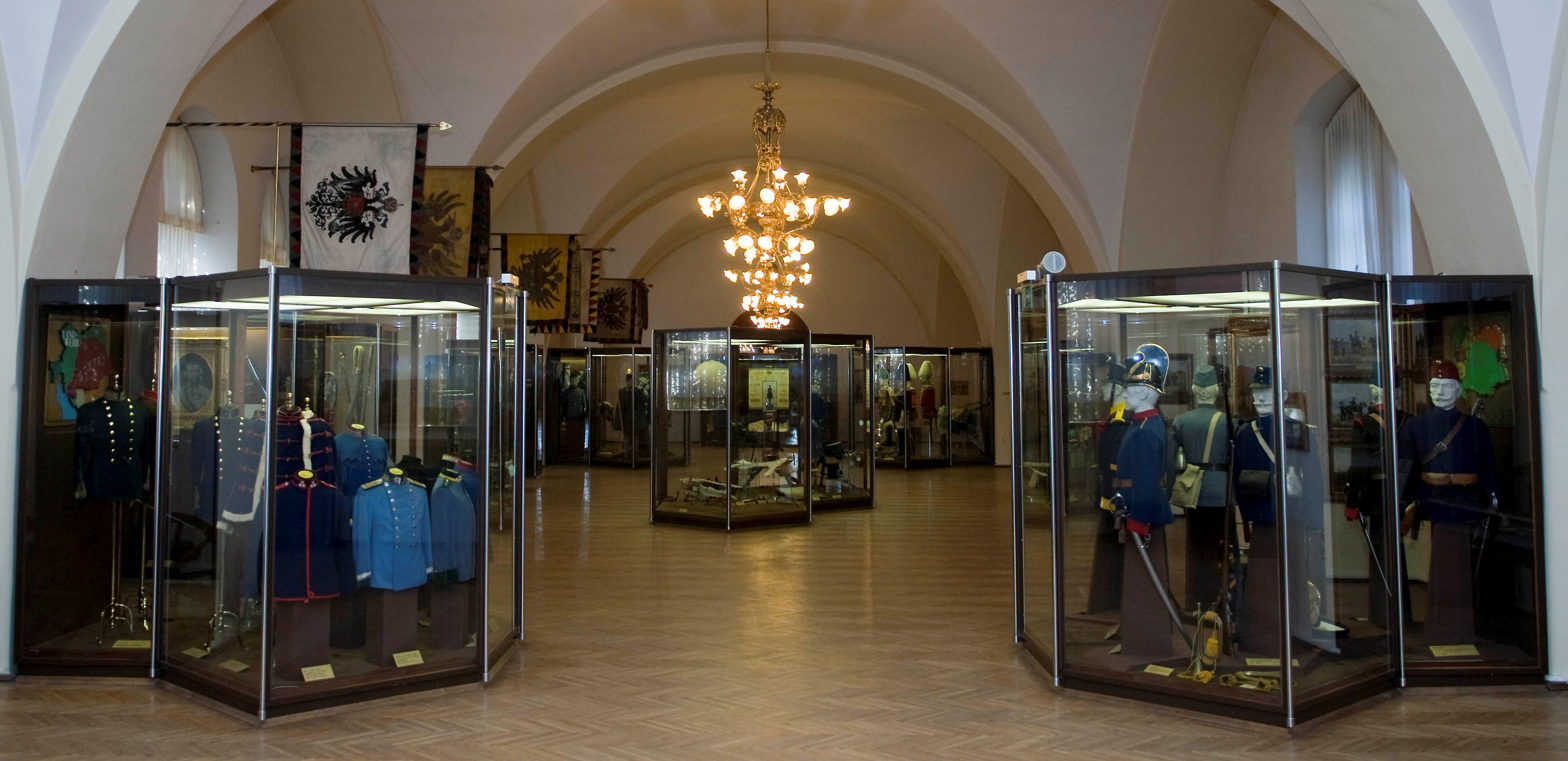
View of the hall

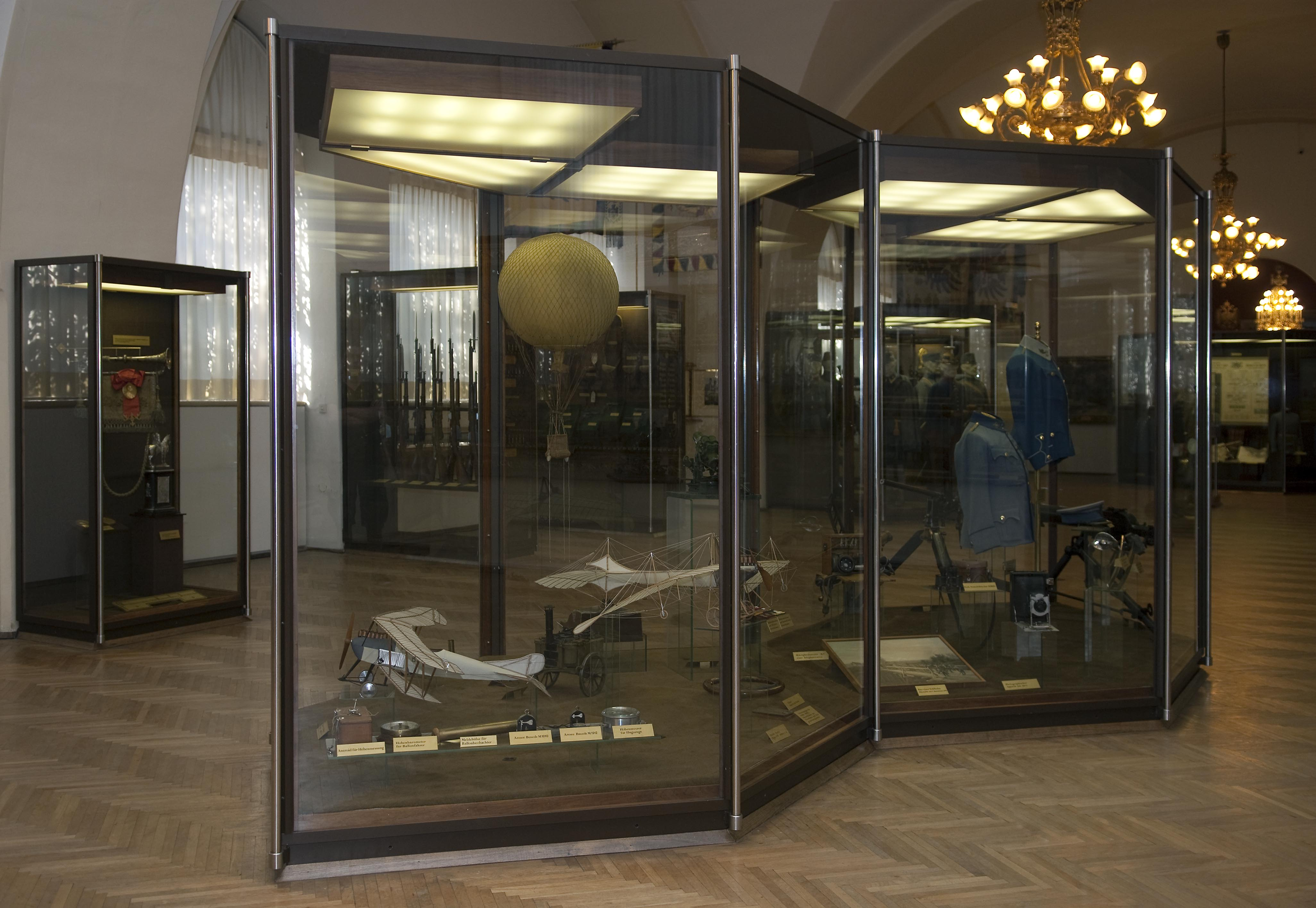
Technology before 1914

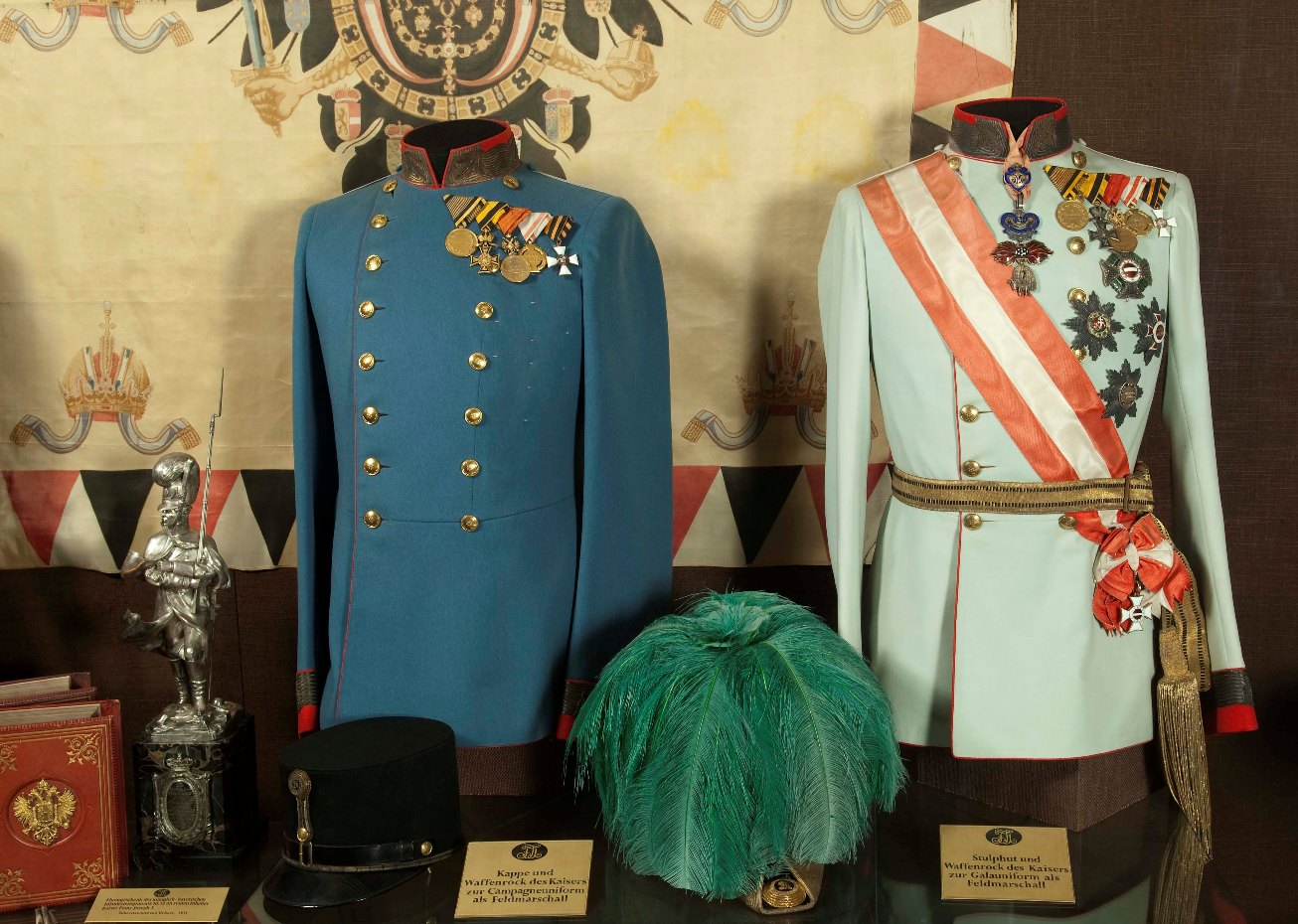
Uniforms of Franz Joseph

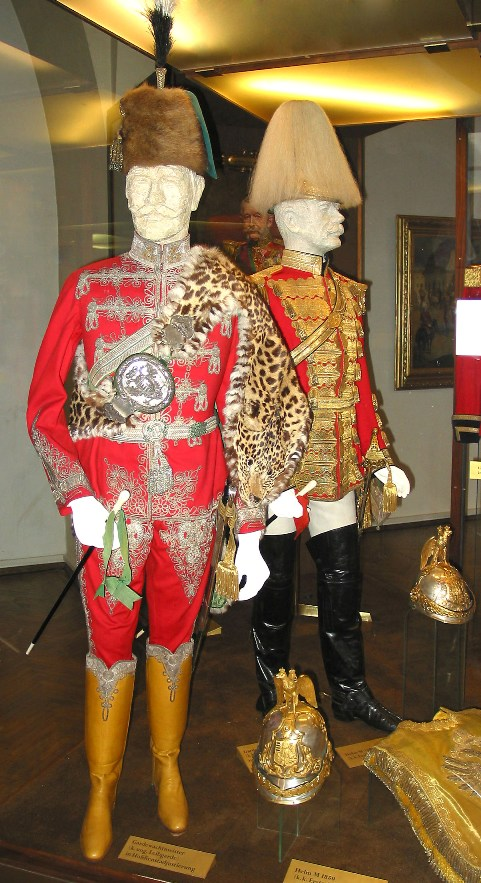
Uniforms of the Imperial Guards

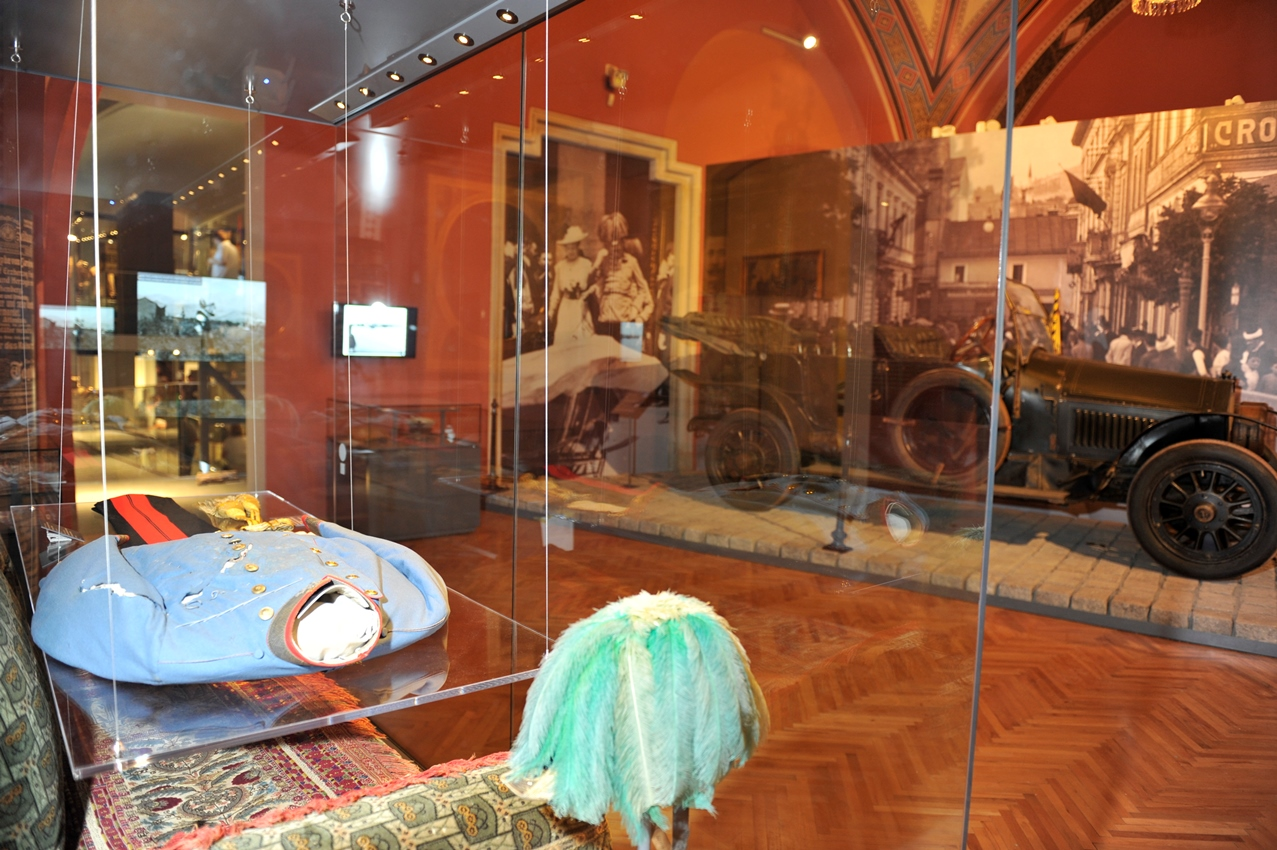
Sarajevo room

A separate bay is dedicated to the Assassination of Archduke Franz Ferdinand, which directly triggered World War I. This is where one of the highlights of the entire exhibition is on display, the Gräf & Stift automobile in which the Austrian heir to the throne, Archduke Ferdinand and his wife Sophie Chotek were murdered on 28 June 1914 in Sarajevo. The traces of both assassinations are still clearly discernible on the car. Equally visible are the traces on two other items accessible to visitors: the blood-stained uniform of the Archduke, and the chaise longue on which the heir to the throne subsequently died of his injuries. Also on display are the weapons with which the assassins waited in Sarajevo for their moment to come, including Browning M.1910/12 pistols and a Kragujevac-hand grenade. In addition to the exhibits, photographs and films of the events are also displayed on digital monitors in the Sarajevo hall.

=== Hall VI – World War I and the end of the Habsburg monarchy (1914–1918) ===
Between 2012 and 2014, the group of halls dedicated to World War I was completely converted, modernised, and redesigned. To enlarge the initial exhibition area from 1,000 to 1,400 m^{2}, the room height was reduced and an intermediate platform was introduced, so that the entire exhibition now spreads over three levels. As a result of these measures, some 2,000 items relating to World War I are now accessible to the public, about twice as many as were on display in the previous exhibition. A series of display cabinets contain the uniforms, weapons, and equipment of the warring powers. At the beginning of the exhibition, the themes focus on the mobilization of the troops in the summer of 1914, the Austrian infantry, followed by the cavalry. Next on display are uniforms and arms of the opposing parties, the Kingdom of Serbia, the Russian Empire, and the Kingdom of Italy, which declared war on Austria-Hungary in 1915. This led to the Italian Front of 1915–1918, to which a separate area is dedicated to in the exhibition. A particular exhibit is the 7-cm M 1899 mountain gun which was positioned around the Ortler summit at an altitude of 3,850 meters, making it Europe's highest gun emplacement. Apart from the weapons, uniforms, and military equipment items, the exhibition also thematizes other related material in separate areas, such as women in war, the k.u.k. military justice system, escape and displacement, deprivation and propaganda, injury and emergency medical services, religion, war captivity, disability and death. Hundreds of digital images and films are presented on flat screens.

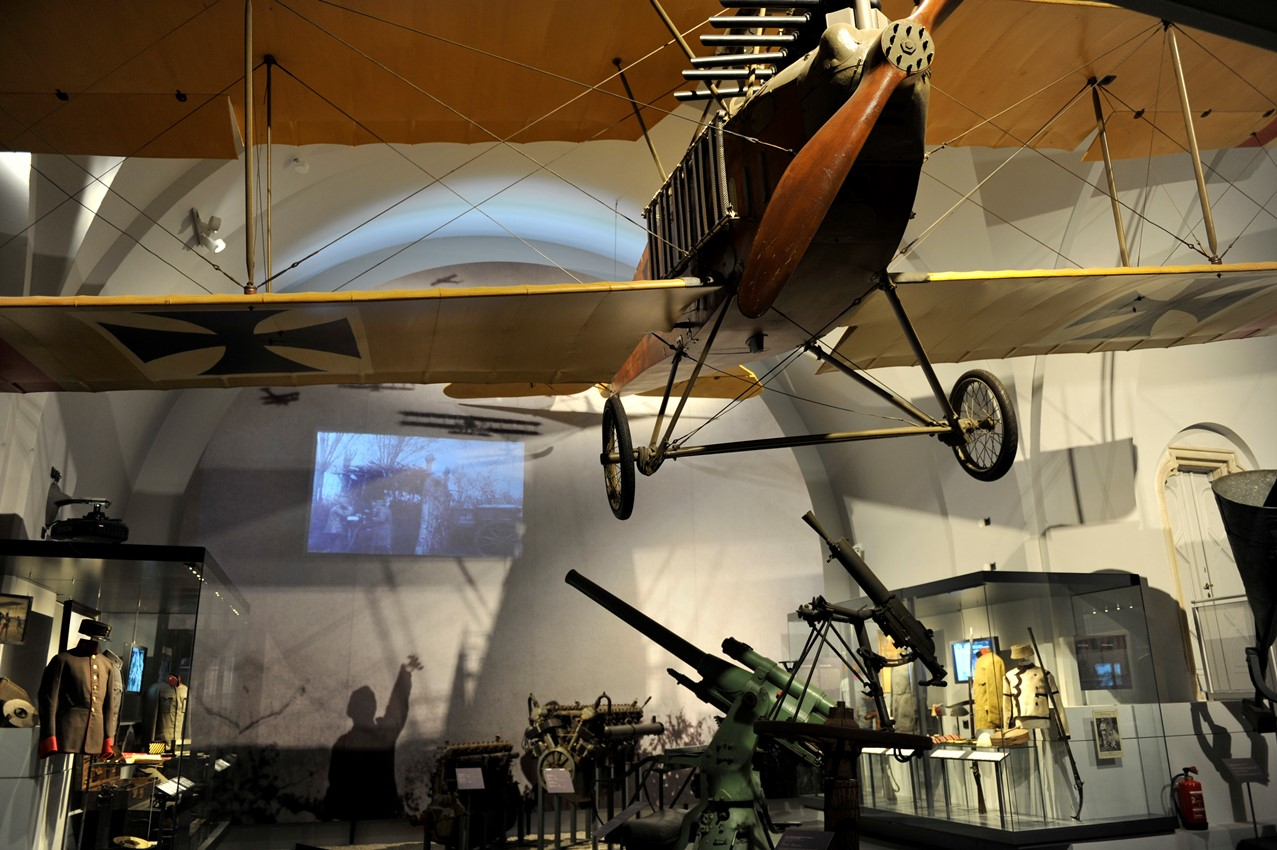
Top view of aerial warfare exhibition

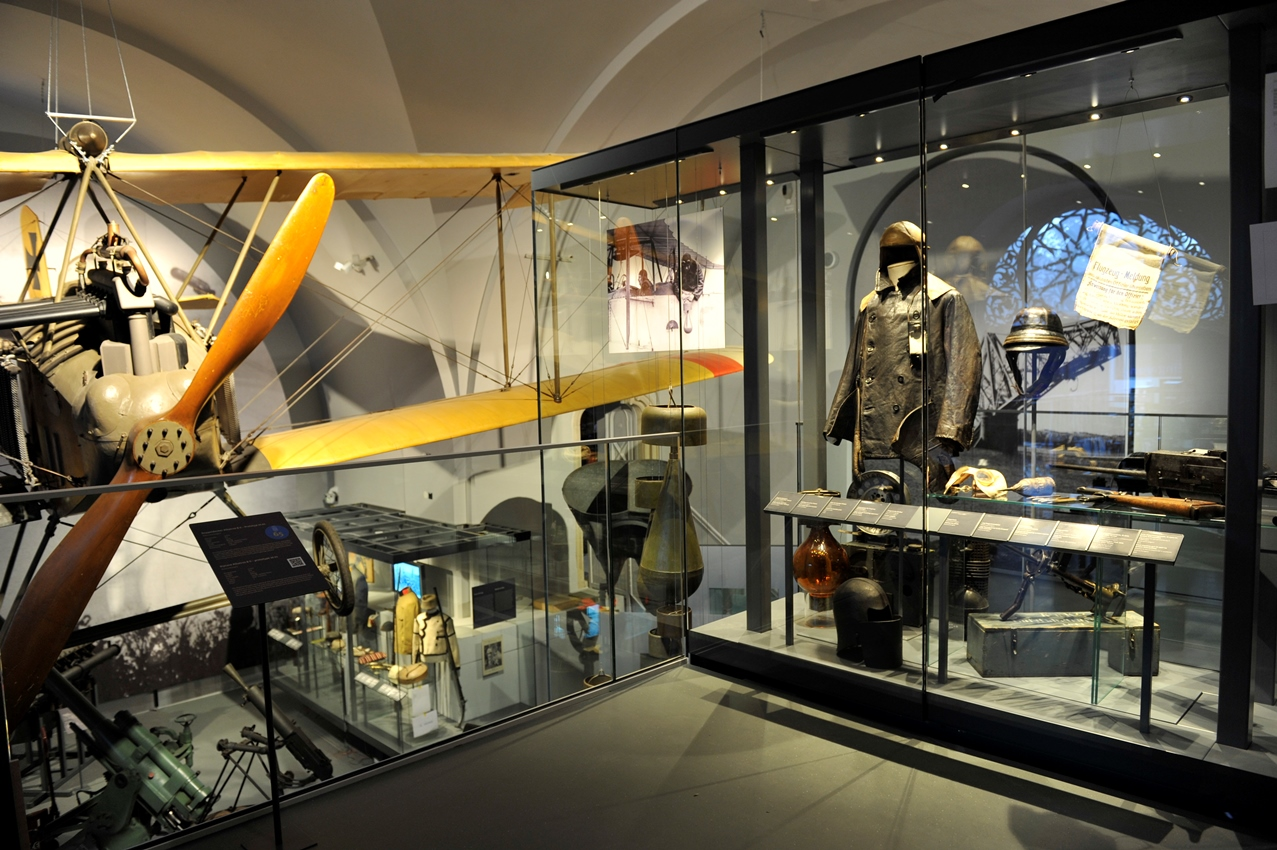
Bottom of aerial warfare exhibition

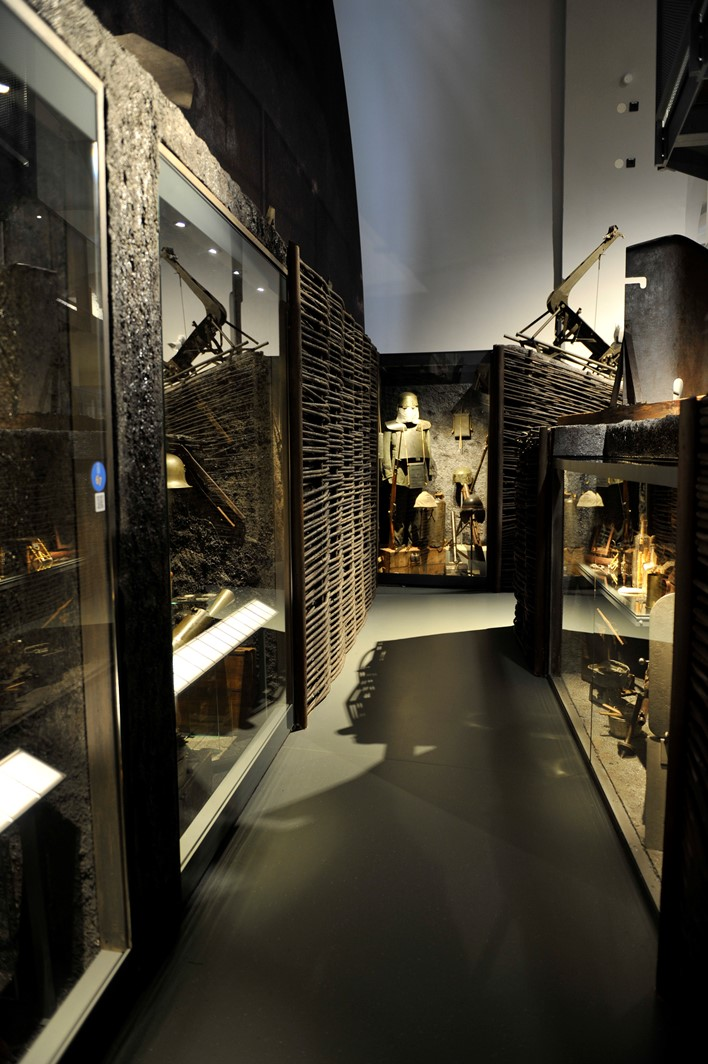
View of trench

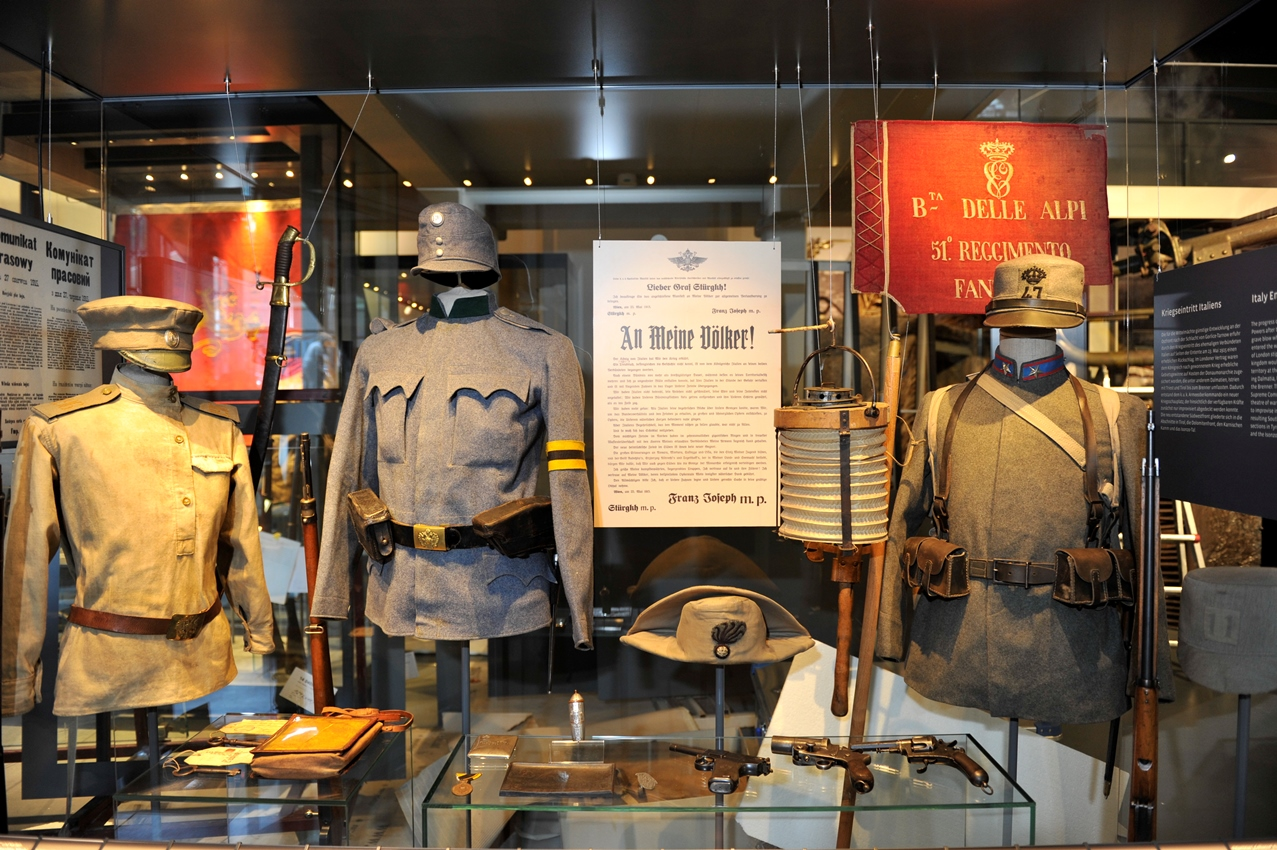
Display cabinet on Italy's entry in the war in 1915

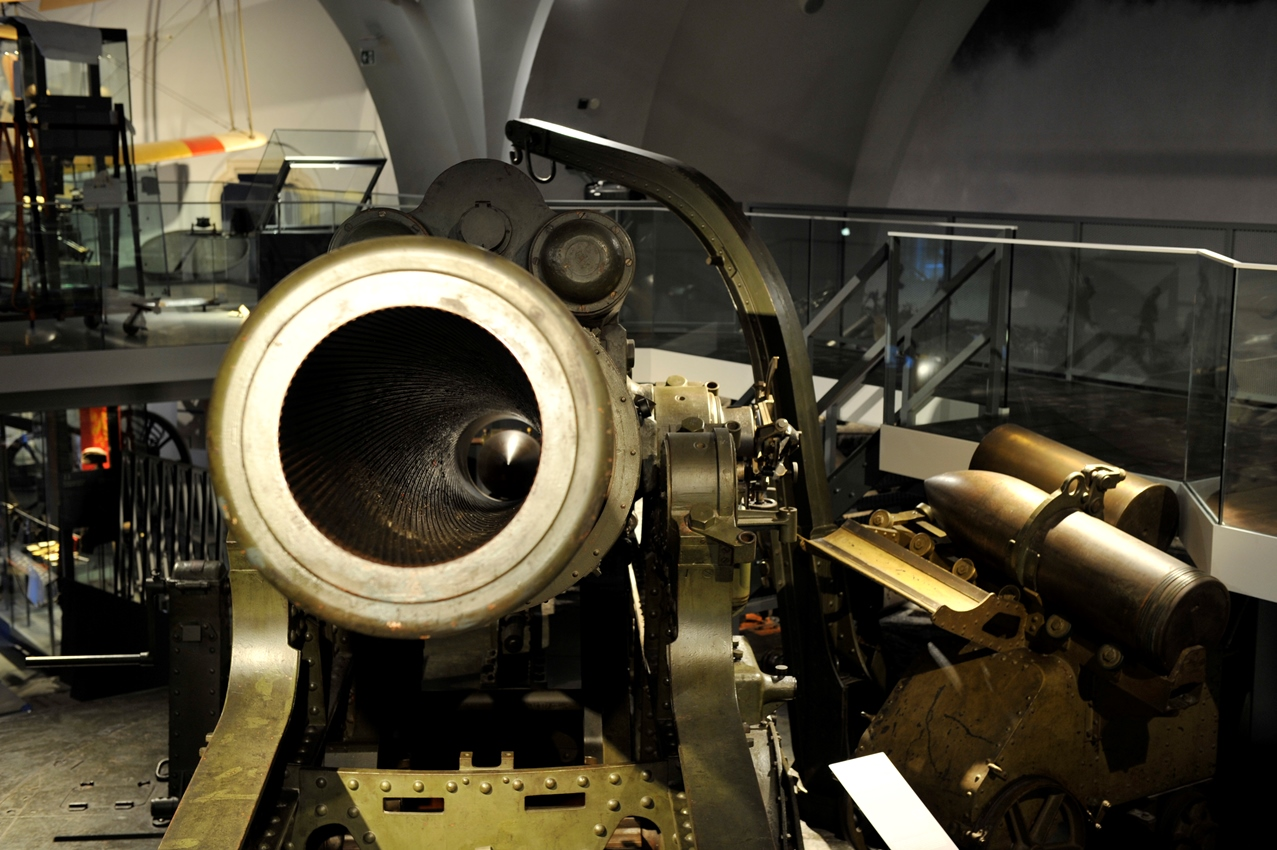
Siege howitzer M 1916

Centrepiece of the exhibition is an Austrian M 1916 38 cm siege-howitzer, which could fire shells weighing 750 kg over a distance of 15 km and shell-damaged cupolas from the Antwerp and Przemyśl Forts show the effect of bombardments by such heavy artillery. A replicated emplacement system features a series of display cabinets showing the innovations in weapons technology and equipment as of 1916, including the first Austrian steel-helmet built on the basis of the German model. Another particularly noteworthy exhibit is the Phönix 20.01 training and reconnaissance aircraft, prototype of the Austro-Hungarian produced Albatros B.I(Ph), one of 5,200 planes that the Army and the k.u.k. Navy used in World War I. Moreover, a separate area was dedicated to the k.u.k. Kriegspressequartier (k.u.k. war press bureau) and thus to the arts in war, featuring works by war painters such as Albin Egger-Lienz, Wilhelm Thöny, Oswald Roux, Fritz Schwarz-Waldegg, Stephanie Hollenstein, Anton Faistauer, Ludwig Heinrich Jungnickel, Alexander Pock, and Egon Schiele.

=== Hall VII – Republic and Dictatorship (1918–1955) ===
This Hall is dedicated to the turbulent history of the First Republic and World War II. It focuses mainly on the impact of the political events on society and the military, such as, for instance, the July Revolt of 1927 triggered by the Schattendorf judgement and the Austrian Civil War of February 1934. Exhibits include the weapon used in Schattendorf, and even an M 1918 field howitzer developed in the final stage of World War I and used against the Schutzbund in 1934. The museum only recently obtained those two writings that sculptors Wilhelm Frass and Alfons Riedel had hidden in a shell underneath the monument of the dead soldier in the crypt of Vienna's Heldenplatz. On display are copies of the two documents. Also documented is the history of the Volkswehr and the subsequent Austrian Federal Army; moreover, the assassination of Federal Chancellor Engelbert Dollfuss, Austria's annexation to the Nazi Germany and the resulting integration of the Federal Army in the Wehrmacht in 1938, and the resistance against national socialism in Austria.

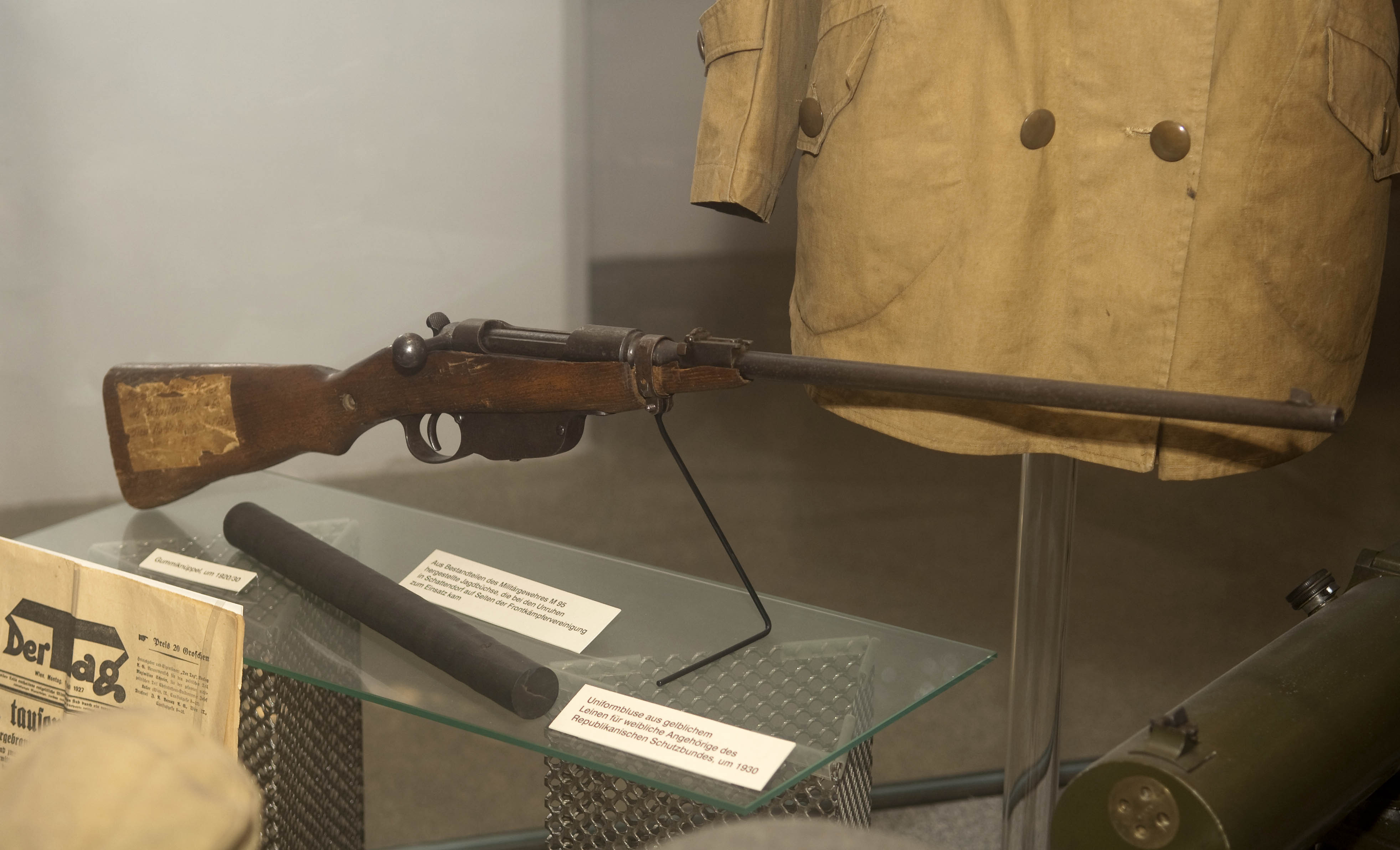
The weapon used in the crime of Schattendorf

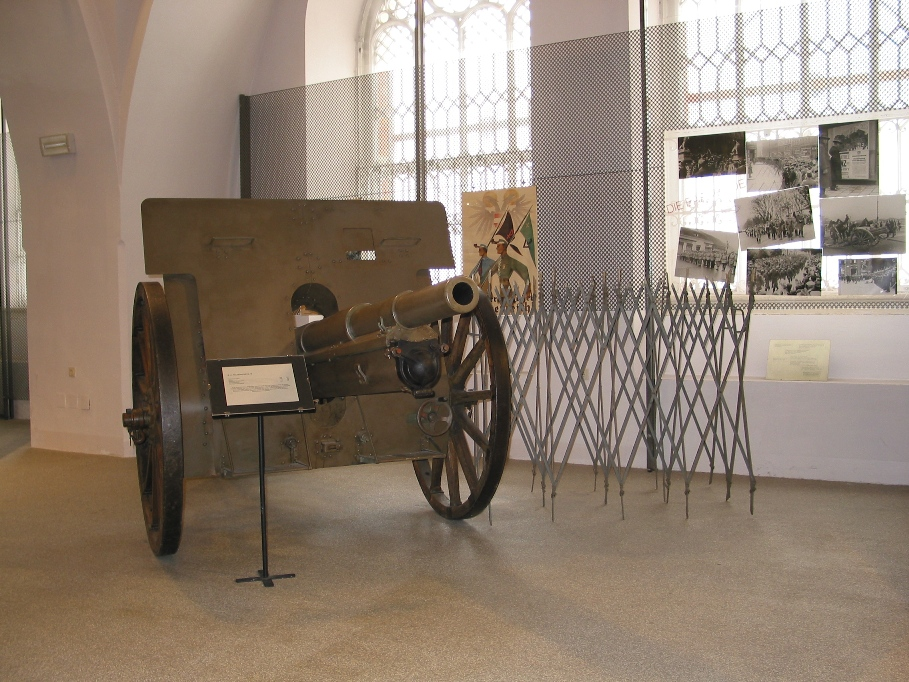
M1918 field howitzer

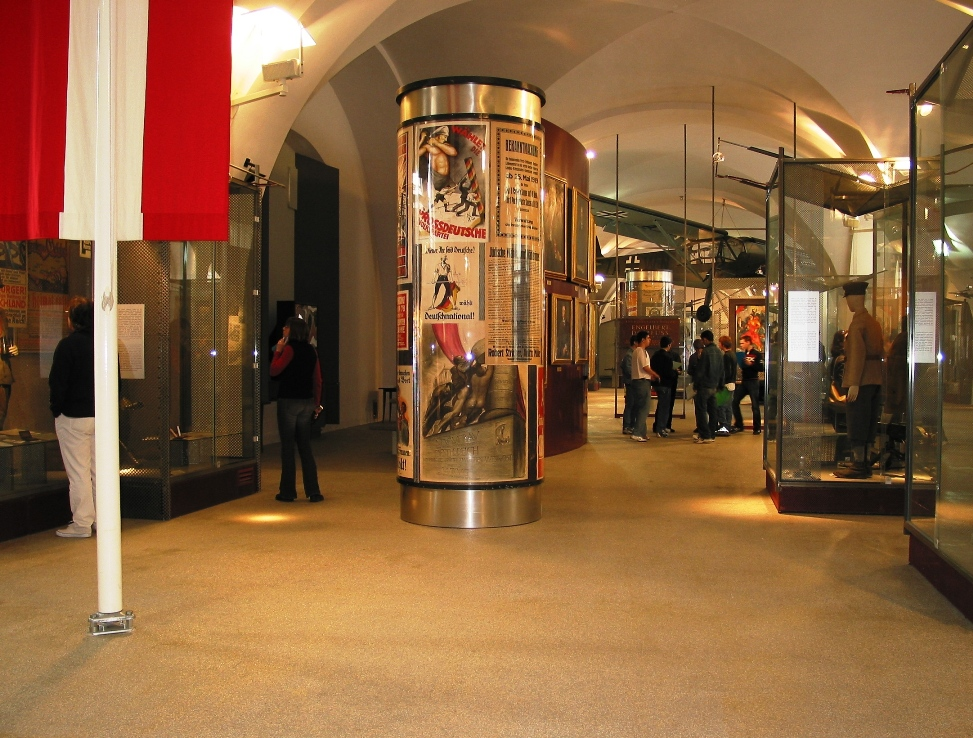
Hall VII, the Interwar years

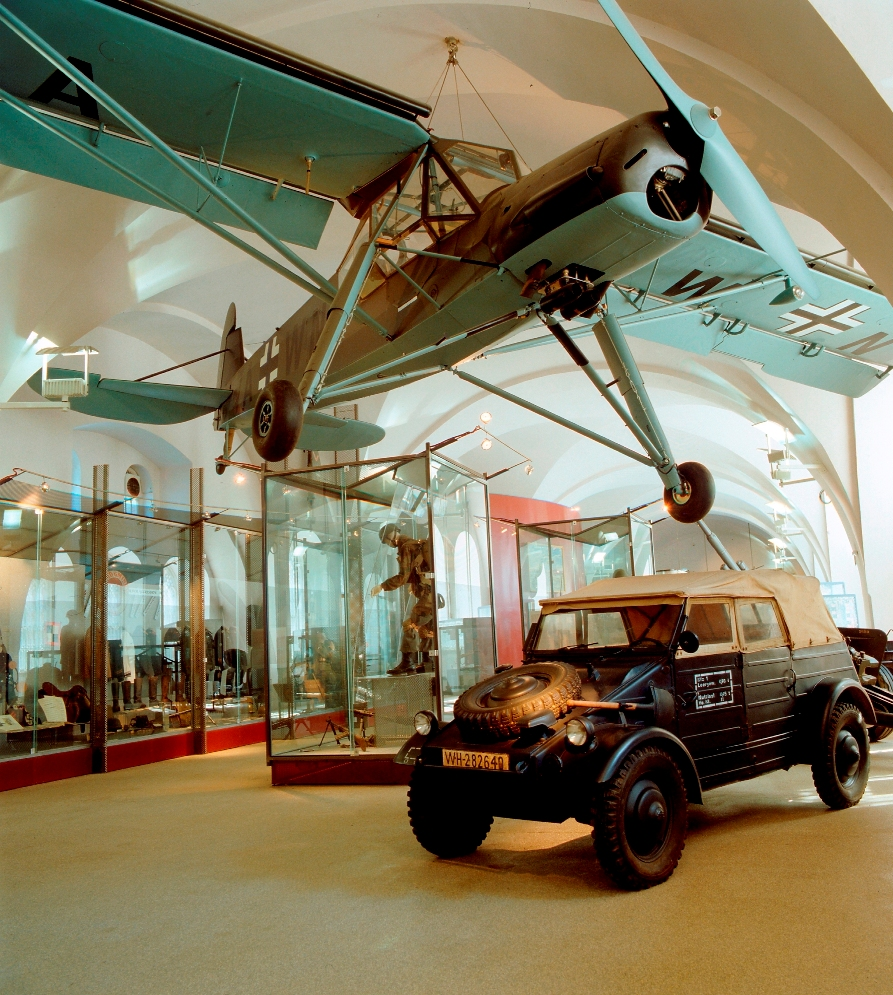
View of Hall VII Republic and Dictatorship

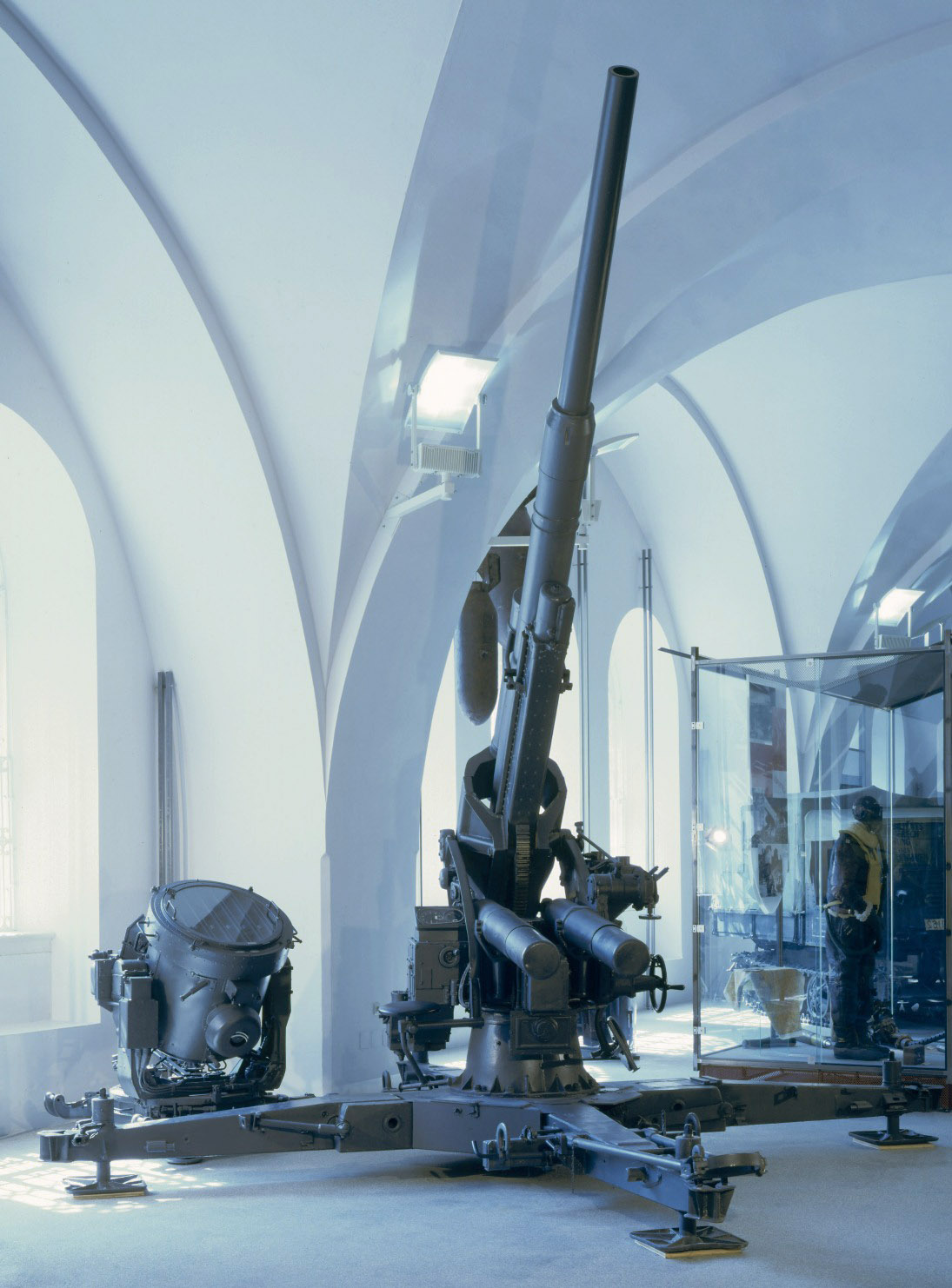
8.8 cm anti-aircraft gun

Apart from infantry/army, navy and air force uniforms of the German Wehrmacht, the exhibition also features uniforms and armour used by the opposing sides. In addition, a large variety of technical equipment is on display, including: BMW R 12 motorcycle in camouflage painting, NSU Kettenkrad (Sd.Kfz. 2), 8.8-cm anti-aircraft gun, VW type 82 VW Kübelwagen, Fieseler Fi 156 Storch aircraft, Goliath tracked mine, engine fragments of a V-2 rocket, Raupenschlepper Ost caterpillar tractor and bunker systems from the South-east wall. The exhibition also features separate theme areas such as the Battle of Stalingrad, the aerial war above Austria, and the fate of the civilian population. Moreover, it addresses the issue of resistance against the Nazi regime, the Holocaust and the consequences of total war. Another major topic is the Battle of Vienna in April 1945, featuring weapons and uniforms that were given to the troops in the final stage of the war, such as the Panzerschreck anti-tank rocket launcher and the Sturmgewehr 44 rifle. The final section of the exhibition deals with the transition to the period of Allied occupation (four in a jeep) and the postwar situation in Austria. In 2012, the permanent exhibition received an additional item, the heavy explosive carrier Borgward IV, which was discovered during demolition work on the former Vienna Südbahnhof and was transferred to the museum.

=== Hall VIII – Austria as a naval power ===
A separate hall (VIII) is dedicated to the history of the Austrian navy. The exhibition covers the entire period from the creation of the first Danube flotilla to the end of the k.u.k. war navy in 1918. What really stands out are the numerous ship models and figureheads. Various oil paintings, including some of monumental dimensions, illustrate the turbulent history of the Austrian navy, such as the one by navy painter Alexander Kircher depicting the naval battle of Lissa, an Austrian naval victory to which the exhibition devotes quite some space. Apart from some personal items of Admiral Wilhelm von Tegetthoff, exhibits also feature the model of his flagship, the SMS Erzherzog Ferdinand Max.

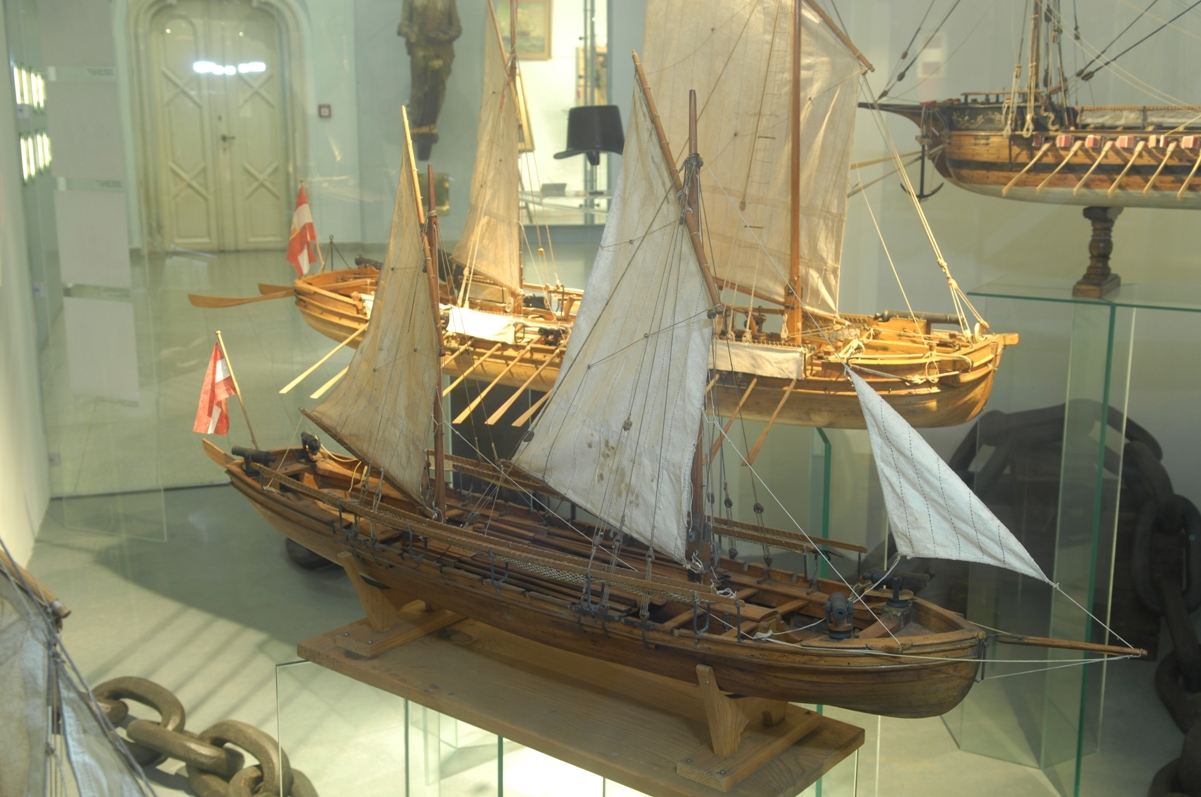
Danube galleys

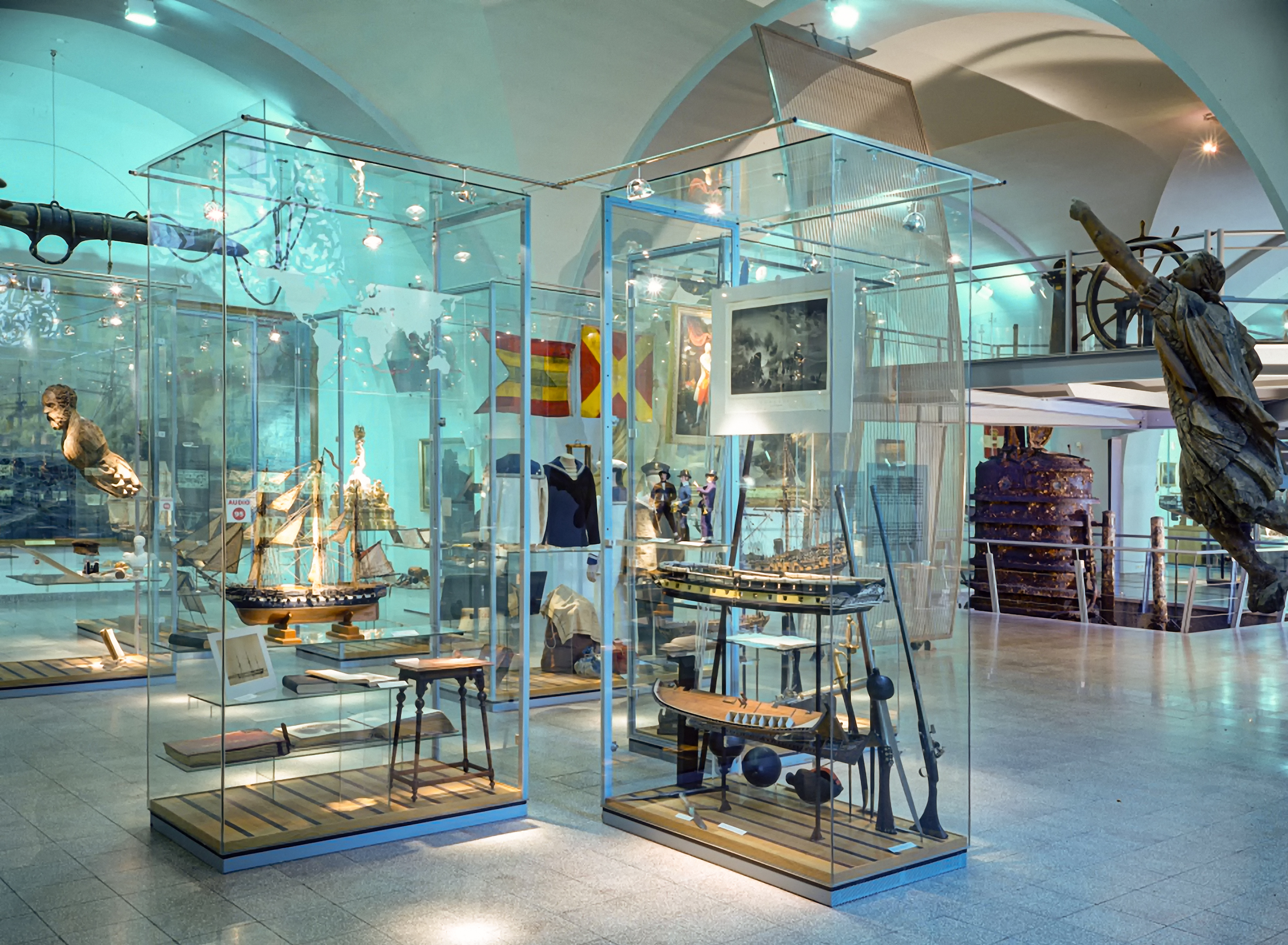
View of the navy hall

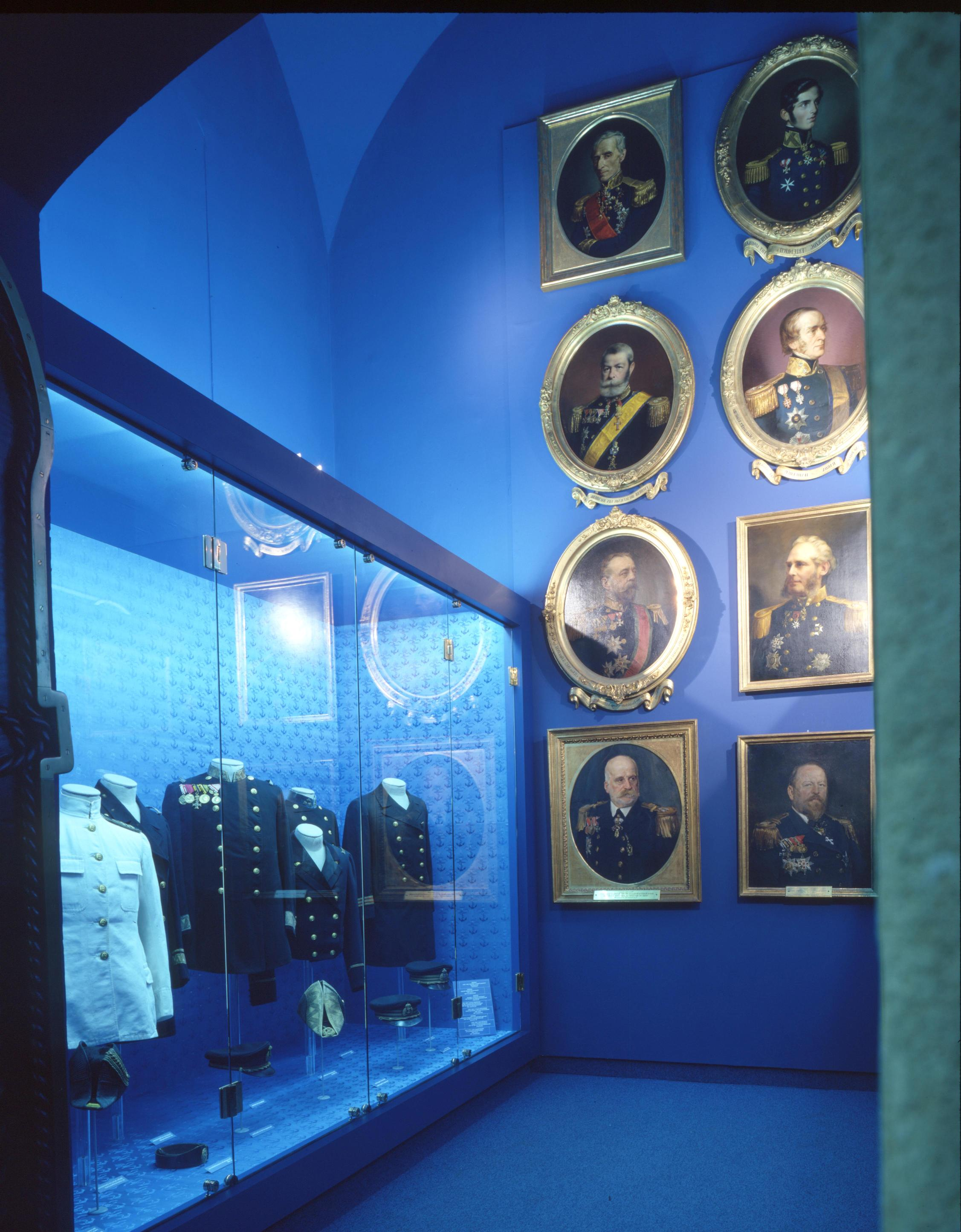
Blue chamber

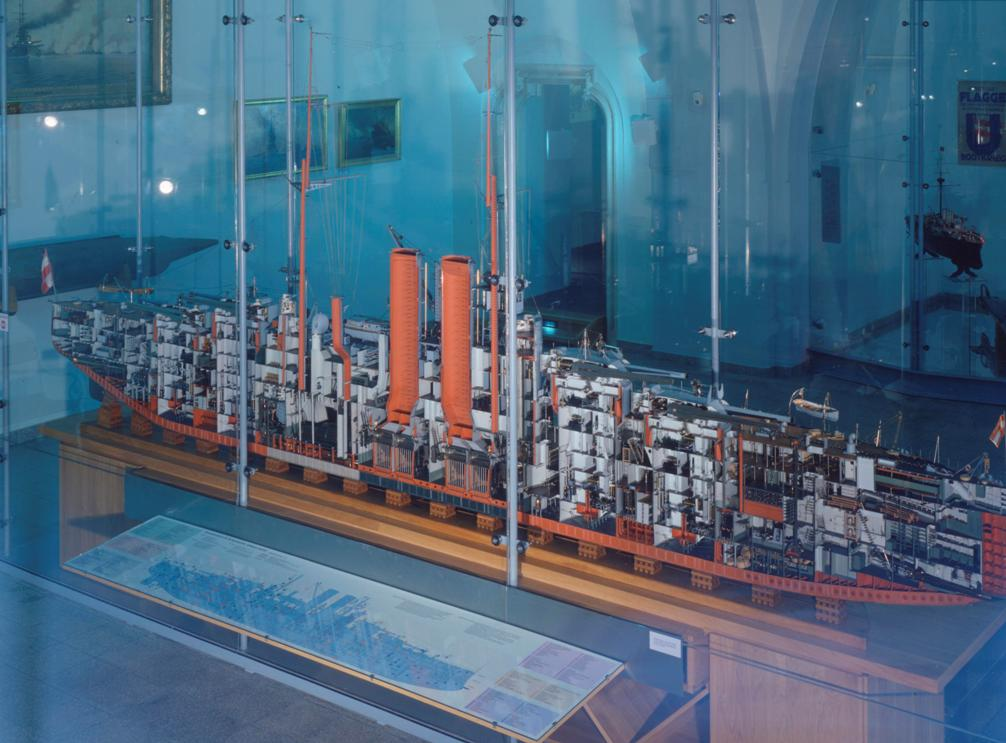
Model of the SMS Viribus Unitis

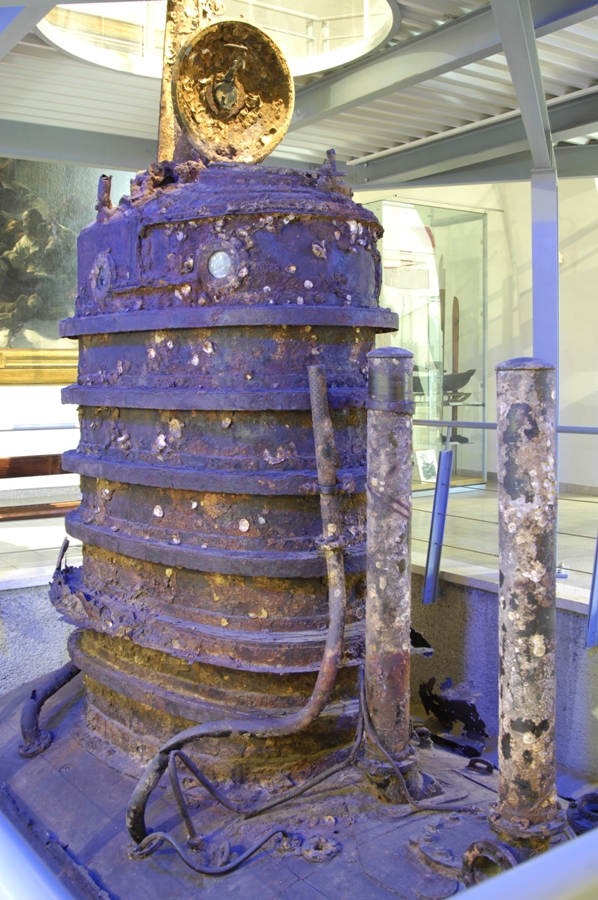
Submarine sail U-20

The particular significance of the Austrian war navy from the point of view of scientific research is illustrated by those areas dedicated to expeditions (including the circumnavigation of the globe by the SMS Novara (1857–1859) and the Austro-Hungarian North Pole Expedition (1872–1874) led by Julius von Payer and Karl Weyprecht). Spoils of war and photographs of the mission in the International Squadron off Crete in 1897-1898 and of the suppression of the Boxer Rebellion in China in 1900 illustrate the military aspects in the run-up to World War I. One particular item is the cutaway model of the flagship of the k.u.k. war navy, SMS Viribus Unitis on a scale of 1:25 and a total length of 6 metres, built between 1913 and 1917 by eight craftsmen of the shipyard Stabilimento Tecnico Triestino. The model is true to the original in structure, layout, and engine system. It is accurate to the point that, for instance, the painting in the wardroom of the model exactly replicates the original not only in subject but also in the painting technique (oil on canvas). The collection documents the first k.u.k. navy pilots such as Gottfried von Banfield, and the fate of the submarine fleet in World War I. Particularly noteworthy is the only surviving fragment of a k.u.k. submarine, the sail of U-20, which was sunk in 1918 in the estuary of the Tagliamento River and salvaged in 1962. The exhibition reaches its logic conclusion with the models of the Danube fleet, the so-called Donaumonitore, which had to be surrendered to the SHS-state on 31 December 1918.

=== Tank Garden (Panzergarten) ===
The "Tank Garden" (Panzergarten), located behind the museum building and usually open to the public from March to October, accommodates the most important combat vehicles of the Austrian Armed Forces from 1955 to the present, with the different types demonstrating the continuous advancement of tank weaponry. The first Austrian tank troops were equipped entirely with vehicles of the occupation powers, such as the M24 Chaffee, the Charioteer, the Centurion and the AMX-13.

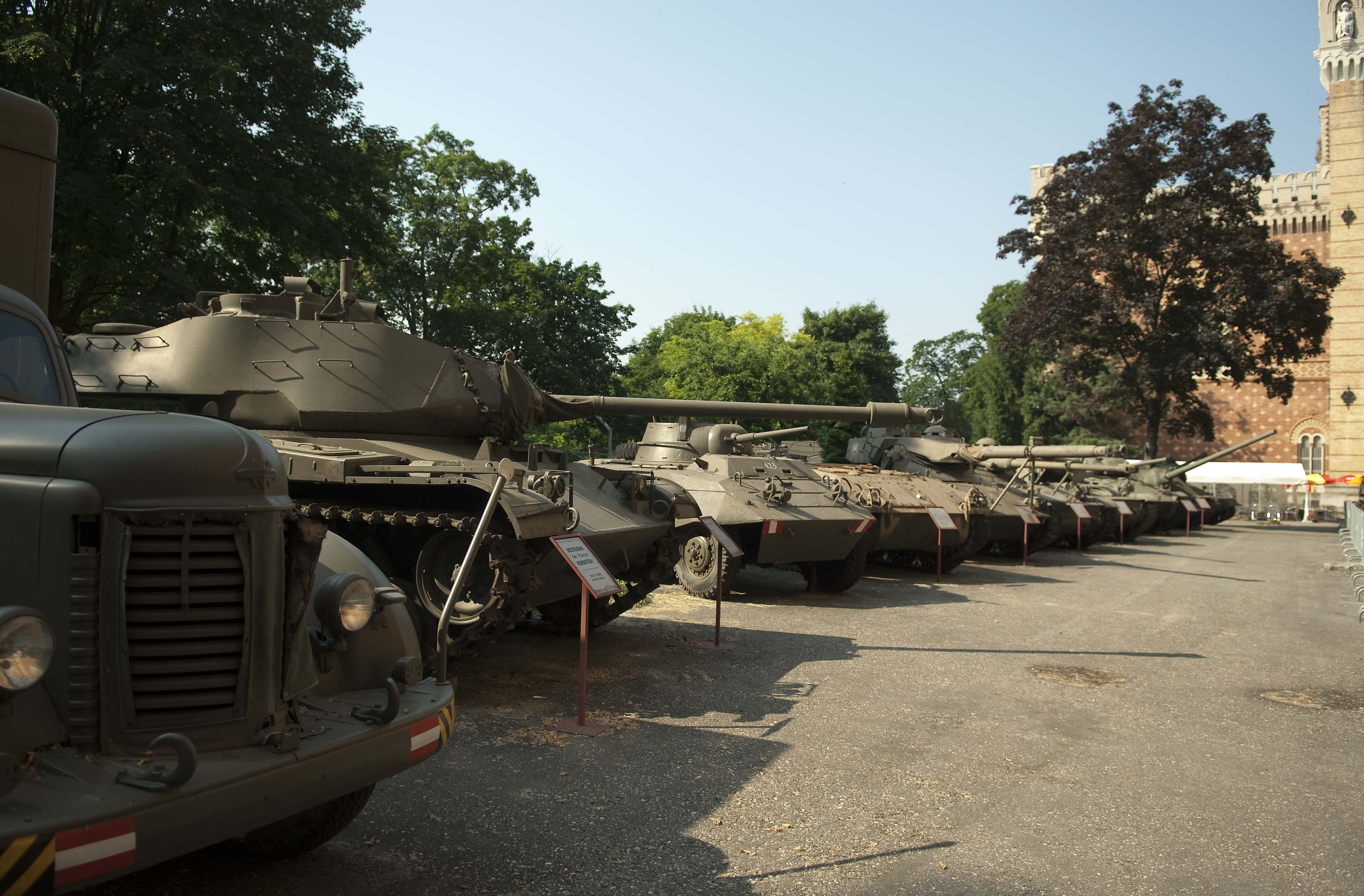
Row of tanks

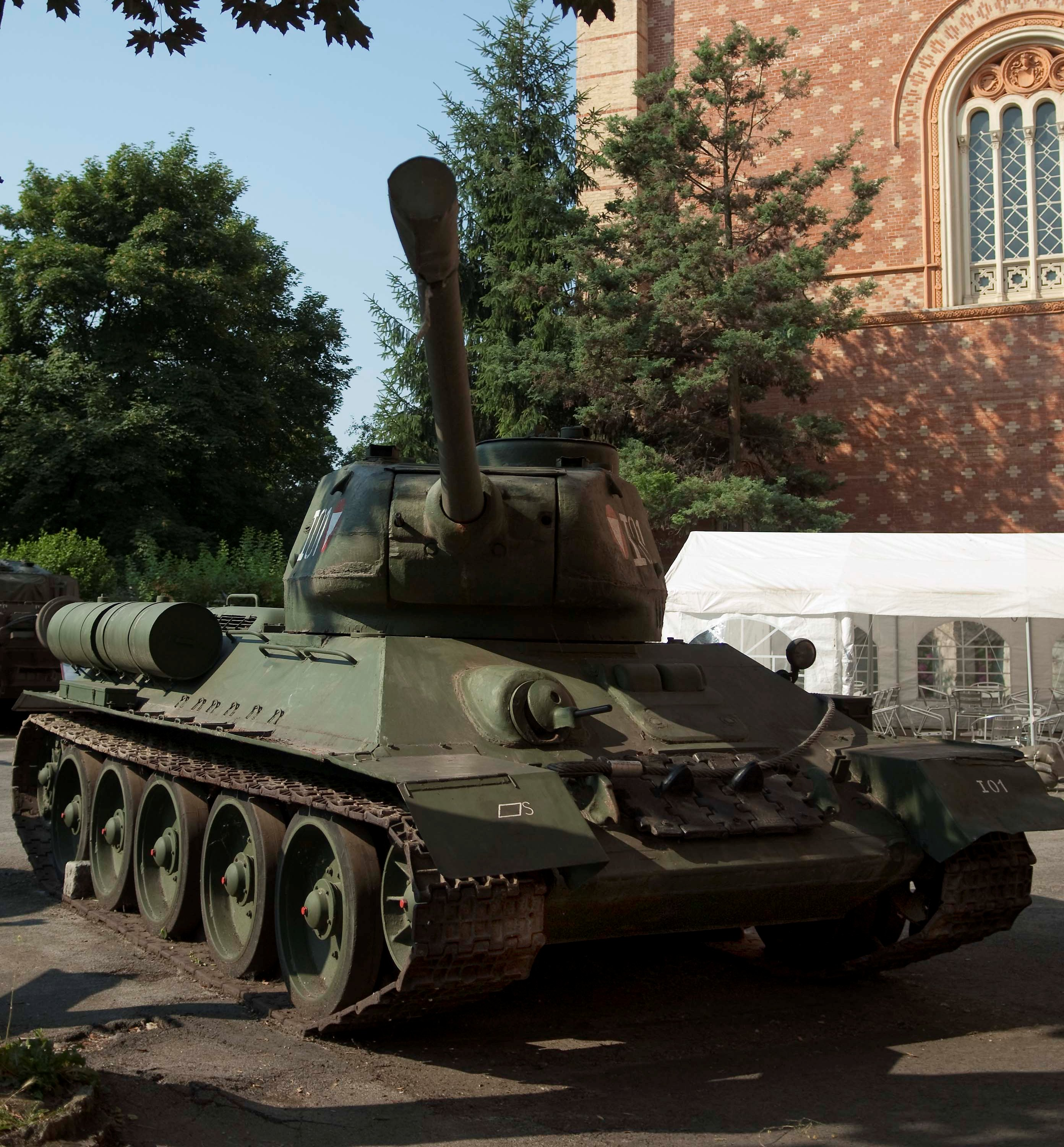
Soviet T-34 tank

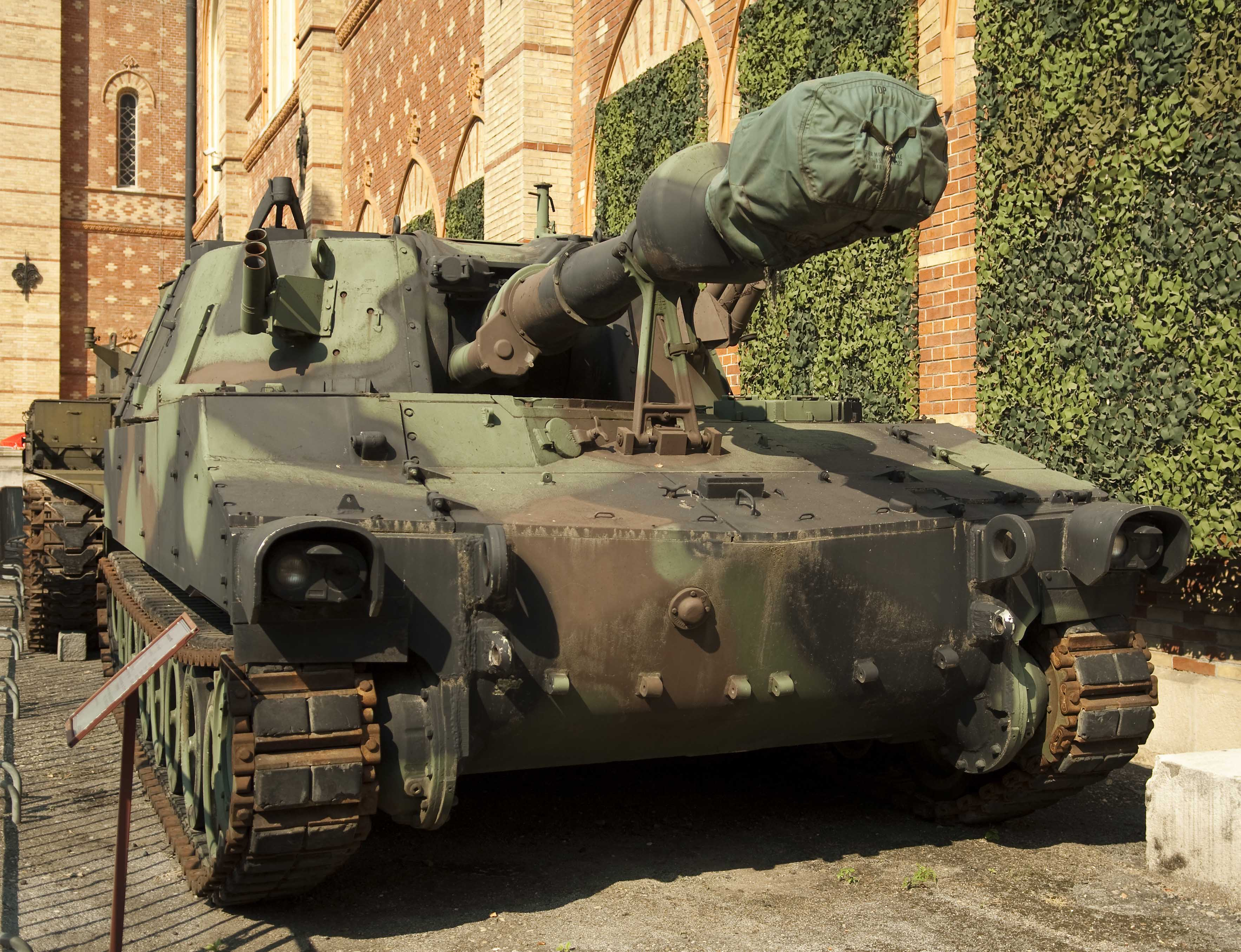
M109 armoured howitzer

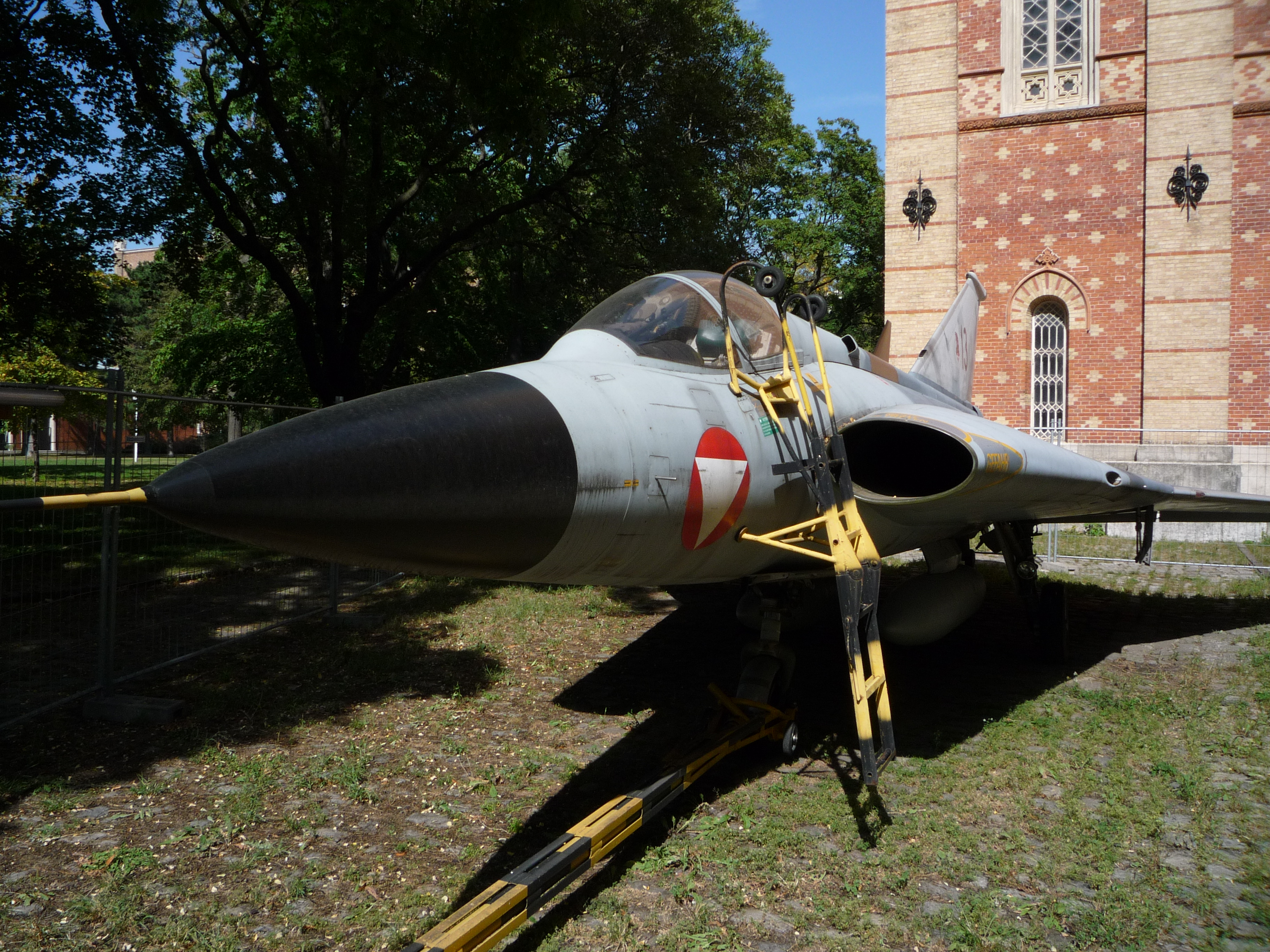
Saab Draken

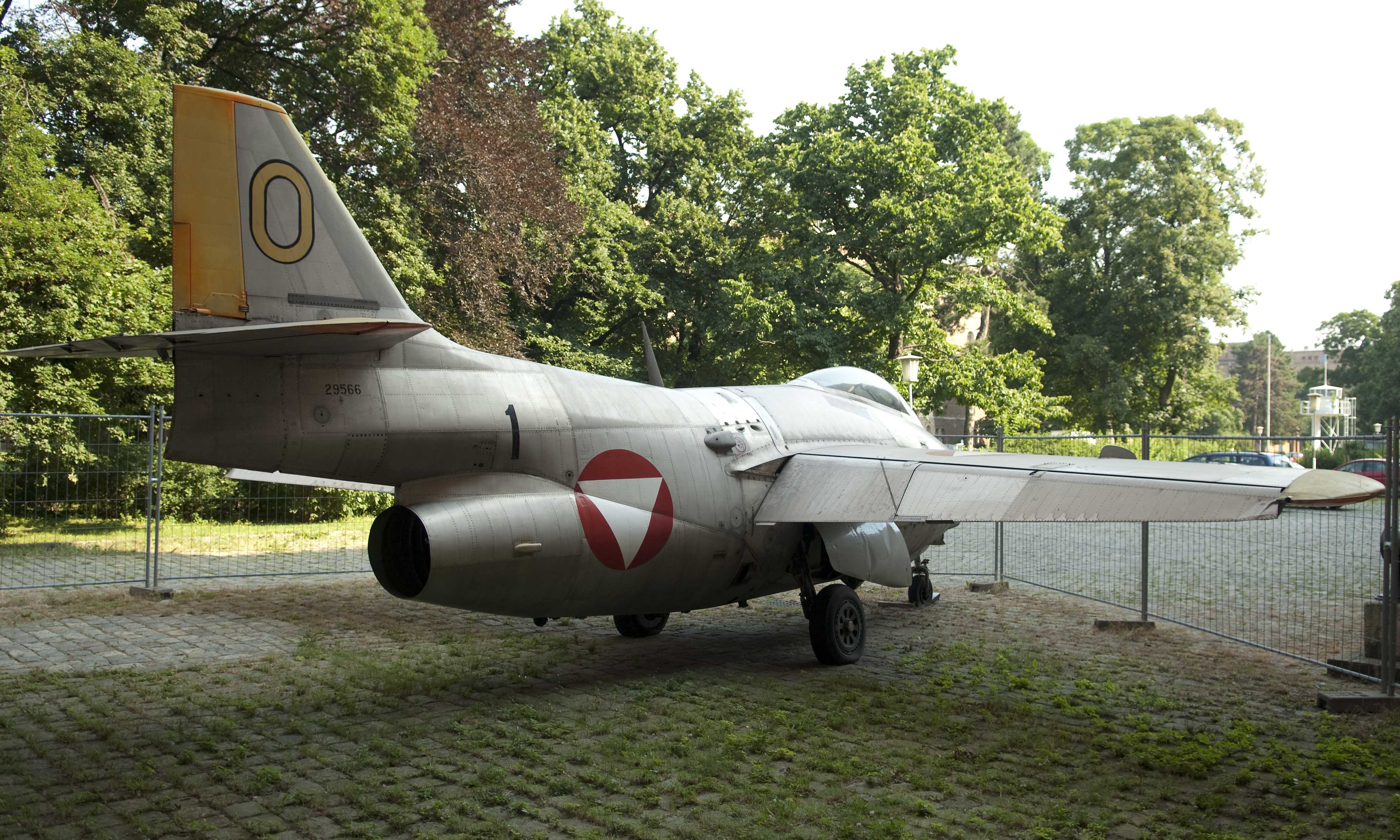
Saab 29 Tunnan

Two major Soviet World War II tank types are represented in the collection, the T-34 battle tank and the SU-100 tank destroyer, initially on display in front of the Soviet War Memorial on Vienna's Schwarzenbergplatz. Several exhibits of Austrian origin, however, are also on display here, such as the prototype of the Saurer armoured personnel carrier and the Kürassier tank destroyer, shown here in the newer A1 version. The last two armoured vehicles mentioned are still in use in the Austrian Armed Forces, just like the M109 tank howitzer, also on display in the tank garden. A Jaguar 1 tank destroyer is on display and the M60 main battle tank, in use by the Austrian Armed Forces for several years, is the largest and heaviest track vehicle of this collection. In addition, two aircraft are on display in the outdoor area in front of the museum, a Saab 29 Tunnan, also known as the "Flying barrel", and a Saab 35-OE Draken.

=== Artillery halls ===
The collection of cannons of the Heeresgeschichtliches Museum comprises a total of 550 guns and barrels, making it one of the most important collections of its kind in the world. The majority of the exhibits in the collection are still from the old Imperial armoury. Initially, the collection was more than double the size of the current one, but several historically valuable items were melted down for their metal content. Many of the gun barrels are located either inside the halls or in front of the museum building, yet the majority is on display in the two artillery halls (buildings 2 and 17) which flank building 1, the former headquarters of the Arsenal. Building 2 - the one on the left as seen from the museum - is dedicated to the development of artillery from the Middle Ages until the 18th century.

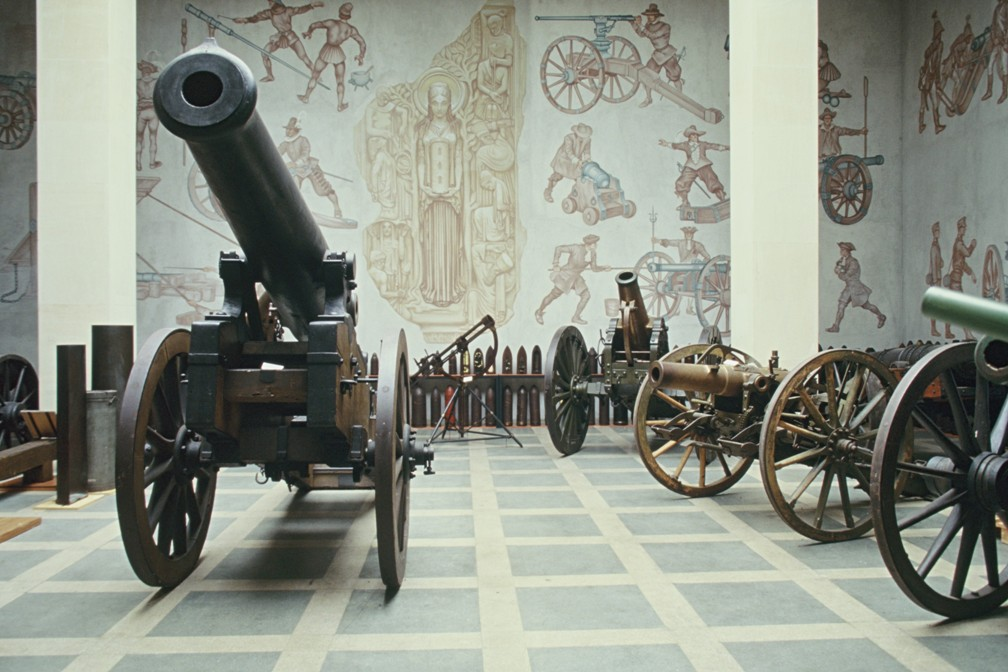
Artillery hall

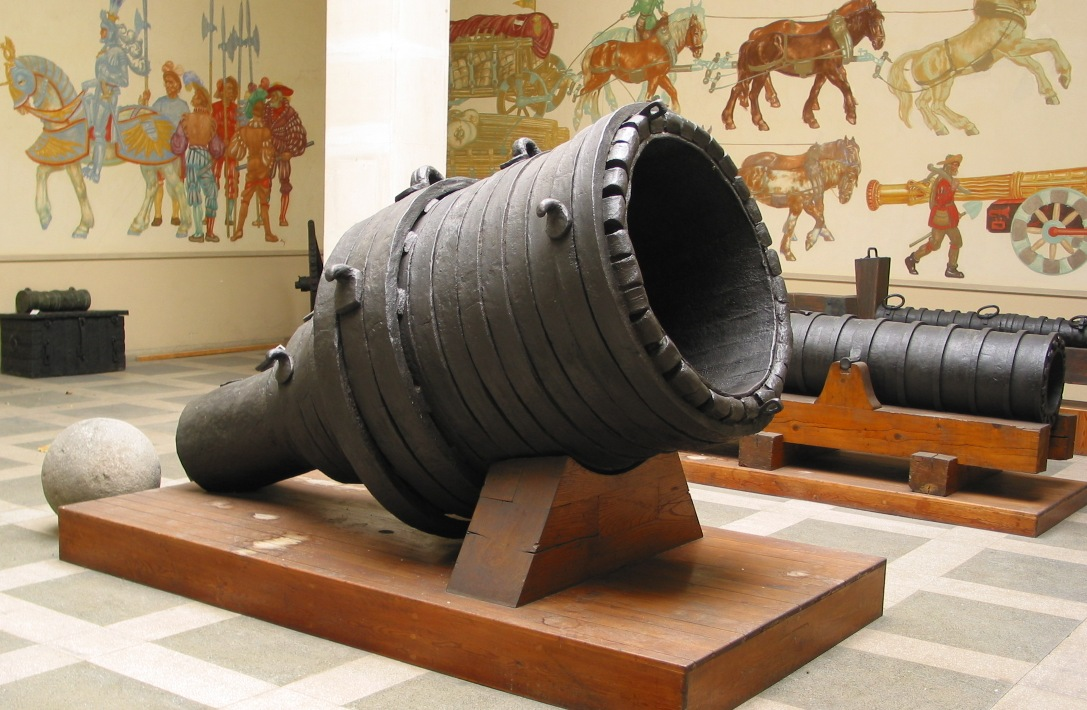
Pumhart von Steyr

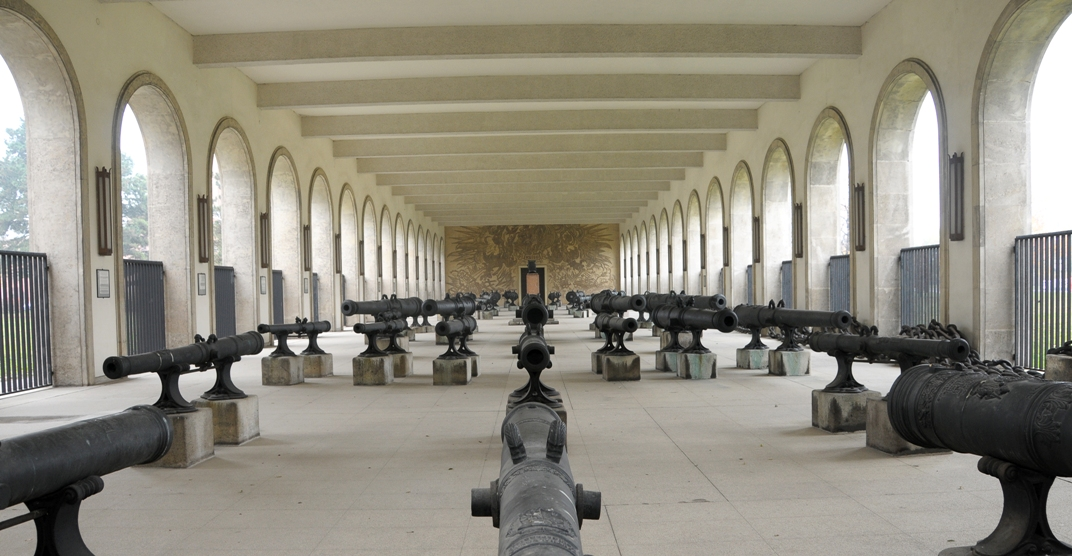
Artillery hall

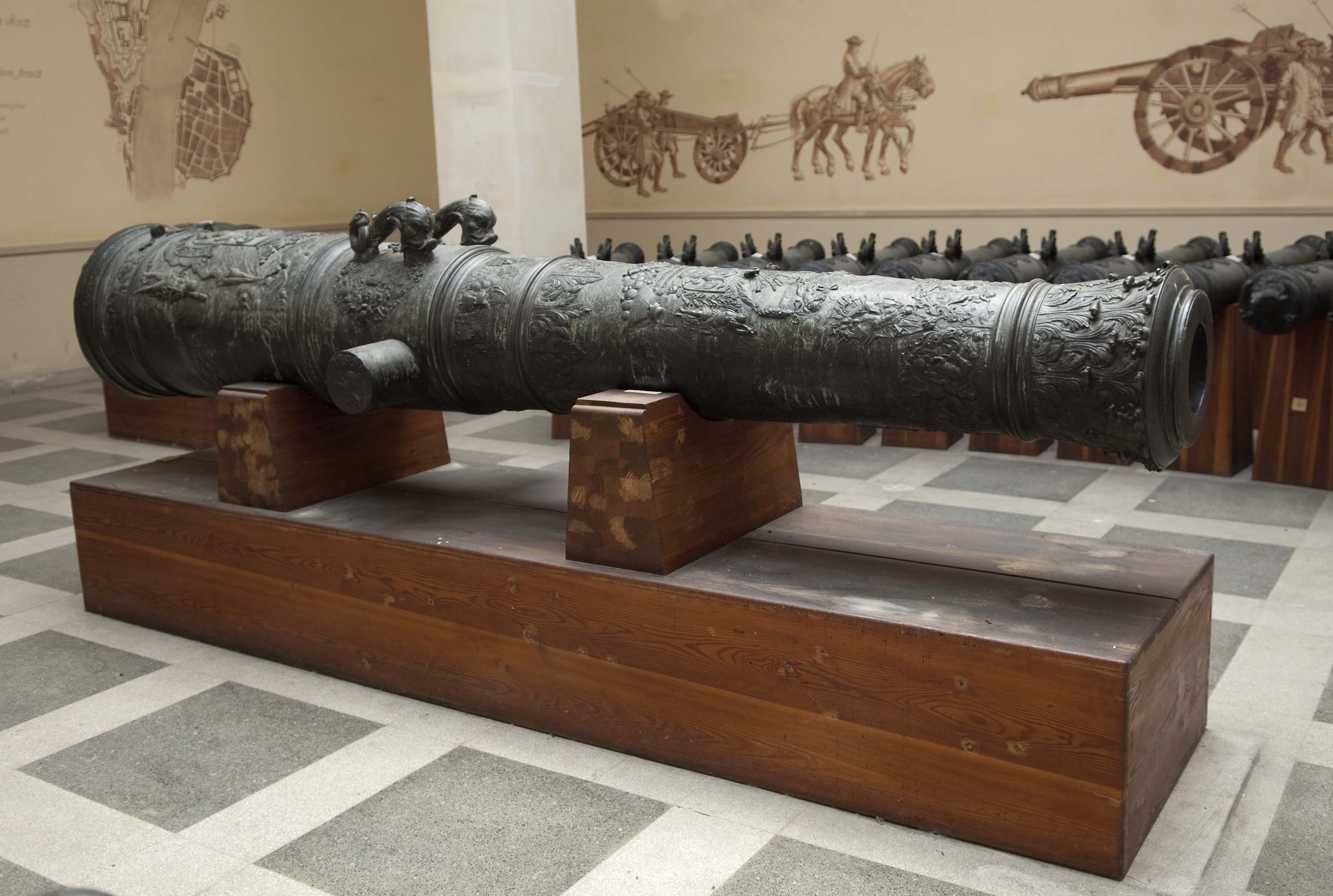
Kartouwe, 1669

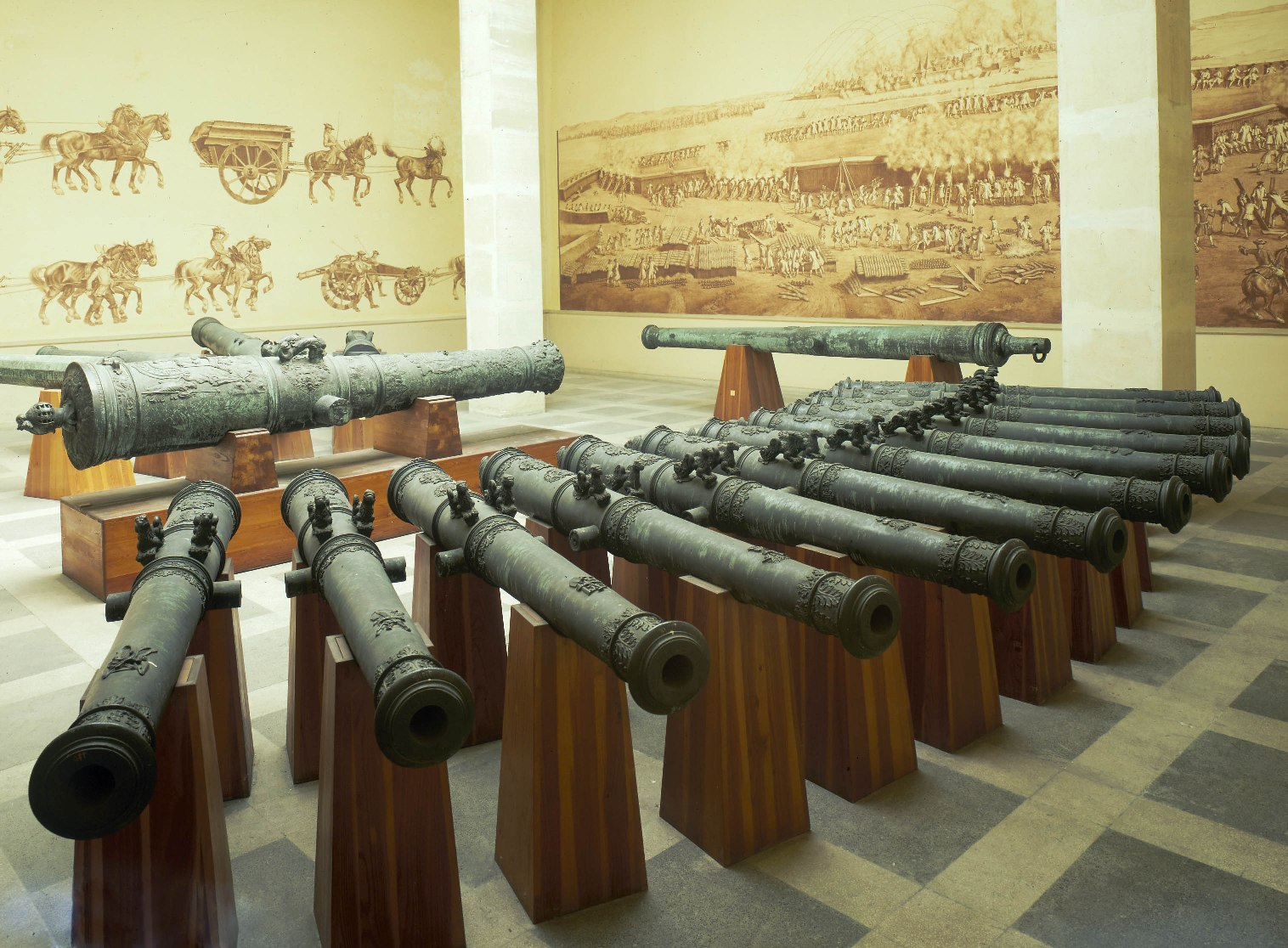
The Nuremberg Monatsrohre (month barrels)

A side chamber contains what is probably the historically most valuable part of the collection, the wrought-iron guns of the Middle Ages. These include the world-famous Pumhart von Steyr, a thousand-pound, 80 cm-calibre stone cannon from the early 15th century. This is the oldest gun from the Imperial armoury and one of the very few surviving huge medieval guns. The opposite chamber and the central area contain brass barrels in all sizes dating back to the 17th and 18th century. The right artillery hall (building 17) contains mostly foreign exhibits, such as Venetian and Turkish gun barrels, though French gun barrels - spoils from the Napoleonic Wars - are also on display. The two side chambers, on the other hand, feature Austrian gun barrels, including some early breech-loading guns. The frescos in the artillery halls are the work of various artists. Painter Hans Wulz, for instance, created the fresco titled Seizure of Utrecht by Maximilian I for building 17; portraitist and military painter Hugo von Bouvard decorated building 2 with illustrations of the medieval army and transportation systems, various military vehicles, and means of carriage from the Maximilian era. The opposite hall of the artillery hall in building 2 was designed by Arbert Janesch with the help of contemporary references from Jörg Kölderer's Artillerie Maximilians I.

== Events, information, special exhibitions, branches ==
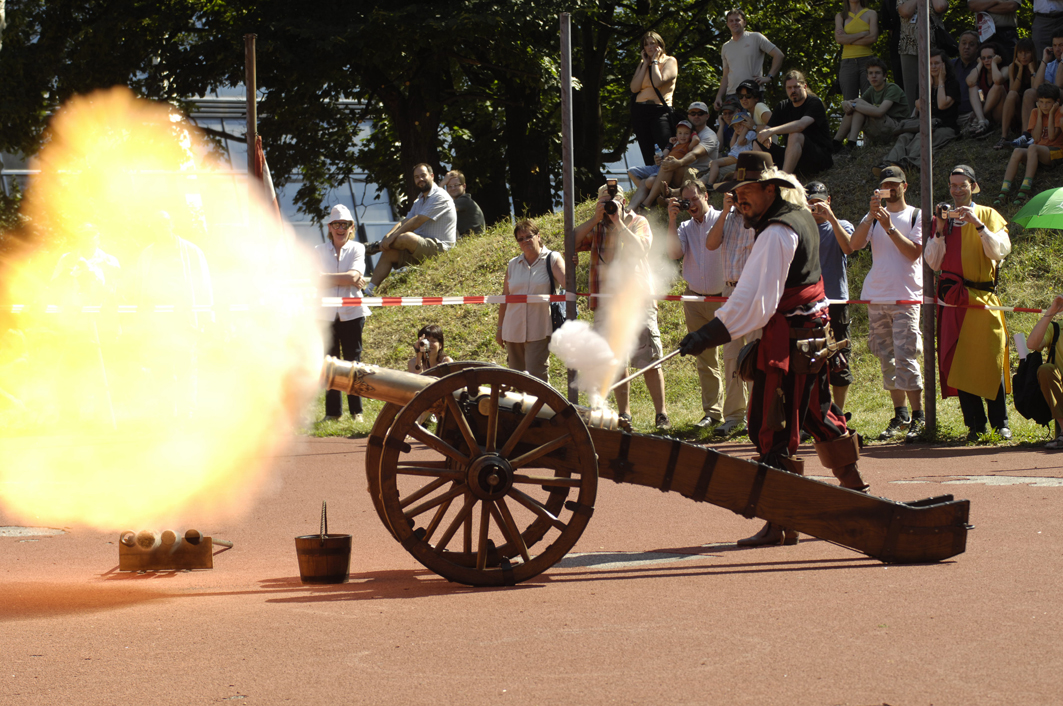
Montur und Pulverdampf 2007

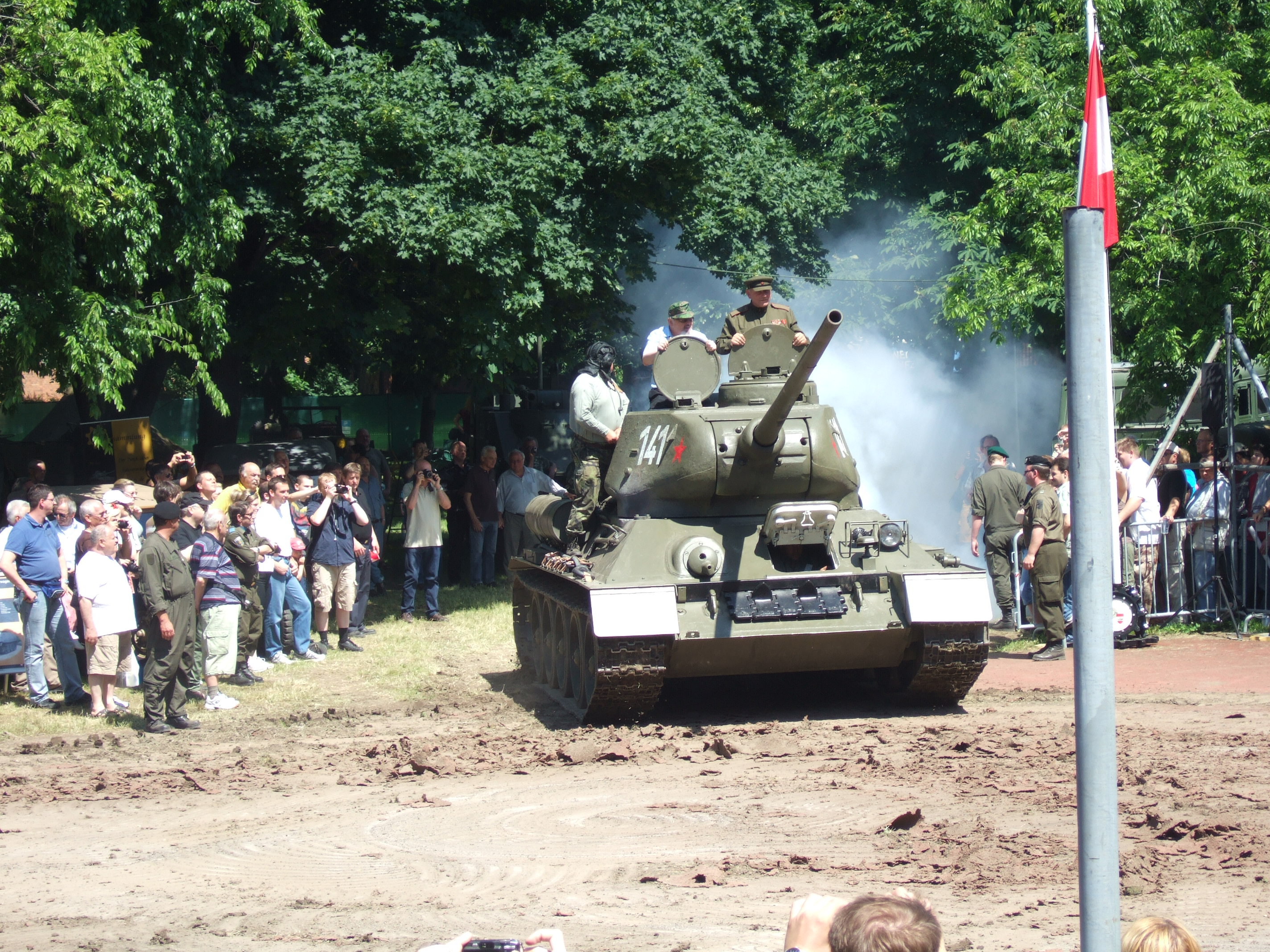
Operational Soviet T-34 battle tank from World War II during Auf Rädern und Ketten 2010

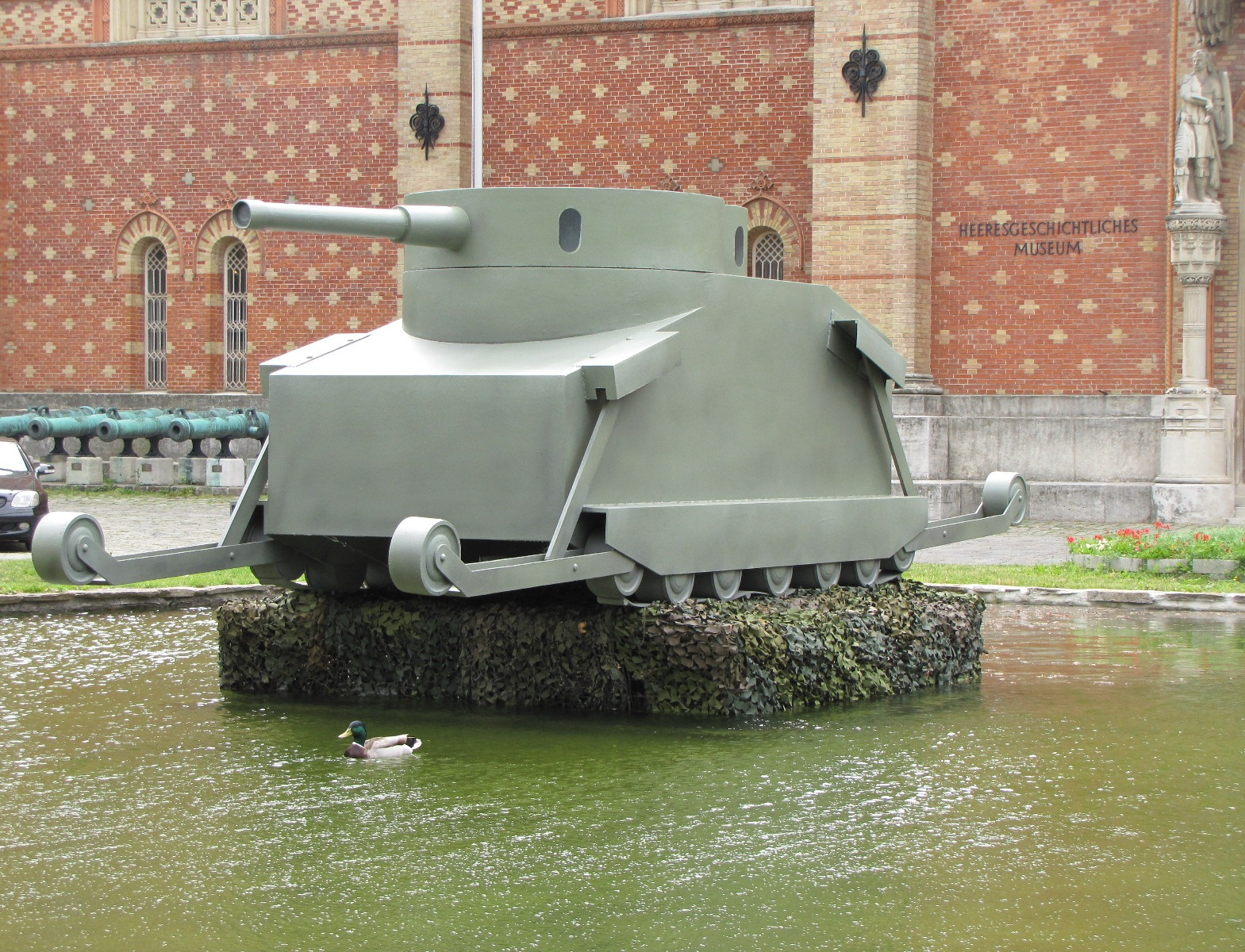
Model of the motorized gun by Gunther Burstyn (1879–1945) in front of the museum, on display as part of the special exhibition Projekt & Entwurf

=== Events ===
Thousands of visitors flock to the museum to see four major events:

- Go Modelling, an exhibition for scale models organised each year around mid-March by the International Plastic Modellers Society Austria (IPMS). The items on display include several models of historical military vehicles, aircraft, and ships built in true scale dimensions.
- Auf Rädern und Ketten (on wheels and chains), is a major gathering of historical military vehicles built until 1969, which takes place each year around the beginning of June. More than 100 vehicles from various branches of the military - from tanks to bicycles - are presented to the public in the outdoor area behind the museum building.
- Montur und Pulverdampf (Uniform and Gunpowder) a three-day festival of time-travel in military history from the Middle Ages to the present, which takes place each year between early and mid-July. The large outdoor area behind the museum serves as a stage for story tellers, historical battle re-enactments, craftsmen, traders, musicians, culinary delights, and a comprehensive children's programme.
- Mittelalterlicher Adventmarkt (Medieval Christmas market), is usually organised on a weekend in early December and draws up to 20,000 visitors. It involves a medieval Christmas market with jugglers, musicians, fencing performances, and trader's tents.

Apart from these large events, the museum regularly hosts fencing performances by the Rittersporn and Klingenspiel groups, as well as drill performances and gun salutes by the 2nd horse artillery division. Particular highlights during the year include the Long Night of Museums organised by the Austrian Broadcasting Corporation ORF, and events accompanying the Austrian National Day on 26 October.

=== Information ===
The museum is open daily from 9 am to 5 pm (except on New Year's Day, Easter Sunday, 1 May, All Saints' Day, and on 25 and 31 December). Admission is free of charge on the first Sunday of each month and on Austrian National Day (26 October). Each Sunday and holiday, museum employees offer guided tours on special historical eras and areas. Of great importance is the work of the museum's educational team, which offers a diversified children's and school programme for the different grades. Moreover, it is possible to organize children's birthday parties and other special events.

=== Special exhibitions ===
As a rule, the Heeresgeschichtliches Museum hosts a special exhibition twice a year on a military history theme. Past and present exhibitions include:

- Seelen der gewesenen Zeit - Historische Schätze der Bibliothek (Souls of past time - historical treasures of the library, 3 December 2013 to 31 August 2014)
- Dröhnende Motoren (Roaring engines, 7 September to 20 October 2013), Zeltweg Air Base
- Fliegen im Ersten Weltkrieg (Flying in World War I, 26 April to 20 October 2013), Zeltweg Air Base, Hangar 8
- WoMen at War – k.u.k. Frauenbilder 1914-1918 (14 March 2013 to 29 September 2013)
- Alexander Pock – Militärmalerei als Beruf (Alexander Pock - Military painting as a profession, 12 September 2012 to 13 January 2013)
- Kaiser Karl I. – Gesalbt, Geweiht, Gekrönt (Emperor Charles I, anointed, sacred, crowned, 12 April to 19 August 2012)
- Projekt & Entwurf – Militärische Innovationen aus fünf Jahrhunderten (Project & Conception - Military innovations from five centuries, 2011)
- Schutz und Hilfe – 50 Jahre Auslandseinsatz (Protection and Help - 50 years of foreign assignment, 2010)
- Bulgarien – Der unbekannte Verbündete (Bulgaria - the unknown ally, 2009)

=== Branches ===
- Patrol boats Oberst Brecht and Niederösterreich: In 2006, the Austrian Armed Forces committed the two Patrol boats to the Museum of Military History. The boats are now berthed in the shipyard of Korneuburg under the care of the Austrian Naval Force and are accessible to the public.
- Ungerberg bunker system near Bruckneudorf: since 2014, this largely preserved bunker system of the Austrian Armed Forces from the time of the Cold War has been accessible to the public as an open-air museum.
- Military aviation exhibition in the Zeltweg Air Base: Since 2005, 23 historical aircraft ranging from a Jak-18 to a Swedish Draken are on display in a 5,000 m^{2} exhibition area in Hangar 8. In addition, the exhibition includes aircraft motors and jet engines, air surveillance radar systems, flight equipment, anti-aircraft guns, historical vehicles of the air force, equipment of the Imperial German Army Air Service and signal corps, uniforms, flight suits, models, insignia, and historical photographs. Special exhibitions are also staged here, such as Fliegen im Ersten Weltkrieg (26 April to 20 October 2013) or Dröhnende Motoren (7 September to 20 October 2013).
- Collection of signalling equipment in the Starhemberg barracks: This collection contains a large number of historical signalling equipment, ranging from historically valuable exhibits from the 19th century, communications and coding technology from the Cold War, to state-of-the-art military communication equipment.

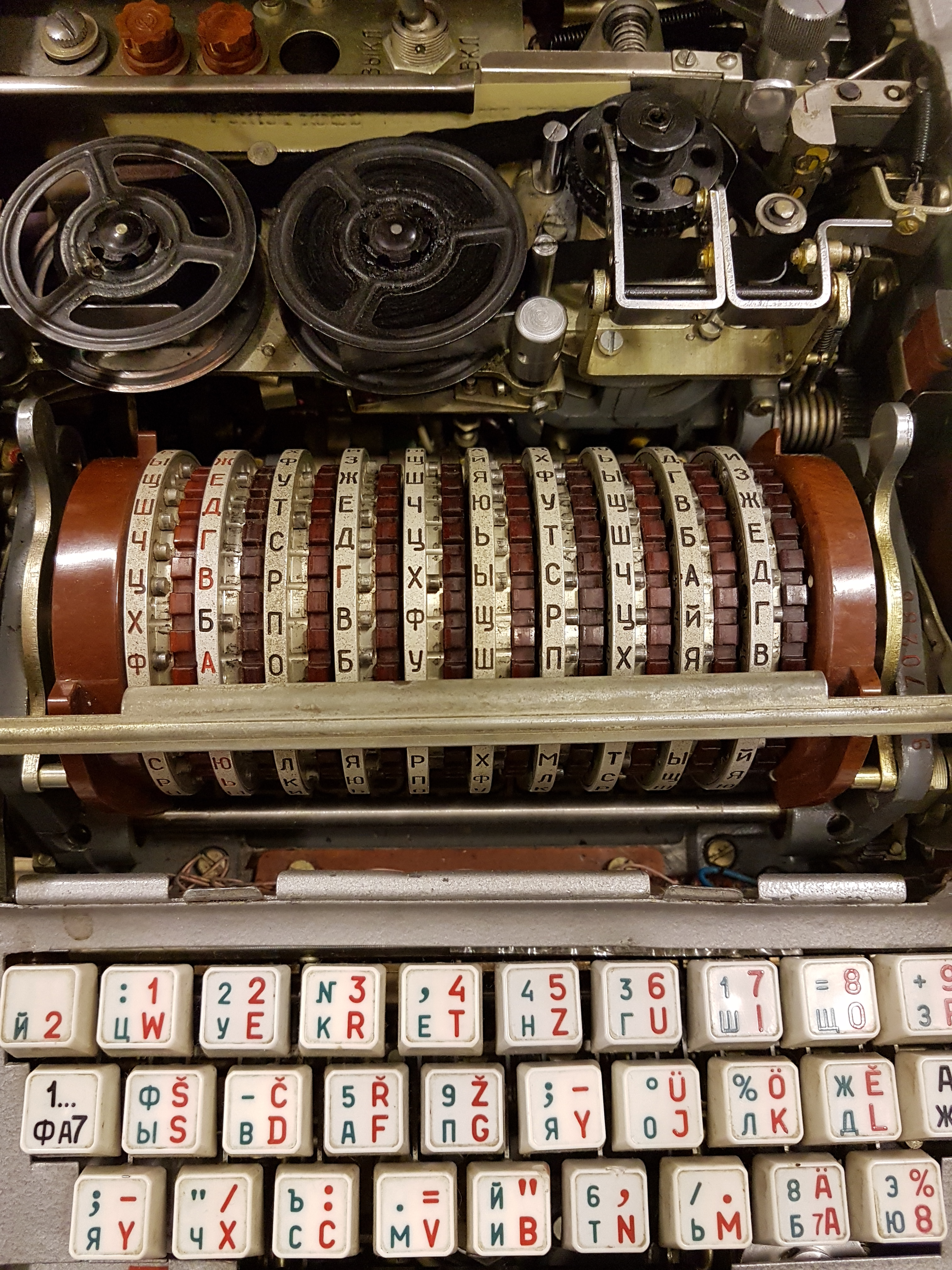
Russian Fialka rotary cypher machine, on display in the branch collection of signalling equipment

== Reception ==
=== Literature ===
- In his essays titled Eine Reise in das Innere von Wien, Austrian writer Gerhard Roth describes his impressions from a guided tour through the Heeresgeschichtliches Museum.

=== Film ===
- In 1993, historian Ernst Trost (narrator: Axel Corti) filmed the documentary Zwingburg und Ruhmeshalle. Das Wiener Arsenal, which mainly focuses on the Museum of Military History as the centrepiece of the Arsenal.
- Parts of the television film Kronprinz Rudolf, starring Max von Thun were shot in the Ruhmeshalle of the Museum of Military History in 2005.
- In January 2013, Karl Hohenlohe paid tribute to the Museum of Military History in the documentary Aus dem Rahmen by the special-interest channel ORF III of the Austrian Broadcasting Corporation.

== Miscellaneous ==
- The stately rooms of the Museum of Military History, i.e. the Feldherrenhalle and the Ruhmeshalle, can be rented for events and celebrations.
