= History of cannons =

The history of cannon spans several hundred years from the 12th century to modern times. The cannon first appeared in China sometime during the 12th and 13th centuries. It was most likely developed in parallel or as an evolution of an earlier gunpowder weapon called the fire lance. The result was a projectile weapon in the shape of a cylinder that fired projectiles using the explosive pressure of gunpowder. Cannons were used for warfare by the late 13th century in the Yuan dynasty and spread throughout Eurasia in the 14th century. During the Middle Ages, large and small cannons were developed for siege and field battles. The cannon replaced prior siege weapons such as the trebuchet. After the Middle Ages, most large cannons were abandoned in favor of greater numbers of lighter, more maneuverable field artillery. New defensive fortifications such as bastions and star forts were designed specifically to better withstand artillery sieges. Cannons transformed naval warfare with its deadly firepower, allowing vessels to destroy each other from long range. As rifling became more commonplace, the accuracy of the cannon was significantly improved, and they became deadlier than ever, especially to infantry. In World War I, a considerable majority of all deaths were caused by cannons; they were also used widely in World War II. Most modern cannons are similar to those used in the Second World War, including autocannons—with the exception of naval guns, which are now significantly smaller in caliber.

== Development in China ==
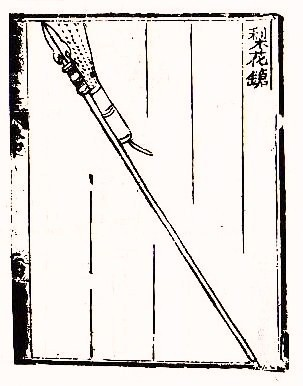
A fire lance as depicted in the Huolongjing.

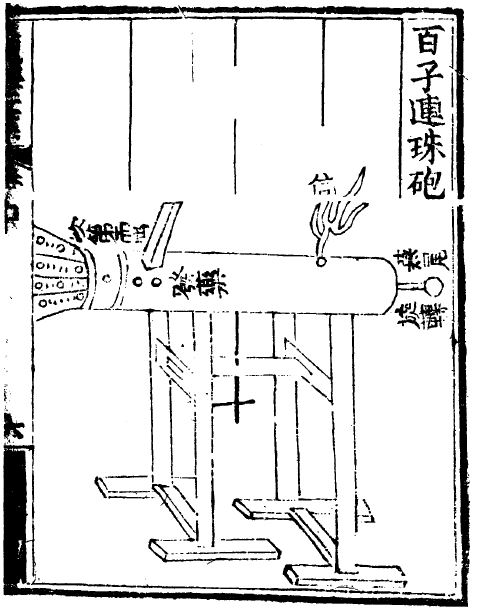
An "eruptor" as depicted in the Huolongjing. Essentially a fire lance on a frame, the 'multiple bullets magazine eruptor' shoots lead shots, which are loaded in a magazine and fed into the barrel when turned around on its axis.

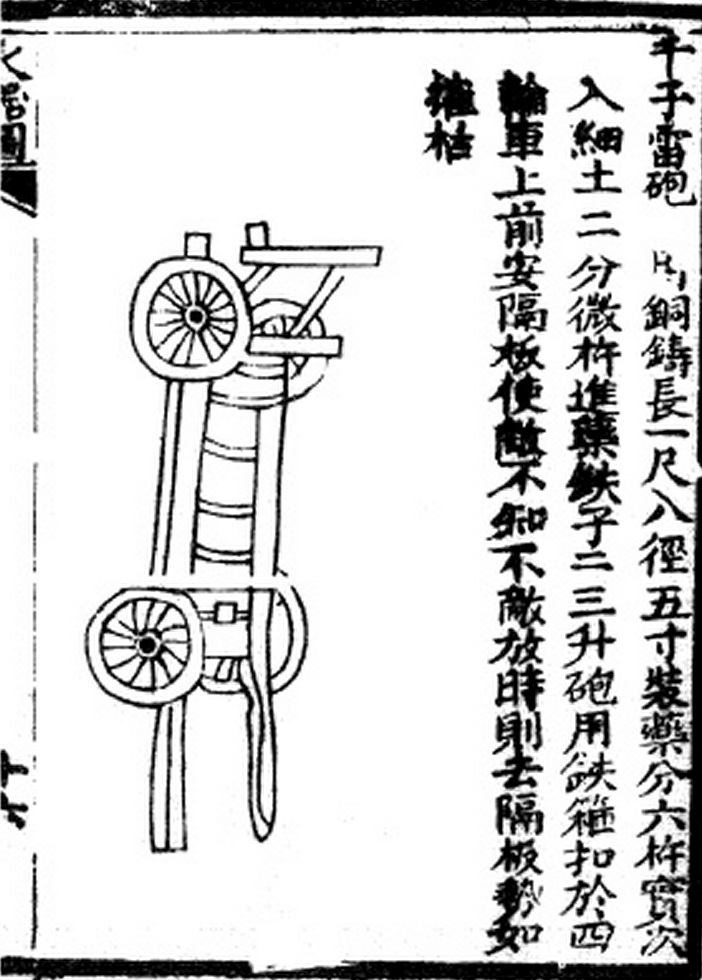
A bronze "thousand ball thunder cannon" from the 14th-century Ming dynasty book Huolongjing.

=== Fire lance ===
The cannon may have possibly appeared in China as early as the 12th century, but did not see wider use in the region until the 13th century. The cannon was likely a parallel development or evolution of the fire-lance, a 12th-century gunpowder weapon that combined a tube of gunpowder with a polearm weapon. This early fire lance is not considered a true gun because it did not include projectiles, whereas a gun by definition uses "the explosive force of the gunpowder to propel a projectile from a tube: cannons, muskets, and pistols are typical examples." However co-viative projectiles, which only partially occlude the barrel, such as iron scraps or porcelain shards were added at some point, and eventually, the paper and bamboo materials of fire lance barrels were replaced by metal. In 1259 a type of "fire-emitting lance" (tuhuoqiang 突火槍) made an appearance and according to the History of Song: "It is made from a large bamboo tube, and inside is stuffed a pellet wad (子窠). Once the fire goes off it completely spews the rear pellet wad forth, and the sound is like a bomb that can be heard for five hundred or more paces." The pellet wad mentioned is possibly the first true bullet in recorded history depending on how bullet is defined, as it did occlude the barrel, unlike previous co-viatives used in the fire lance.

=== Eruptor ===
Fire lances transformed from the "bamboo- (or wood- or paper-) barreled firearm to the metal-barreled firearm" to better withstand the explosive pressure of gunpowder. From there it branched off into several different gunpowder weapons known as "eruptors" in the late 12th and early 13th centuries, with different functions such as the "filling-the-sky erupting tube" which spewed out poisonous gas and porcelain shards, the "orifice-penetrating flying sand magic mist tube" (鑽穴飛砂神霧筒) which spewed forth sand and poisonous chemicals into orifices, and the more conventional "phalanx-charging fire gourd" which shot out lead pellets. These eruptors were more cannon-like but only shot shrapnel and shells.

=== Cannon ===
The earliest known depiction of a cannon is a sculpture from the Dazu Rock Carvings in Sichuan, dated to 1128, that portrays a figure carrying a vase-shaped bombard, firing flames and a cannonball. The oldest surviving gun bearing a date of production is the Xanadu Gun, dated to 1298. Other specimens have been dated to even earlier periods, such as the Wuwei Bronze Cannon, to 1227, and the Heilongjiang hand cannon, to 1288. However, they contain no inscriptions. The Wuwei Bronze Cannon was discovered in 1980 and may possibly be the oldest as well as largest cannon of the 13th century: a 100-centimeter 108-kilogram bronze cannon discovered in a cellar in Wuwei, Gansu Province, it contains no inscription, but has been dated by historians to the late Western Xia period between 1214 and 1227. The gun contained an iron ball about nine centimeters in diameter, which is smaller than the muzzle diameter at twelve centimeters, and 0.1 kilograms of gunpowder in it when discovered, meaning that the projectile might have been another co-viative. The Heilongjiang hand cannon was discovered in Heilongjiang, in northeastern China. It is 3.5 kilograms, 34 cm (Needham says 35 cm), and has a bore of approximately 2.5 cm (1 in). Based on contextual evidence, historians believe it was used by Yuan forces against a rebellion by Mongol prince Nayan in 1287. The History of Yuan states that a Jurchen commander known as Li Ting led troops armed with hand cannon into battle against Nayan, scoring two victories, one in 1287 and another in early 1288. Another specimen, dated to 1332, has a muzzle bore diameter of 10.5 cm (4 in).

Li Ting personally led a detachment of ten brave soldiers holding huo pao, and in a night attack penetrated the enemy's camp. Then they let off the pao, which caused great damage, and such confusion that the enemy soldiers attacked and killed each other, flying 'in all directions'... Li Ting chose gun-soldiers (chong zi), concealing those who bore the huo pao on their backs; then by night he crossed the river, moved upstream, and fired off (the weapons). This threw all the enemy's horses and men into great confusion... and he gained a great victory.

— History of Yuan

According to the Taiheiki, during the Mongol invasions of Japan, enemy troops used a weapon shaped like a bell that made a noise like thunder-clap and shot out thousands of iron balls.

The Red Turban Rebellion saw the application of arrow-firing cannons to both siege and naval warfare in the conflict. During the Siege of Shaoxing of 1358–9, the Ming army attacked the city and the defenders "used ... fire tubes to attack the enemy's advance guard". The siege was won by the defenders, whose "fire tubes went off all at once, and the [attacker's] great army could not stand against them and had to withdraw." In 1363 Chen Youliang failed to take Nanchang due to the defenders' use of cannons and was forced to set up a blockade in an attempt to starve them out. In the Siege of Suzhou of 1366, the Ming army fielded 2,400 large and small cannons in addition to 480 trebuchets, but neither were able to breach the city walls despite "the noise of the guns and the paos went day and night and didn't stop." Cannons were also used on the frontier as garrison artillery from 1412 onwards.

Cannons were also used on board naval vessels. In the Battle of Lake Poyang on 29 August 1363, Zhu Yuanzhang's fleet arrived armed with "fire bombs, fire guns, fire arrows, fire seeds [probably grenades], large and small fire lances, large and small 'commander' fire-tubes, large and small iron bombs, rockets." His fleet engaged Chen's under orders to "get close to the enemy's ships and first set off gunpowder weapons (發火器), then bows and crossbows, and finally attack their ships with short range weapons." However it was fire bombs hurled using ship mounted trebuchets that succeeded in "burning twenty or more enemy vessels and killing or drowning many enemy troops." Zhu eventually came out victorious by ramming and burning the enemy fleet with fire ships. While guns were used during the battle, ultimately they were not pivotal to success, and the battle was won using incendiary weapons.

After emerging victorious over the other rebels and Mongol forces, the Hongwu Emperor created a Bureau of Armaments (軍器局). It was tasked with producing every three years 3,000 handheld bronze guns, 3,000 signal cannons, and ammunition as well as accoutrements such as ramrods. His Armory Bureau (兵仗局) was responsible for producing types of guns known as "great generals," "secondary generals," "tertiary generals," and "gate-seizing generals." Other firearms such as "miraculous [fire] lances," "miraculous guns," and "horse-beheading guns" were also produced. It is unclear what proportion or how many of each type were actually manufactured.

In 1388 cannons were used against war elephants successfully during the Ming–Mong Mao War and again in 1421 during the Lam Sơn uprising. In 1414 the Ming army clashed with an Oirat force near the Tuul River and frightened them so much with their guns that the Oirats fled without their spare horses, only to be ambushed by concealed Chinese guns. According to a Chinese observer the Oirats avoided battle several days later, "fearing that the guns had arrived again."

Ming dynasty artillery included a vase shaped "long range awe inspiring" cannon dated from 1350 and found in the 14th century treatise Huolongjing. Another cannon included in the treatise called the bronze "thousand ball thunder cannon" is not vase shaped, showing an advance in metallurgy that made thickening the explosion chamber unnecessary. It is also depicted with a wheeled carriage, making it perhaps the earliest piece of field artillery. According to the Huolongjing, it was cast from bronze, fastened with iron hoops to a four-wheeled carriage, with a wooden shield placed in front to hide it from the enemy, only to be removed when firing.

Early Ming cannons coalesced into a few typical designs. There was the crouching tiger cannon, a small cannon fitted with a metal collar and two legs for support. There was a middling cannon known as the "awe-inspiring long range cannon", which added a sight and weighed around 85 kilograms. Larger cannons such as the great general and great divine cannon were also developed and at least 300 of them were being made in 1465. The muzzle loading wrought iron "great general cannon" (大將軍炮) weighed up to 360 kilograms and could fire a 4.8 kilogram lead ball. Its heavier variant, the "great divine cannon" (大神銃), could weigh up to 600 kilograms and was capable of firing several iron balls and upward of a hundred iron shots at once. These were the last indigenous Chinese cannon designs prior to the incorporation of European models in the 16th century.

== Spread ==
=== Medieval Europe ===
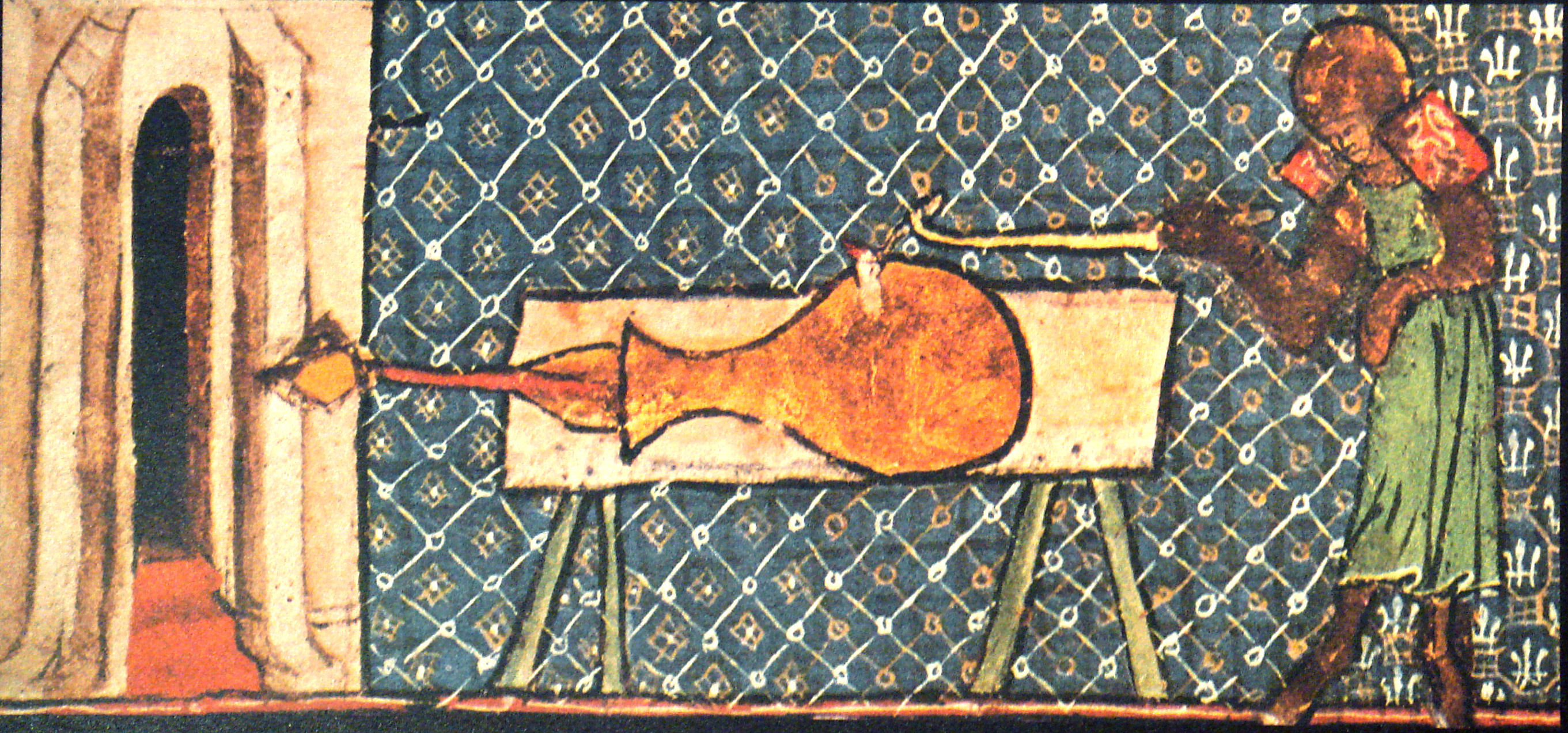
Earliest picture of a European cannon: a vase gun on a wooden trestle firing a large bolt. "De Nobilitatibus Sapientii Et Prudentiis Regum" by Walter de Milemete, 1326

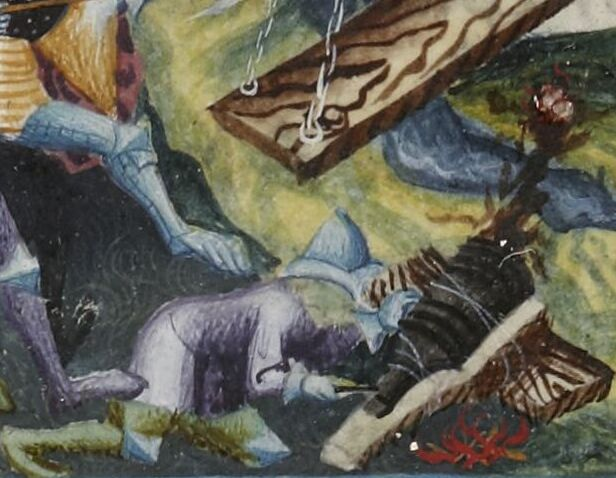
Early depiction of a bombard in action. "Grandes Chroniques de France", 1390–1405

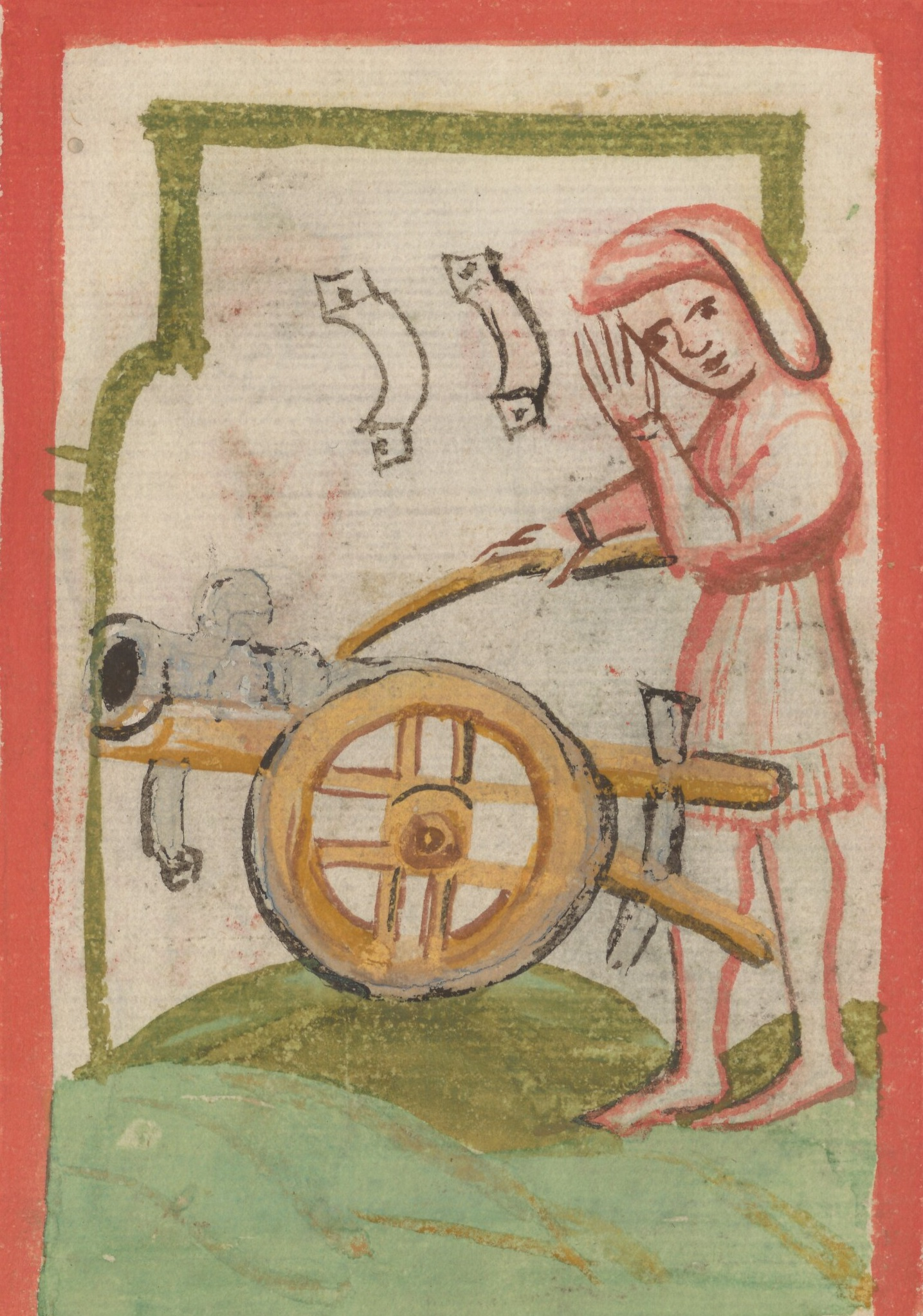
A bombard on a wheeled carriage with hingable bed. "Büchsenmeisterbuch", early 15th century.

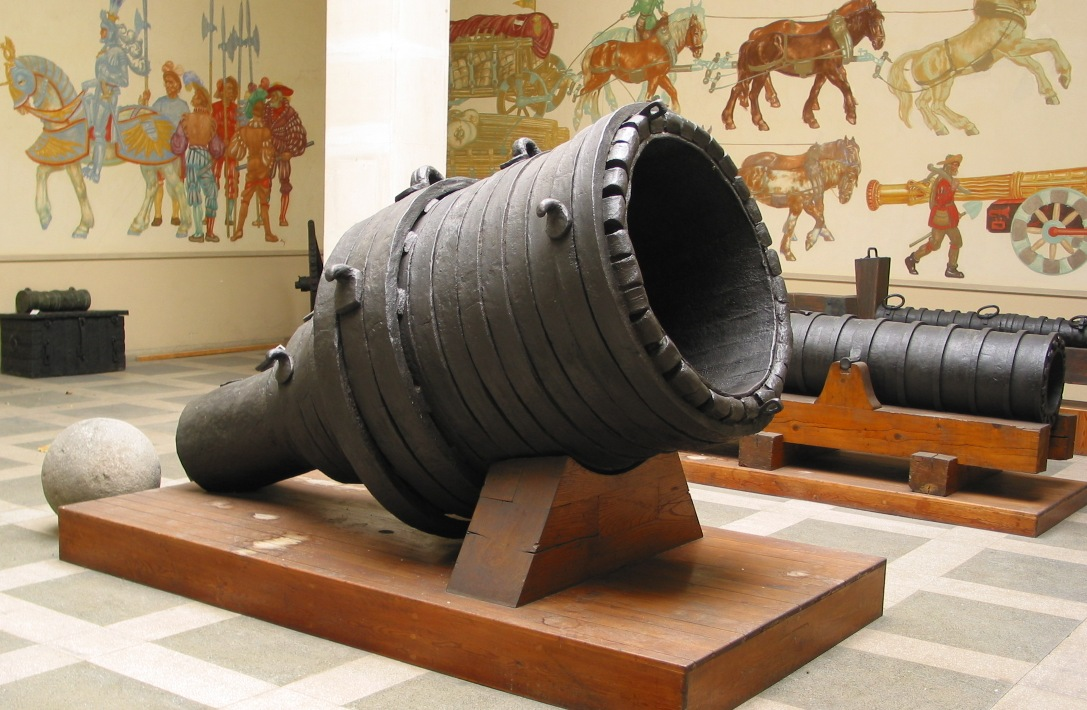
The Pumhart von Steyr from the early 15th century. At the turn of the 15th century most giant bombards still had comparatively short barrels.

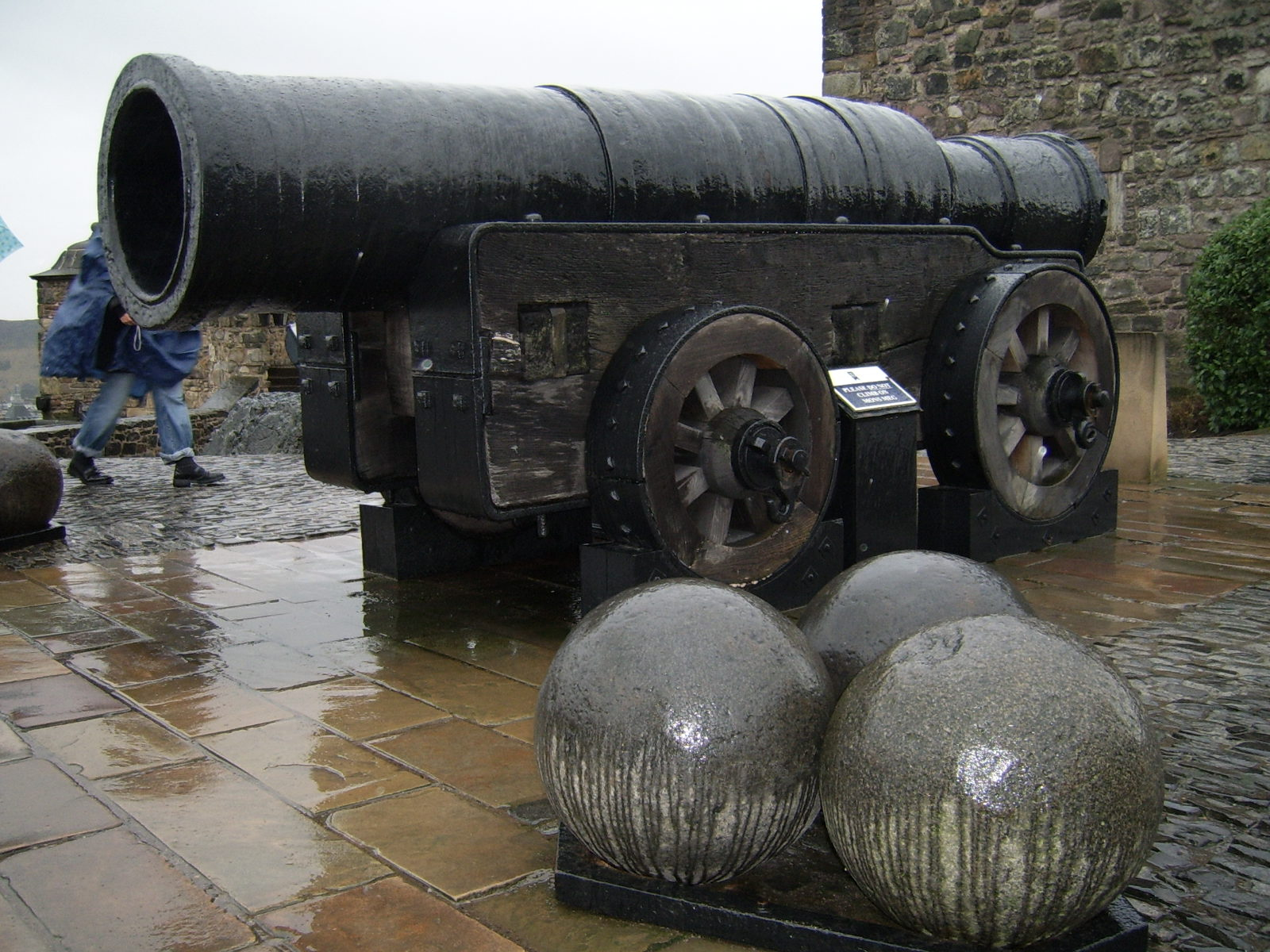
The Mons Meg from 1444 on a 19th-century wheeled carriage. Giant bombards with elongated gun barrels appeared in about 1430.

The earliest European references to gunpowder are found in Roger Bacon's Opus Majus from 1267.

The earliest known European depiction of a cannon appeared in a manuscript by Walter de Milemete dated to 1326. Although not necessarily drawn by him, known as De Nobilitatibus, sapientii et prudentiis regum (Concerning the Majesty, Wisdom, and Prudence of Kings), it displays a cannon loaded with a large arrow emerging from it and its user lowering a long stick to ignite the cannon through the touch hole. Another similar illustration dated to 1326 shows a darker gun being set off by a group of knights, which also featured in another work of de Milemete's, De secretis secretorum Aristotelis. On 11 February of that same year, the Signoria of Florence appointed two officers to obtain canones de mettallo and ammunition for the town's defense. In the following year a document from the Turin area recorded a certain amount was paid "for the making of a certain instrument or device made by Friar Marcello for the projection of pellets of lead."

The pot-de-fer's bolt was probably wrapped in leather to allow greater thrusting power, it was set off through a touch hole with a heated wire. This weapon, and others similar, were used by both the French and English, during the Hundred Years' War, when cannons saw their first real use on the European battlefield. Even then, cannons were still a relatively rare weapon. The French raiding party that sacked and burned Southampton in 1338 brought with them a ribaudequin and 48 bolts (but only 3 pounds of gunpowder). By 1341 the town of Lille had a "tonnoire master", and a tonnoire was an arrow-hurling gun. In 1345, two iron cannons were present in Toulouse. In 1346 Aix-la-Chapelle too possessed iron cannons, which shot arrows (busa ferrea ad sagittandum tonitrum). "Ribaldis," which shot large arrows and simplistic grapeshot, were first mentioned in the English Privy Wardrobe accounts during preparations for the Battle of Crécy, between 1345 and 1346. The Florentine Giovanni Villani recounts their destructiveness, indicating that by the end of the battle, "the whole plain was covered by men struck down by arrows and cannon balls." Similar cannons were also used at the Siege of Calais, in the same year, although it was not until the 1380s that the "ribaudekin" clearly became mounted on wheels. By 1350 Petrarch wrote that the presence of cannons on the battlefield was 'as common and familiar as other kinds of arms'.

The first cannon appeared in Russia around 1380, though they were used only in sieges, often by the defenders. Around the same period, the Byzantine Empire began to accumulate its own cannons to face the Ottoman threat, starting with medium-sized cannons 3 feet (0.91 m) long and of 10 in caliber. The first definite use of artillery in the region was against the Ottoman siege of Constantinople, in 1396, forcing the Ottomans to withdraw. They acquired their own cannons, and laid siege to the Byzantine capital again, in 1422, using "falcons", which were short but wide cannons. Before the siege of Constantinople, it was known that the Ottomans had the ability to cast medium-sized cannons, but the range of some pieces they were able to field far surpassed the defenders' expectations. Instrumental to this Ottoman advancement in arms production was a somewhat mysterious figure by the name of Orban (Urban), a Hungarian (though some suggest he was German). One cannon designed by Orban was named "Basilica" and was 27 feet (8.2 m) long, and able to hurl a 600 lb (272 kg) stone ball over a mile (1.6 km).

The master founder initially tried to sell his services to the Byzantines, who were unable to secure the funds needed to hire him. Orban then left Constantinople and approached Mehmed II, claiming that his weapon could blast 'the walls of Babylon itself'. Orban labored for four months at Edirne to create a six-meter (20-foot) long cannon, which required hundreds of pounds of gunpowder to fire, and its stone projectiles weighed between 550 (12 short cwt, 11 Imp. cwt) and 800 kilograms (16.6 short cwt, 15.75 Imp. cwt). The gun's projectiles were reported to have flown for a mile before landing, and shook the entire ground when fired, the roar blasting four miles away. It had to be transported by 30 wagons pulled by 60 oxen, with the assistance of 200 handlers. An additional 50 carpenters and 200 laborers helped in the transport by leveling terrain and building bridges. During the actual siege of Constantinople the gun proved to be somewhat underwhelming. The aiming process was laborious and after each shot it required hot oil ointment for cooling. Its rate of fire was once every three hours, and may have even suffered damage from cracks early on, never to be repaired.

Fortunately for the Ottomans it wasn't Mehmed's only cannon. Dozens of other large cannons alongside 500 smaller cannons bombarded Constantinople's walls in their weakest sections for 55 days. A Greek contemporary, Kritoboulos, describes the scene thus, "The stone, borne with tremendous force and velocity, hit the wall, which it immediately shook and knocked down, and was itself broken into many fragments and scattered, hurling the pieces everywhere and killing those who happened by be near by. Sometimes it demolished a whole section, and sometimes a half-section, and sometimes a larger or smaller section of a tower or turret or battlement. And there was no part of the wall strong enough or resistant enough or thick enough to be able to withstand it, or to wholly resist such force and such a blow of the stone cannon-ball." Mehmed's smaller artillery pieces also proved effective. Constantinople's defenders wielded their own formidable guns and "fired … five or ten bullets at a time, each about the size of a … walnut, and having a great power of penetration. If one of these hit an armed man it would go right through his shield and his body and go on to hit anyone else who happened to be in his way, and even a third, until the force of the powder diminished; so one shot might hit two or three men." Despite the fierce defense, the city's fortifications were ultimately overwhelmed in a final assault and the sultan won the siege.

=== Southeast Asia ===
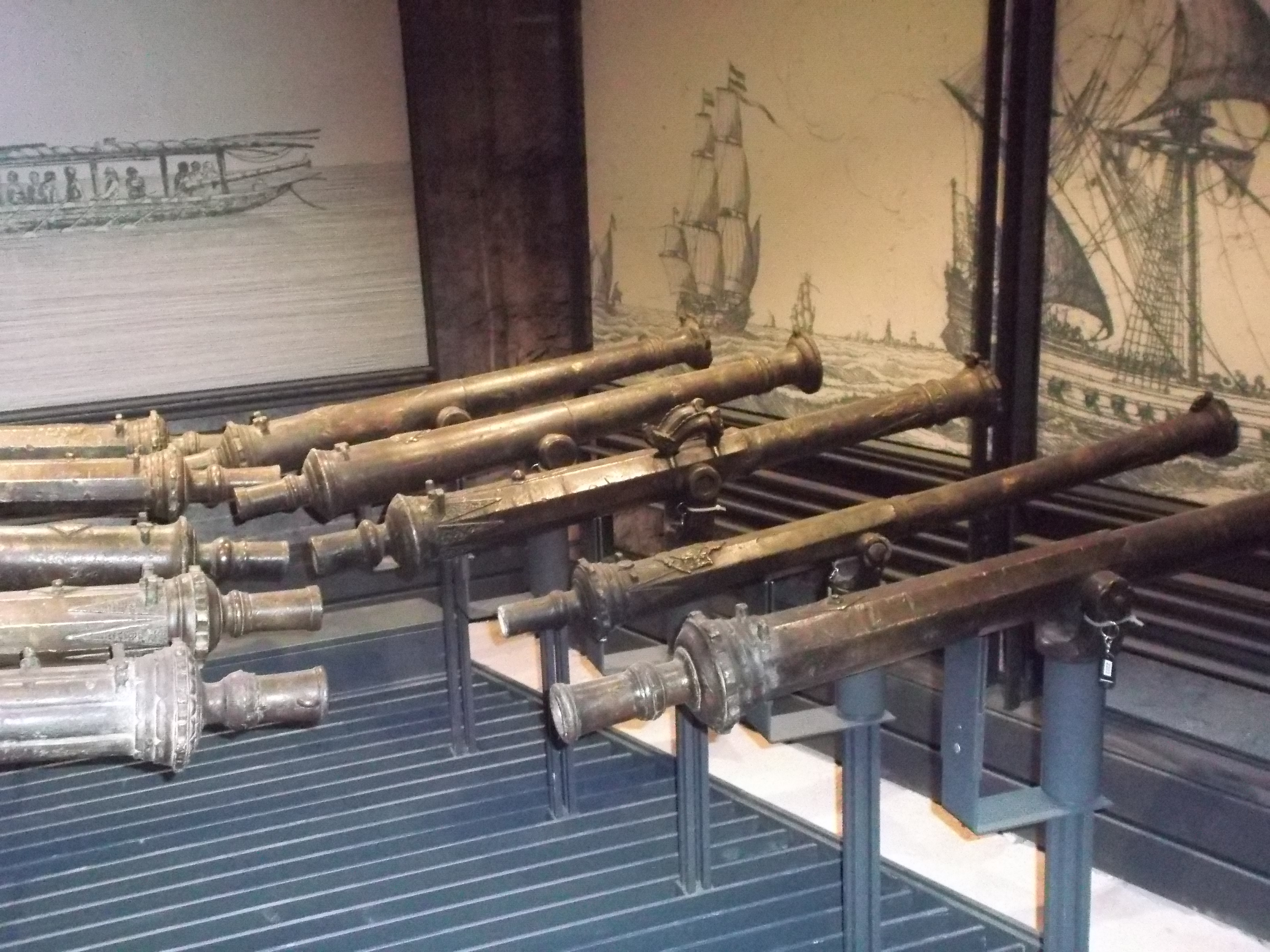
Collection of Philippine lantaka in a European museum

Mongol troops of Yuan dynasty carried Chinese cannons to Java during their 1293 invasion. Cannons were used by the Ayutthaya Kingdom in 1352 during its invasion of the Khmer Empire. Within a decade large quantities of gunpowder could be found in the Khmer Empire.

Vietnam's Lý dynasty had begun using gunpowder weapons such as the fire arrow (hỏa tiễn) during the Lý–Song War (1075 – 1077) at the siege of Yongzhou. Around the 1260s, the Vietnamese used a weapon called the thủ pháo, which was a small bamboo tube with one side closed and a small hole for the fuse that ignited the gunpowder and fired a sharp piece of iron. In 1390, the King of Champa, Po Binasuor, and his army were ambushed and killed by cannons of Vietnamese prince Trần Khát Chân while Champa was attacking Đại Việt.

When the Portuguese first came to Malacca (1509), they found a large colony of Javanese merchants under their own headmen; they were manufacturing their own cannons, which is deemed as important as sails in a ship.

By the early 16th century, the Javanese were locally-producing large guns, some of them still survived until the present day and dubbed as "sacred cannons" or "holy cannons". These cannons varied between 180- and 260-pounders, weighing anywhere between 3 and 8 tons, length of them between 3 and 6 m (9.8 and 19.7 ft).

=== Islamic world ===
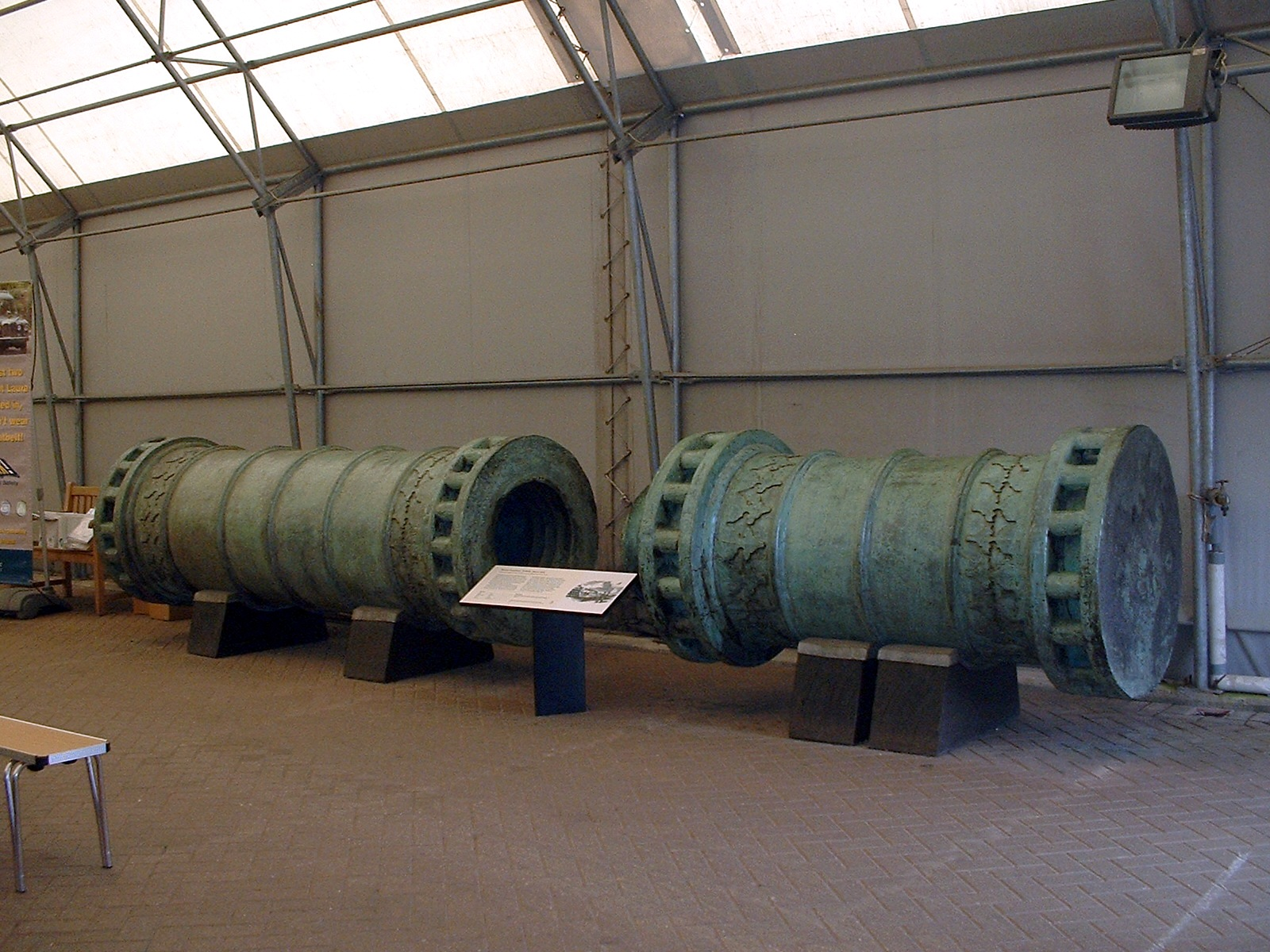
The Dardanelles Gun, a 1464 Ottoman bombard

According to historian Ahmad Y. al-Hassan, during the Battle of Ain Jalut in 1260, the Mamluks used a cannon against the Mongols. He claims that this was "the first cannon in history" and used a gunpowder formula almost identical to the ideal composition for explosive gunpowder. He also argues that this was not known in China or Europe until much later. Hassan further claims that the earliest textual evidence of cannons is from the Middle East, based on earlier originals which report hand-held cannons being used by the Mamluks at the Battle of Ain Jalut in 1260. However, Hassan's claims contradict earlier claims from the historians David Ayalon, Iqtidar Alam Khan, Joseph Needham, Tonio Andrade and Gabor Ágoston. Khan (1996) argued that it was the Mongols who introduced gunpowder to the Islamic world, and believed cannons only reached Mamluk Egypt in the 1370s. According to Needham (1986), the term midfa, dated to textual sources from 1342 to 1352, did not refer to true hand-guns or bombards, and contemporary accounts of a metal-barrel cannon in the Islamic world do not occur until 1365. Similarly, Andrade dates the textual appearance of cannons in middle eastern sources to the 1360s. Gabor Ágoston and David Ayalon believed the Mamluks had certainly used siege cannons by the 1360s, but earlier uses of cannons in the Islamic World are vague with a possible appearance in the Emirate of Granada by the 1320s and 1330s, however evidence is inconclusive.

Ibn Khaldun reported the use of cannons as siege machines by the Marinid sultan Abu Yaqub Yusuf at the siege of Sijilmasa in 1274. The passage by Ibn Khaldun on the Marinid Siege of Sijilmassa in 1274 occurs as follows: "[The Sultan] installed siege engines … and gunpowder engines …, which project small balls of iron. These balls are ejected from a chamber … placed in front of a kindling fire of gunpowder; this happens by a strange property which attributes all actions to the power of the Creator." However the source is not contemporary and was written a century later around 1382. Its interpretation has been rejected as anachronistic by historians, notably Ágoston and Peter Purton who urge caution regarding claims of Islamic firearms use in the 1204–1324 period as late medieval Arabic texts used the same word for gunpowder, naft, as they did for an earlier incendiary, naphtha.

References to early use of firearms in Islamdom (1204, 1248, 1274, 1258-60, 1303 and 1324) must be taken with caution since terminology used for gunpowder and firearms in late medieval Arabic sources is confused. Furthermore, most of these testimonies are given by later chroniclers of the fifteenth century whose use of terminology may have reflected their own time rather than that of the events they were writing about.

— Gabor Ágoston

It's not certain when the Ottomans started using firearms, however it's argued that they had been using cannons since the Battles of Kosovo (1389) and Nukap (1396) and most certainly by the 1420s. Some argue that field guns only entered service shortly after the Battle of Varna (1444) and more certainly used in the Second Battle of Kosovo (1448). The arquebus reached them around 1425. Super-sized bombards were used by the troops of Mehmed II to capture Constantinople, in 1453. Jim Bradbury argues that Urban, a Hungarian cannon engineer, introduced this cannon from Central Europe to the Ottoman realm. According to Paul Hammer, however, it could have been introduced from other Islamic countries which had earlier used cannons. It could fire heavy stone balls a mile, and the sound of their blast could reportedly be heard from a distance of 10 miles (16 km).

A piece of slightly later date, the Dardanelles Gun (see picture), was cast in bronze and made in two parts: the chase and the breech, which, together, weighed 18.4 tonnes. The two parts were screwed together using levers to facilitate the work. Created by Munir Ali in 1464, the Dardanelles Gun was still present for duty more than 300 years later in 1807, when a Royal Navy force appeared and commenced the Dardanelles Operation. Turkish forces loaded the ancient relics with propellant and projectiles, then fired them at the British ships. The British squadron suffered 28 dead through this bombardment.

=== East Asia ===
Korea began producing gunpowder in 1374 and were using cannons against Japanese pirates by the 1380s. By 1410, 160 Korean ships were reported to have equipped artillery of some sort. Mortars firing thunder-crash bombs are known to have been used, and four types of cannons are mentioned: chonja (heaven), chija (earth), hyonja (black), and hwangja (yellow), but their specifications are unknown. These cannons typically shot wooden arrows tipped with iron, the longest of which were nine feet long, but stone and iron balls were sometimes used as well. Mounted bronze guns that shot iron-fletched darts were also used in a cart style weapon that was the early hwacha.

Firearms seem to have been known in Japan around 1270 as proto-cannon invented in China, which the Japanese called teppō (鉄砲 lit. "iron cannon"). Gunpowder weaponry exchange between China and Japan was slow and only a small number of hand guns ever reached Japan. However the use of gunpowder bombs in the style of Chinese explosives is known to have occurred in Japan from at least the mid-15th century onward. The first recorded appearance of the cannon in Japan was in 1510 when a Buddhist monk presented Hōjō Ujitsuna with a teppō iron cannon that he had acquired during his travels in China. Firearms saw very little use in Japan until Portuguese matchlocks were introduced in 1543. During the Japanese invasions of Korea (1592–1598), the forces of Toyotomi Hideyoshi effectively utilized matchlock firearms against the Korean forces of Joseon, although they would ultimately be defeated and forced to withdraw from the Korean Peninsula.

== Early modern period ==
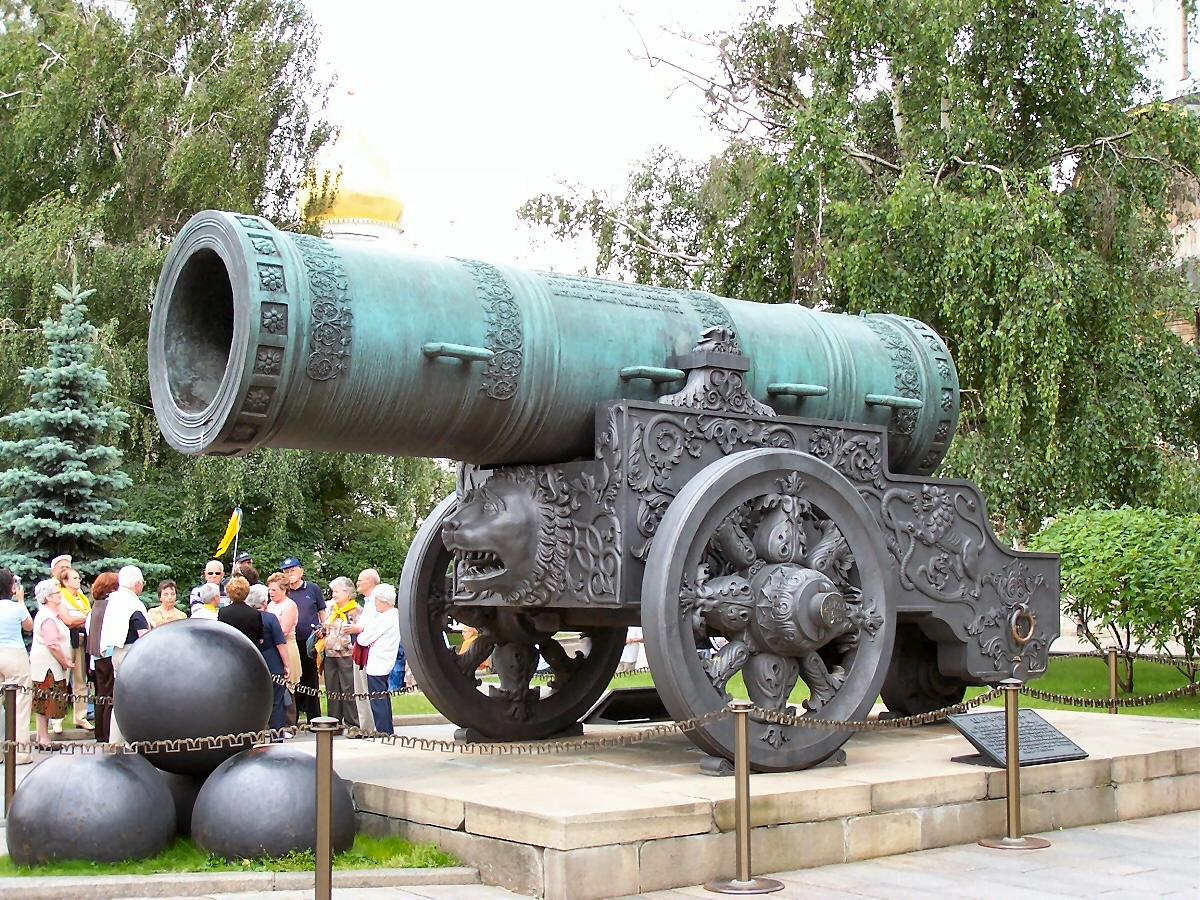
The Tsar Cannon, the largest howitzer ever made, cast by Andrey Chokhov

By the 16th century, cannons were made in a great variety of lengths and bore diameters, but the general rule was that the longer the barrel, the longer the range. Some cannons made during this time had barrels exceeding 10 ft (3.0 m) in length, and could weigh up to 20,000 pounds (9,100 kg). Consequently, large amounts of gunpowder were needed, to allow them to fire stone balls several hundred yards. By mid-century, European monarchs began to classify cannons to reduce the confusion. Henry II of France opted for six sizes of cannons, but others settled for more; the Spanish used twelve sizes, and the English sixteen. Better powder had been developed by this time as well. Instead of the finely ground powder used by the first bombards, powder was replaced by a "corned" variety of coarse grains. This coarse powder had pockets of air between grains, allowing fire to travel through and ignite the entire charge quickly and uniformly.

The end of the Middle Ages saw the construction of larger, more powerful cannons, as well their spread throughout the world. As they were not effective at breaching the newer fortifications resulting from the development of cannons, siege engines—such as siege towers and trebuchets—became less widely used. However, wooden "battery-towers" took on a similar role as siege towers in the gunpowder age—such as that used at siege of Kazan in 1552, which could hold ten large-caliber cannons, in addition to 50 lighter pieces. Another notable effect of cannons on warfare during this period was the change in conventional fortifications. Niccolò Machiavelli wrote, "There is no wall, whatever its thickness that artillery will not destroy in only a few days." Although castles were not immediately made obsolete by cannons, their use and importance on the battlefield rapidly declined. Instead of majestic towers and merlons, the walls of new fortresses were thicker, angulated, and sloped, while towers became lower and stouter; increasing use was also made of earthen, brick, and stone breastworks and redoubts. These new defenses became known as "star forts," after their characteristic shape. A few of these featured cannon batteries, such as the Tudors' Device Forts, in England. Star forts soon replaced castles in Europe, and, eventually, those in the Americas, as well.

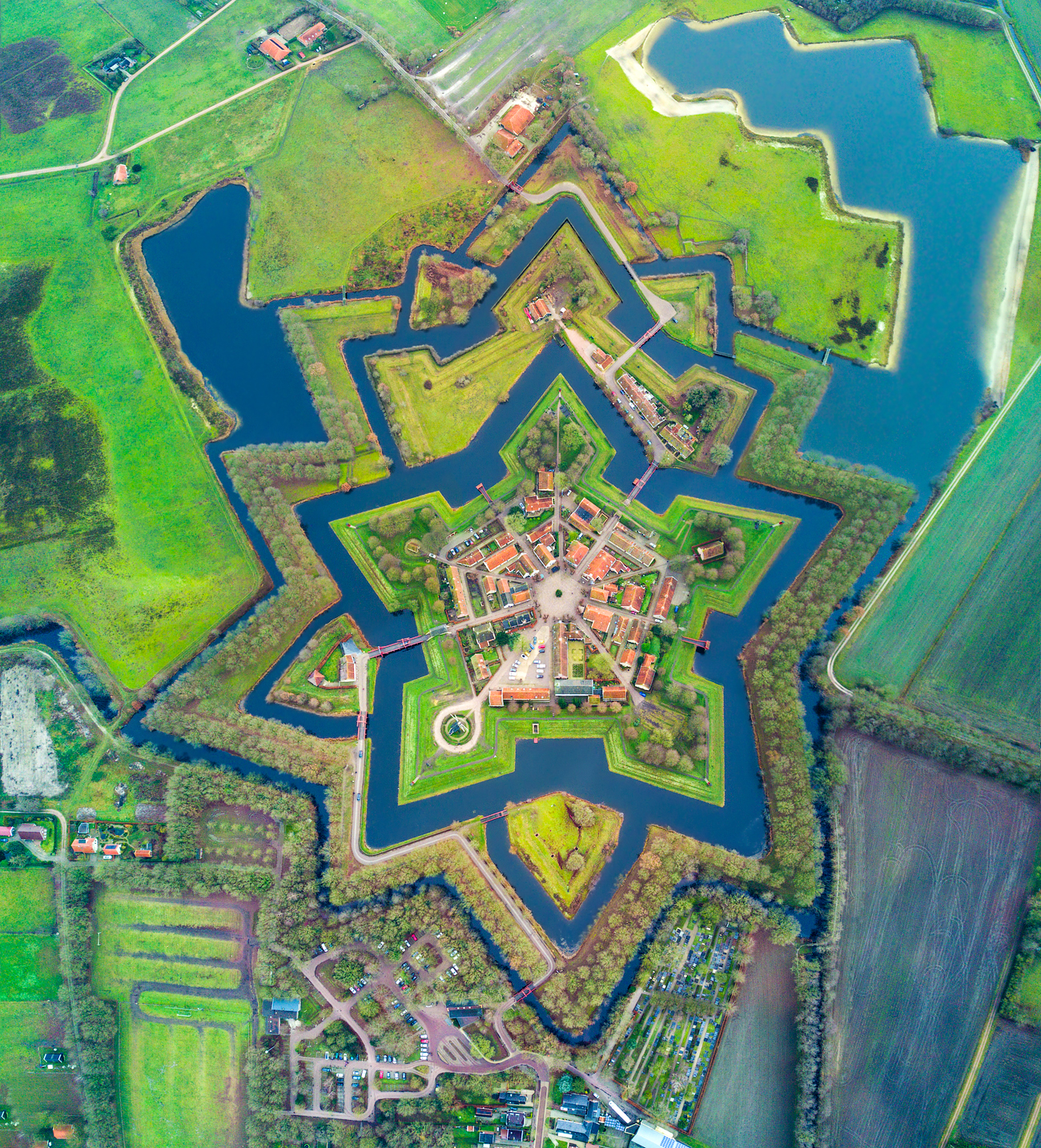
Fort Bourtange, a star fort, was built with angles and sloped walls specifically to defend against cannons.

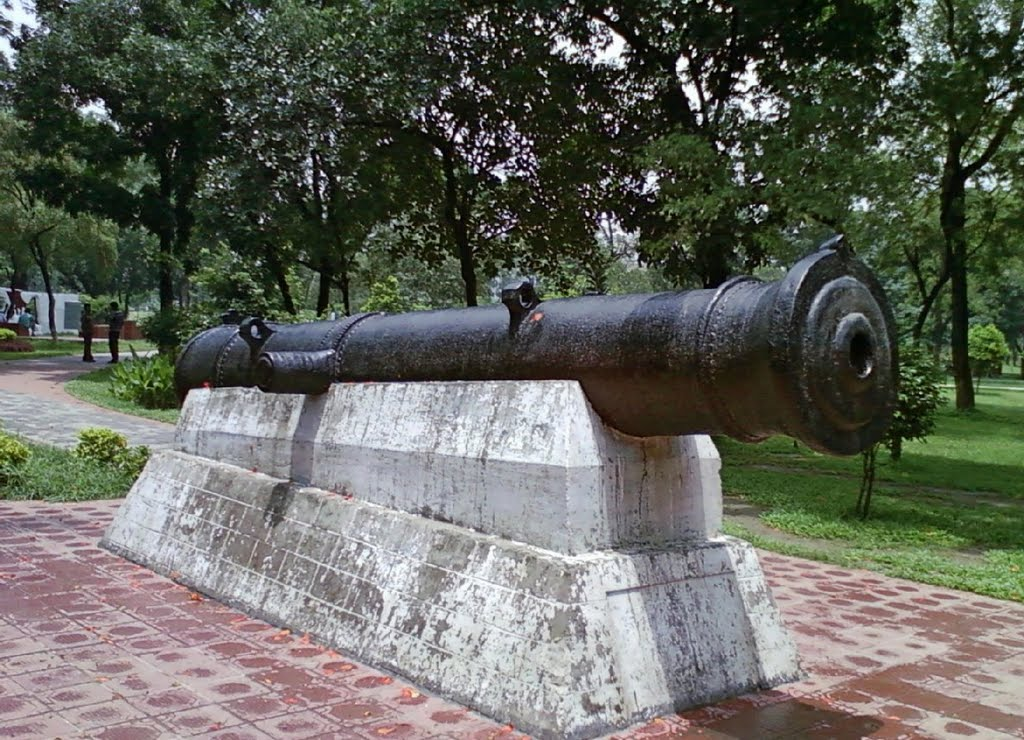
The large Bibi Mariam Cannon used in the Mughal Empire

By end of the 15th century, several technological advancements were made, making cannons more mobile. Wheeled gun carriages and trunnions became common, and the invention of the limber further facilitated the transportation of artillery. As a result, field artillery became viable, and began to emerge, often used alongside the larger cannons intended for sieges. The better gunpowder, improved, cast-iron projectiles, and the standardization of calibers meant that even relatively light cannons could be deadly. In The Art of War, Machiavelli observed that "It is true that the arquebuses and the small artillery do much more harm than the heavy artillery." This was the case at Flodden, in 1513: the English field guns outpaced the Scottish siege artillery, firing twice, or even thrice, as many rounds. Despite the increased maneuverability, however, cannons were still much slower than the rest of the army: a heavy English cannon required 23 horses to transport, while a culverin, nine, yet, even with this many animals transporting them, they still moved at a walking pace. Due to their relatively slow speed, and lack of organization, discipline, and tactics, the combination of pike and shot still dominated the battlefields of Europe.

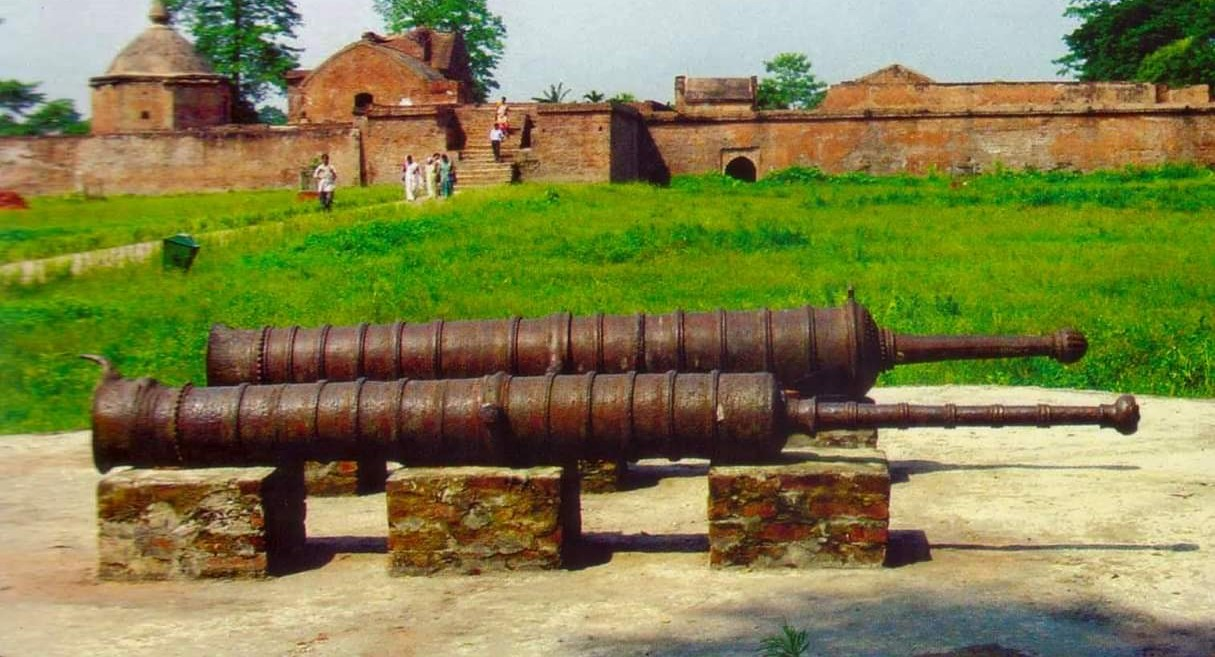
Ahom Cannons

Innovations continued, notably the German invention of the mortar, a thick-walled, short-barreled gun that blasted shot upward at a steep angle. Mortars were useful for sieges, as they could fire over walls and other defenses. This cannon found more use with the Dutch, who learned to shoot bombs filled with powder from them. However, setting the bomb fuse in the mortar was a problem. "Single firing" was the first technique used to set the fuse, where the bomb was placed with the fuse down against the propelling charge. This practice often resulted in the fuse being blown into the bomb, causing it to blow up in front of the mortar. Because of this danger, "double firing" was developed, where the fuse was turned up and the gunner lighted the fuse and the touch hole simultaneously. This, however, required much skill and timing, and was especially dangerous when the gun failed to fire, leaving a lighted bomb in the barrel. Not until 1650 was it accidentally discovered that double-lighting was a superfluous process: the heat of firing was enough to light the fuse.

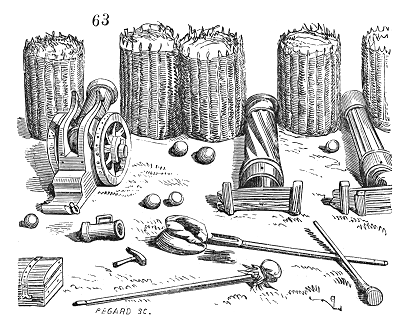
The use of gabions with cannon was an important part in the attack and defense of fortifications.

Gustavus Adolphus of Sweden emphasized the use of light cannons and mobility in his army, and created new formations and tactics that revolutionized artillery. He discontinued using all 12 pounder—or heavier—cannons as field artillery, preferring, instead, to use cannons that could be manned by only a few men. One gun, called the "leatheren," could be serviced by only two persons, but was abandoned, replaced by 4 pounder and 9 pounder demi-culverins. These could be operated by three men, and pulled by only two horses. Also, Adolphus's army was the first to use a special cartridge that contained both powder and shot, which sped up loading, and therefore increased the rate of fire. Additionally, he pioneered the use of canister shot against infantry, which was essentially a can, filled with musket balls. At the time, for each thousand infantrymen, there was one cannon on the battlefield; Gustavus Adolphus increased the number of cannons in his army so dramatically, that there were six cannons for each one thousand infantry. Each regiment was assigned two pieces, though he often decided to arrange his artillery into batteries, instead. These were to decimate the enemy's infantry, while his cavalry outflanked their heavy guns. At the Battle of Breitenfeld, in 1631, Adolphus proved the effectiveness of the changes made to his army, in particular his artillery, by defeating Johann Tserclaes, Count of Tilly. Although severely outnumbered, the Swedes were able to fire between three and five times as many volleys of artillery without losing ground, due to their infantry's linear formations. Battered by cannon fire, and low on morale, Tilly's men broke rank, and fled.

Around this time also came the idea of aiming the cannon to hit a target. Gunners controlled the range of their cannons by measuring the angle of elevation, using a "gunner's quadrant." Cannons did not have sights, therefore, even with measuring tools, aiming was still largely guesswork.

In the latter half of the 17th century, the French engineer Vauban introduced a more systematic and scientific approach to attacking gunpowder fortresses, in a time when many field commanders "were notorious dunces in siegecraft." Careful sapping forward, supported by enfilading ricochet fire, was a key feature of this system, and it even allowed Vauban to calculate the length of time a siege would take. He was also a prolific builder of star forts, and did much to popularize the idea of "depth defense" in the face of cannons. These principles were followed into the mid-19th century, when changes in armaments necessitated greater depth defense than Vauban had provided for. It was only in the years prior to World War I that new works began to break radically away from his designs.

== 18th and 19th centuries ==
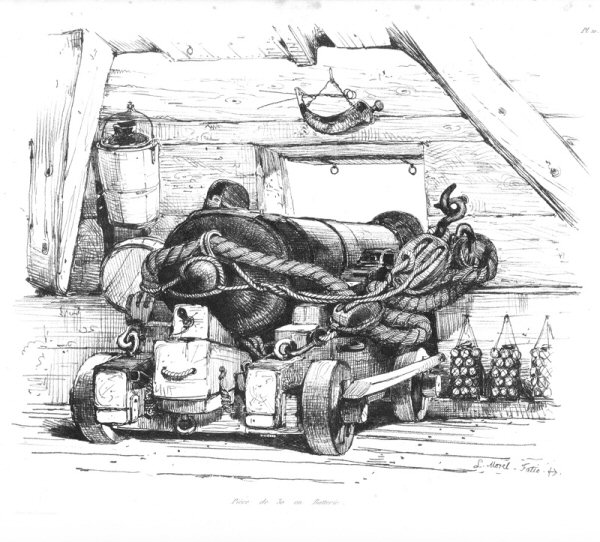
30 pounder long gun at the ready

The lower tier of 17th-century English ships of the line were usually equipped with demi-cannons, guns that fired a 32-pound (15 kg) solid shot, and could weigh up to 3,400 pounds (1,500 kg). Demi-cannons were capable of firing these heavy metal balls with such force, that they could penetrate more than a meter of solid oak, from a distance of 90 m (300 ft), and could dismast even the largest ships at close range. Full cannons fired a 42 lb (19 kg) shot, but were discontinued by the 18th century, as they were too unwieldy. By the end of the century, principles long adopted in Europe specified the characteristics of the Royal Navy's cannons, as well as the acceptable defects, and their severity. The United States Navy tested guns by measuring them, firing them two or three times,—termed "proof by powder"—and using pressurized water to detect leaks.

The carronade was adopted by the Royal Navy in 1779; the lower muzzle velocity of the round shot when fired from this cannon was intended to create more wooden splinters when hitting the structure of an enemy vessel, as they were believed to be deadly. The carronade was much shorter, and weighed between a third to a quarter less than an equivalent long gun; for example, a 32 pounder carronade weighed less than a ton, compared with a 32 pounder long gun, which weighed over 3 tons. The guns were, therefore, easier to handle, and also required less than half as much gunpowder, allowing fewer men to crew them. Carronades were manufactured in the usual naval gun calibers, but were not counted in a ship of the line's rated number of guns. As a result, the classification of Royal Navy vessels in this period can be misleading, as they often carried more cannons than were listed.

In the 1810s and 1820s, greater emphasis was placed on the accuracy of long-range gunfire, and less on the weight of a broadside. The carronade, although initially very successful and widely adopted, disappeared from the Royal Navy in the 1850s, after the development of jacketed steel cannon, by William George Armstrong and Joseph Whitworth. Nevertheless, carronades were used in the American Civil War.

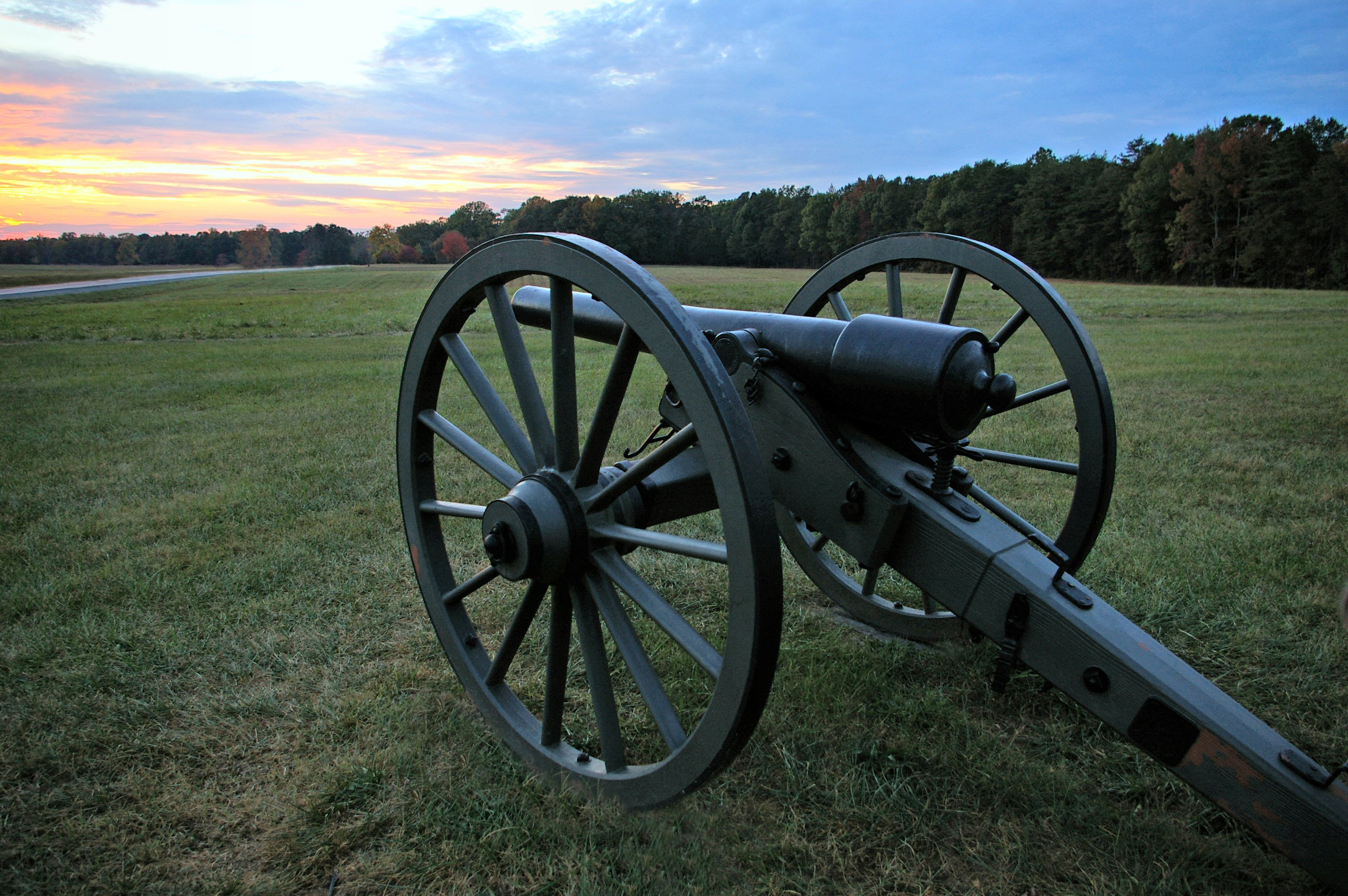
A cannon from the Battle of Chancellorsville

The Great Turkish Bombards of the Siege of Constantinople, after being on display for four centuries, were used to battle a British fleet in 1807, in the Dardanelles Operation. The artillery hit a British ship with two 700 lb (320 kg) cannonballs, killing 60 sailors; in total, the cannons claimed over 100 lives, prompting the British to retreat. In 1867, Sultan Abdul Aziz gave Queen Victoria the 17-ton "Dardanelles Gun," one of the cannon used at the siege of Constantinople.

In contrast to these antiquated weapons, Western cannons during the 19th century became larger, more destructive, more accurate, and could fire at longer range. One example is the American 3 in (76 mm) wrought-iron, muzzle-loading howitzer, used during the American Civil War, which had an effective range of over 1.1 mi (1.8 km). Another is the smoothbore 12 pounder Napoleon, which was renowned for its sturdiness, reliability, firepower, flexibility, relatively light weight, and range of 1,700 m (5,600 ft).

Cannons were crucial in Napoleon Bonaparte's rise to power, and continued to play an important role in his army in later years. During the French Revolution, the unpopularity of the Directory led to riots and rebellions. When over 25,000 of these royalists—led by General Danican—assaulted Paris, Paul François Jean Nicolas, vicomte de Barras was appointed to defend the capital; outnumbered five to one and disorganized, the Republicans were desperate. When Napoleon arrived, he reorganized the defenses, while realizing that without cannons, the city could not be held. He ordered Joachim Murat to bring the guns from the Sablons artillery park; the Major and his cavalry fought their way to the recently captured cannons, and brought them back to Napoleon. When Danican's poorly trained men attacked, on 5 October 1795, 13 Vendémiaire, 4 in the calendar used in France, at the time—Napoleon ordered his cannons to fire grapeshot into the mob, an act that became known as the "whiff of grapeshot". The slaughter effectively ended the threat to the new government, while, at the same time, made Bonaparte a famous—and popular—public figure. Among the first generals to recognize that artillery was not being used to its full potential, Napoleon often massed his cannons into batteries, and introduced several changes into the French artillery, improving it significantly, and making it among the finest in Europe. Such tactics were successfully used by the French, for example, at the Battle of Friedland, when sixty-six guns fired a total of 3,000 roundshot, and 500 grapeshot, inflicting severe casualties on the Russian forces, whose losses numbered over 20,000 killed and wounded, in total. At the Battle of Waterloo—Napoleon's final battle—the French army had many more artillery pieces than either the British or Prussians. As the battlefield was muddy, recoil caused cannons to bury themselves into the ground after firing, resulting in slow rates of fire, as more effort was required to move them back into an adequate firing position; also, roundshot did not ricochet with as much force from the wet earth. Despite the drawbacks, sustained artillery fire proved deadly during the engagement, especially during the French cavalry attack. The British infantry, having formed infantry squares, took heavy losses from the French guns, while their own cannons fired at the cuirassiers and lancers, when they fell back to regroup. Eventually, the French ceased their assault, after taking heavy losses from the British cannons and musket fire.

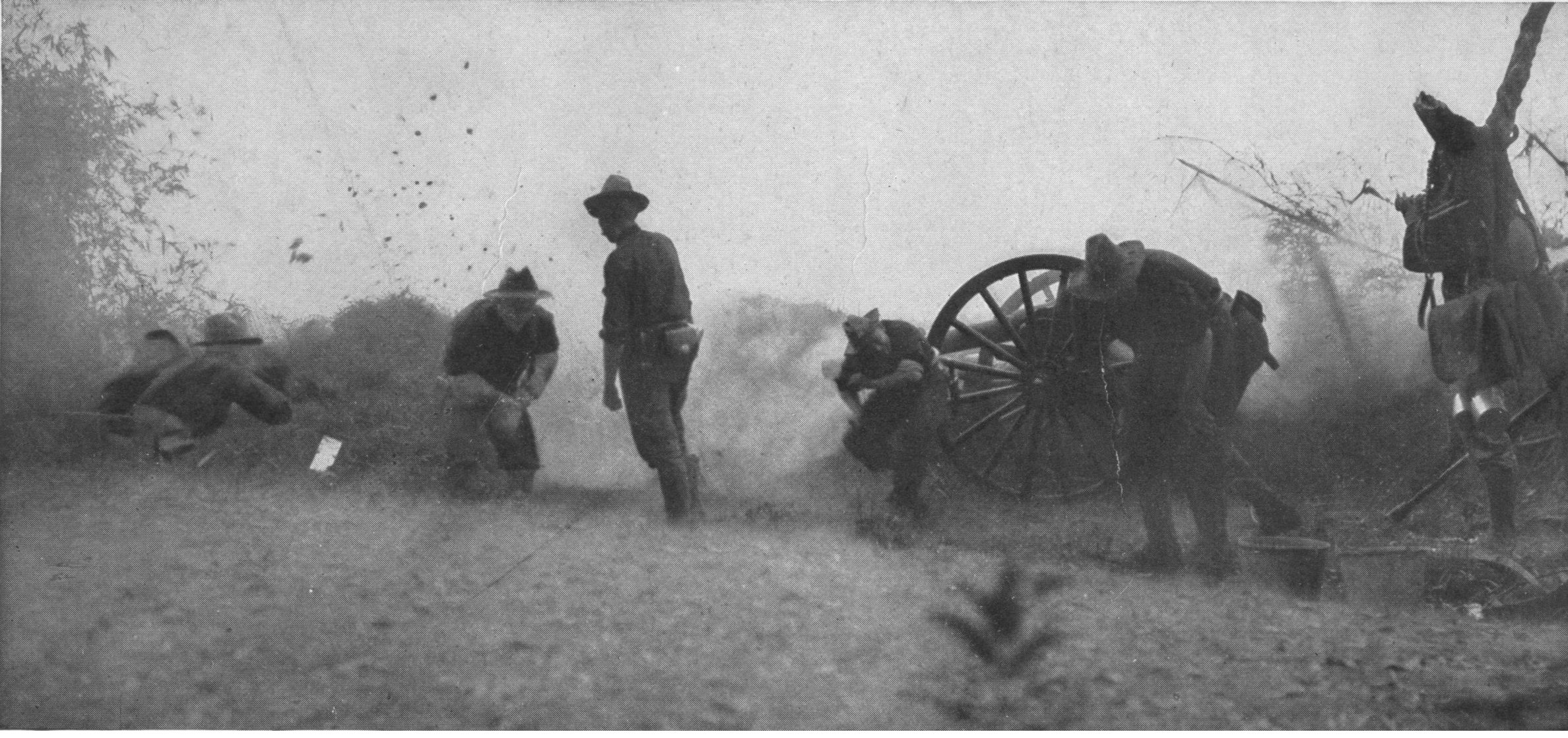
U.S. troops fire during the 1899 Battle of Manila, Philippine–American War

The practice of rifling—casting spiraling lines inside the cannon's barrel—was applied to artillery more frequently by 1855, as it gave cannons gyroscopic stability, which improved their accuracy. One of the earliest rifled cannons was the Armstrong gun—also invented by William George Armstrong—which boasted significantly improved range, accuracy, and power than earlier weapons. The projectile fired from the Armstrong gun could reportedly pierce through a ship's side, and explode inside the enemy vessel, causing increased damage, and casualties. The British military adopted the Armstrong gun, and was impressed; the Duke of Cambridge even declared that it "could do everything but speak." Despite being significantly more advanced than its predecessors, the Armstrong gun was rejected soon after its integration, in favor of the muzzle-loading pieces that had been in use before. While both types of gun were effective against wooden ships, neither had the capability to pierce the armor of ironclads; due to reports of slight problems with the breeches of the Armstrong gun, and their higher cost, the older muzzle-loaders were selected to remain in service, instead. Realizing that iron was more difficult to pierce with breech-loaded cannons, Armstrong designed rifled muzzle-loading guns, which proved successful; The Times reported: "even the fondest believers in the invulnerability of our present ironclads were obliged to confess that against such artillery, at such ranges, their plates and sides were almost as penetrable as wooden ships."

The superior cannons of the Western world brought them tremendous advantages in warfare. For example, in the Opium War in China, during the 19th century, British battleships bombarded the coastal areas and fortifications from afar, safe from the reach of the Chinese cannons. Similarly, the shortest war in recorded history, the Anglo-Zanzibar War of 1896, was brought to a swift conclusion by shelling from British battleships. The cynical attitude towards recruited infantry in the face of ever more powerful field artillery is the source of the term cannon fodder, first used by François-René de Chateaubriand, in 1814; however, the concept of regarding soldiers as nothing more than "food for powder" was mentioned by William Shakespeare as early as 1598, in Henry IV, Part 1.

== 20th and 21st centuries ==
Cannons in the 20th and 21st centuries are usually divided into sub-categories, and given separate names. Some of the most widely used types of modern cannons are howitzers, mortars, guns, and autocannon, although a few very large-calibre cannons, custom-designed, have also been constructed. Modern artillery is used in a variety of roles, depending on its type. According to NATO, the general role of artillery is to provide fire support, which is defined as "the application of fire, coordinated with the maneuver of forces to destroy, neutralize, or suppress the enemy."

When referring to cannons, the term gun is often used incorrectly. In military usage, a gun is a cannon with a high muzzle velocity and comparatively flat trajectory, as opposed to other types of artillery, such as howitzers or mortars, which have lower muzzle velocities, and usually fire indirectly.

=== Artillery ===
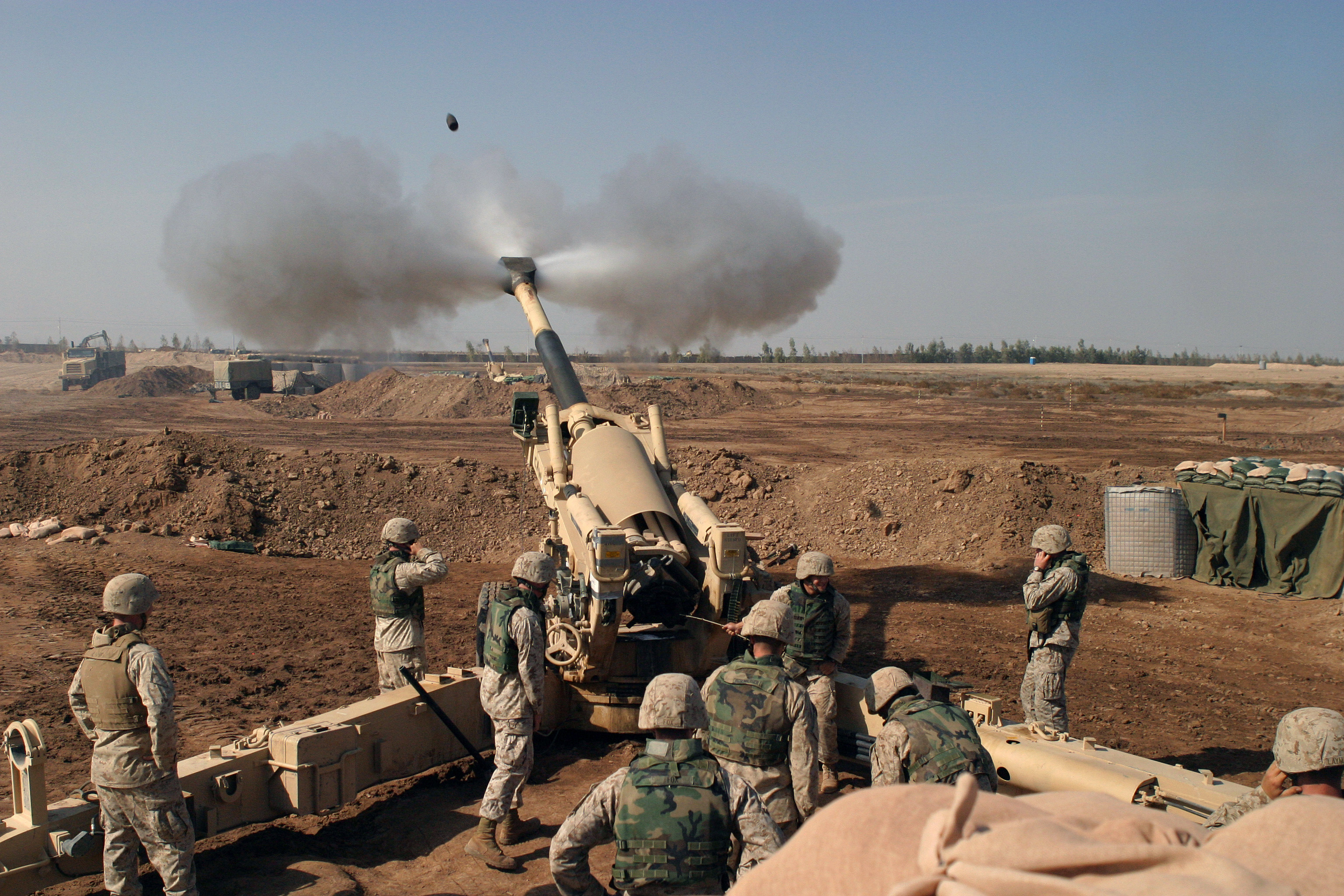
Nine-man crew firing a US M198 howitzer

By the early 20th century, infantry weapons became more powerful and accurate, forcing most artillery away from the front lines. Despite the change to indirect fire, cannons still proved highly effective during World War I, causing over 75% of casualties. The onset of trench warfare after the first few months of World War I greatly increased the demand for howitzers, as they fired at a steep angle, and were thus better suited than guns at hitting targets in trenches. Furthermore, their shells carried larger amounts of explosives than those of guns, and caused considerably less barrel wear. The German army took advantage of this, beginning the war with many more howitzers than the French. World War I also marked the use of the Paris Gun, the longest-ranged gun ever fired. This 200 mm (8 in) caliber gun was used by the Germans to bombard Paris, and was capable of hitting targets more than 122 km (76 mi) away.

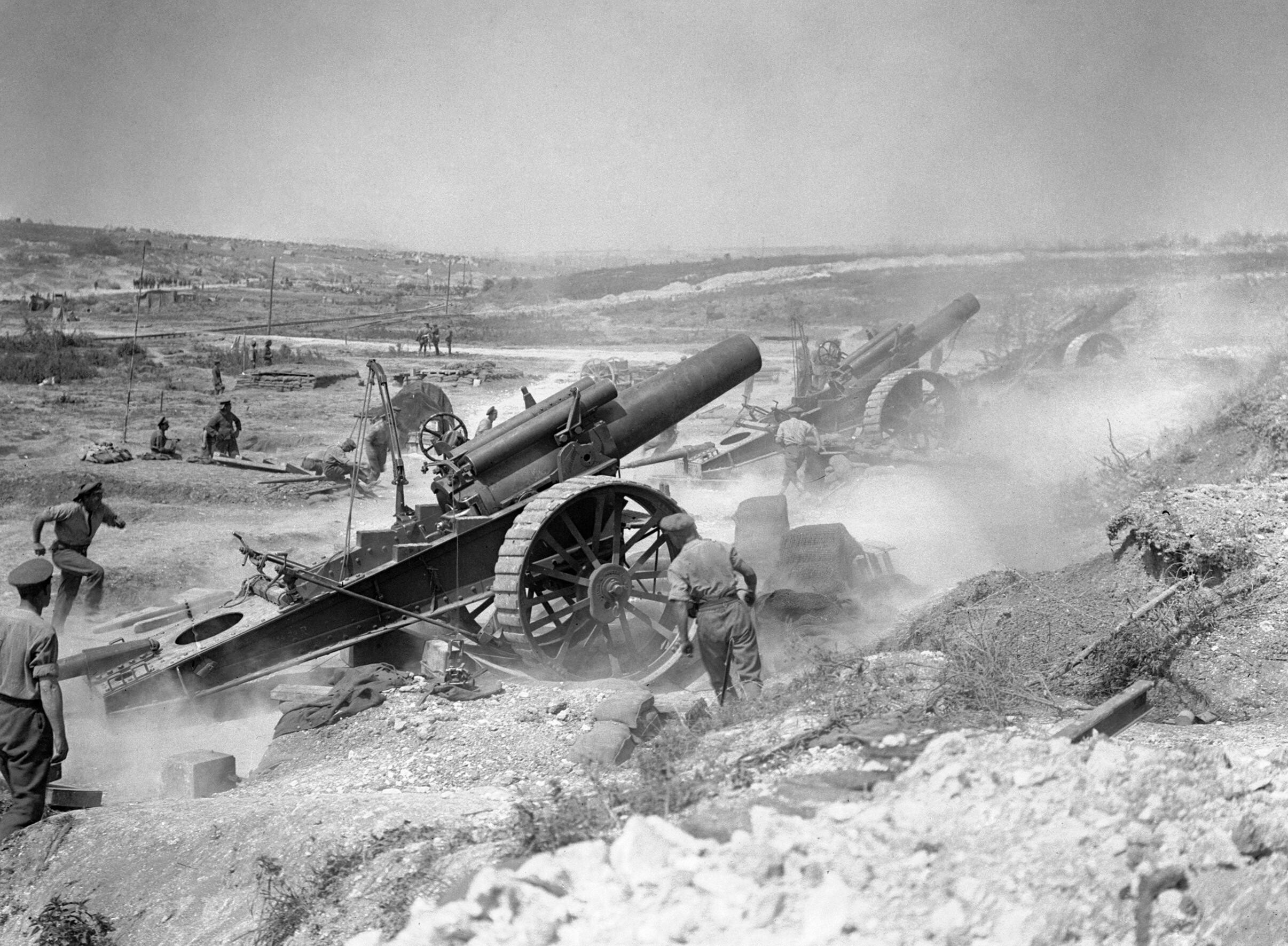
Royal Artillery howitzers at the Battle of the Somme

The Second World War sparked new developments in cannon technology. Among them were sabot rounds, hollow-charge projectiles, and proximity fuses, all of which were marginally significant. The World War II-era "legend" of the dreaded German 88 mm gun was launched during the Battle of Arras on 21 May 1940 when Generalmajor Erwin Rommel first ordered their use against Allied armor, devastating British Matilda II tanks, a well-armored design. The proximity fuse emerged on the battlefields of Europe in late December 1944. They became known as the American artillery's "Christmas present" for the German army, and were employed primarily in the Battle of the Bulge. Proximity fuses were effective against German personnel in the open, and hence were used to disperse their attacks. Also used to great effect in anti-aircraft projectiles, proximity fuses were used in both the European and Pacific Theaters of Operations, against V-1 flying bombs and kamikaze planes, respectively. Anti-tank guns were also tremendously improved during the war: in 1939, the British used primarily 2 pounder and 6 pounder guns. By the end of the war, 17 pounders had proven much more effective against German tanks, and 32 pounders had entered development. Meanwhile, German tanks were continuously upgraded with better main guns, in addition to other improvements. For example, the Panzer III was originally designed with a 37 mm gun, but was mass-produced with a 50 mm cannon. To counter the threat of the Russian T-34s, another, more powerful 50 mm gun was introduced, only to give way to a larger 75 mm cannon. Despite the improved guns, production of the Panzer III was ended in 1943, as the tank still could not match the T-34, and was, furthermore, being replaced by the Panzer IV and Panther tanks. Following the 88 mm FlaK 36's initial anti-tank success in 1940 and through the German forces' battles in North Africa and the Soviet Union, in 1944, its improved tank-mounted version, the 8.8 cm KwK 43,—and its multiple variations—entered service, used by the Wehrmacht, and was adapted to be both a tank's main gun, and the PaK 43 anti-tank gun. One of the most powerful guns to see service in World War II, it was capable of destroying any Allied tank at very long ranges.

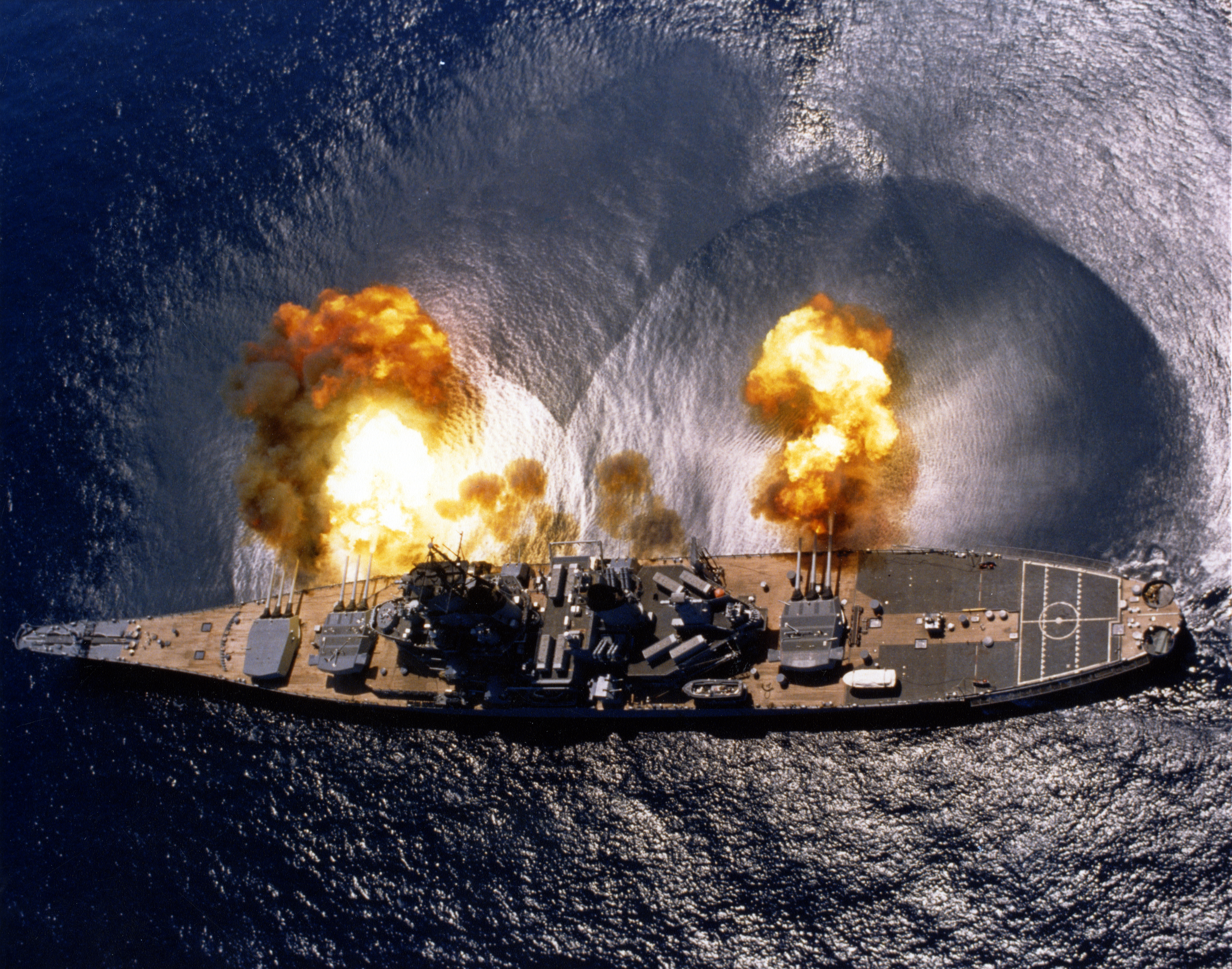
The USS Iowa firing her 16 in (41 cm) guns

Despite being designed to fire at trajectories with a steep angle of descent, howitzers can be fired directly, as was done by the 11th Marine Regiment at the Battle of Chosin Reservoir, during the Korean War. Two field batteries fired directly upon a battalion of Chinese infantry; the Marines were forced to brace themselves against their howitzers, as they had no time to dig them in. The Chinese infantry took heavy casualties, and were forced to retreat.

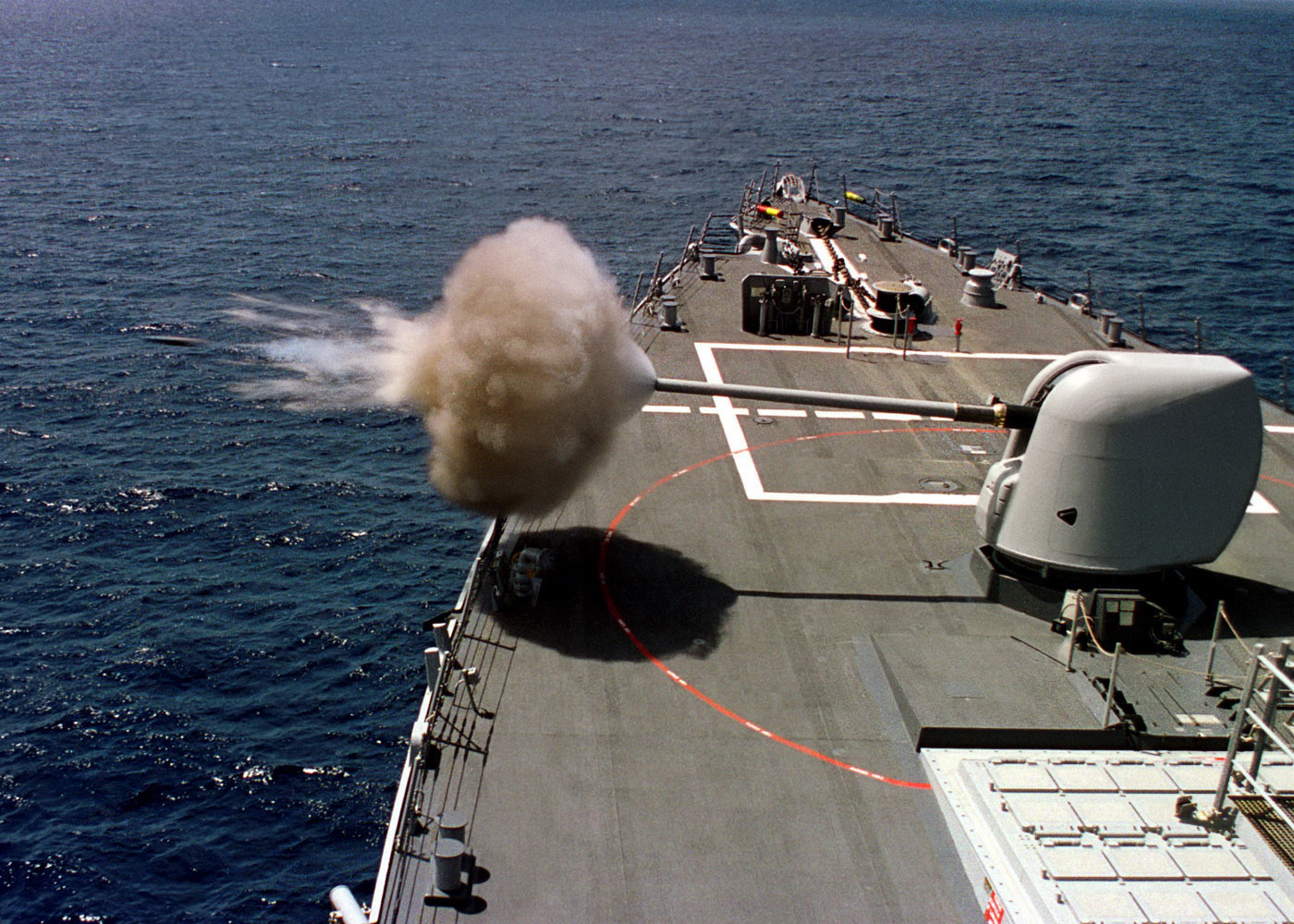
A 5 in (130 mm) Mark 45 gun being fired from a Ticonderoga-class cruiser

The tendency to create larger caliber cannons during the World Wars has been reversed in more recent years. The United States Army, for example, sought a lighter, more versatile howitzer, to replace their aging pieces. As it could be towed, the M198 was selected to be the successor to the World War II-era cannon used at the time, and entered service in 1979. Still in use today, the M198 is, in turn, being slowly replaced by the M777 Ultralightweight howitzer, which weighs nearly half as much, and can be transported by helicopter—as opposed to the M198, which requires a C-5 or C-17 to airlift. Although land-based artillery such as the M198 are powerful, long-ranged, and accurate, naval guns have not been neglected, despite being much smaller than in the past, and, in some cases, having been replaced by cruise missiles. However, the Zumwalt-class destroyer's planned armament includes the Advanced Gun System (AGS), a pair of 155 mm guns, which fire the Long Range Land-Attack Projectile. The warhead, which weighs 24 pounds (11 kg), has a circular error of probability of 50 m (160 ft), and will be mounted on a rocket, to increase the effective range to 100 nmi (190 km)—a longer range than that of the Paris Gun. The AGS's barrels will be water cooled, and will be capable of firing 10 rounds per minute, per gun. The combined firepower from both turrets will give Zumwalt-class destroyers the firepower equivalent to 18 conventional M-198 howitzers. The reason for the re-integration of cannons as a main armament in United States Navy ships is because satellite-guided munitions fired from a gun are far less expensive than a cruise missile, and are therefore a better alternative to many combat situations.

=== Autocannon ===
An autocannon is a cannon with a larger caliber than a machine gun, but smaller than that of a field gun. Autocannons have mechanisms to automatically load their ammunition, and therefore have a faster rate of fire than artillery, often approaching—and, in the case of Gatling guns, surpassing—that of a machine gun. The traditional minimum bore for autocannons—indeed, for all types of cannons, as autocannons are the lowest-caliber pieces—has remained 20 mm, since World War II.

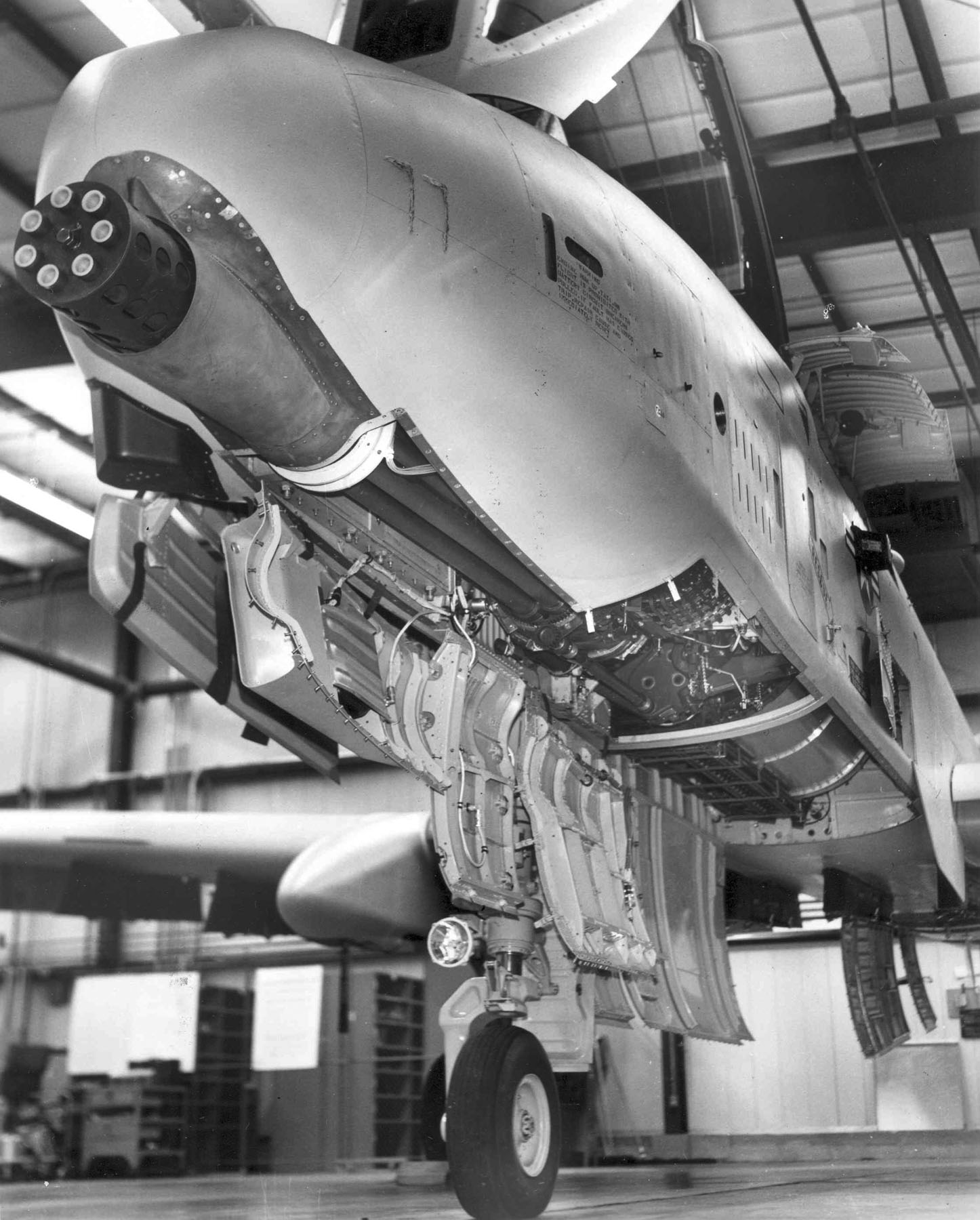
The GAU-8/A Avenger autocannon, mounted in an A-10 Thunderbolt II

Most nations use these rapid-fire cannons on their light vehicles, replacing a more powerful, but heavier, tank gun. A typical autocannon is the 25 mm "Bushmaster" chain gun, mounted on the LAV-25 and M2 Bradley armored vehicles.

Autocannons have largely replaced machine guns in aircraft, due to their greater firepower. The first airborne cannon appeared in World War II, but each airplane could carry only one or two, as cannons are heavier than machine guns, the standard armament. They were variously mounted, often in the wings, but also high on the forward fuselage, where they would fire through the propeller, or even through the propeller hub. Due both to the low number of cannons per aircraft, and the lower rate of fire of cannons, machine guns continued to be used widely early in the war, as there was a greater probability of hitting enemy aircraft. However, as cannons were more effective against more heavily armored bomber aircraft, they were eventually integrated into newer fighters, which usually carried between two and four autocannons. The Hispano-Suiza HS.404, Oerlikon 20 mm cannon, MG FF, and their numerous variants became among the most widely used autocannons in the war. Nearly all modern fighter aircraft are armed with an autocannon, and most are derived from their counterparts from the Second World War. The largest, heaviest, and most powerful airborne cannon used by the military of the United States is the GAU-8/A Avenger Gatling-type rotary cannon; it is surpassed only by the specialized artillery pieces carried on the AC-130 gunship.

Although capable of generating a high volume of fire, autocannons are limited by the amount of ammunition that can be carried by the weapons systems mounting them. For this reason, both the 25 mm Bushmaster and the 30 mm RARDEN are deliberately designed with relatively slow rates of fire, to extend the amount of time they can be employed on a battlefield before requiring a resupply of ammunition. The rate of fire of modern autocannons ranges from 90 rounds per minute, to 1,800 rounds per minute. Systems with multiple barrels—Gatling guns—can have rates of fire of several thousand rounds per minute; the fastest of these is the GSh-6-30K, which has a rate of fire of over 6,000 rounds per minute.

== Bibliography ==
- Adle, Chahryar (2003), History of Civilizations of Central Asia: Development in Contrast: from the Sixteenth to the Mid-Nineteenth Century
- Ágoston, Gábor (2005), Guns for the Sultan: Military Power and the Weapons Industry in the Ottoman Empire, Cambridge University Press, ISBN 978-0-521-60391-1
- Agrawal, Jai Prakash (2010), High Energy Materials: Propellants, Explosives and Pyrotechnics, Wiley-VCH
- Andrade, Tonio (2016), The Gunpowder Age: China, Military Innovation, and the Rise of the West in World History, Princeton University Press, ISBN 978-0-691-13597-7.
- Archer, Christon I. (2002), World History of Warfare, University of Nebraska Press, ISBN 978-0-8032-4423-8
- Arnold, Thomas (2001), The Renaissance at War, Cassell & Co, ISBN 978-0-304-35270-8
- Asprey, Robert B. (2000), The Rise of Napoleon Bonaparte, Basic Books, ISBN 978-0-465-04881-6
- Bastable, Marshall J. (2004), Arms and the State: Sir William Armstrong and the Remaking of British Naval Power, 1854–1914, Ashgate Publishing, Ltd., ISBN 978-0-7546-3404-1
- Baynes, Thomas S. (1888), The Encyclopædia Britannica A Dictionary of Arts, Sciences, Literature and General Information, volume 2
- Benton, Captain James G. (1862), A Course of Instruction in Ordnance and Gunnery (2 ed.), West Point, New York: Thomas Publications, ISBN 978-1-57747-079-3
- Bradbury, Jim (1992), The Medieval Siege, Rochester, New York: Boydell & Brewer, ISBN 978-0-85115-312-4
- Bradford, George (2007), German Early War Armored Fighting Vehicles, Mechanicsburg, Pennsylvania: Stackpole Books, ISBN 978-0-8117-3341-0
- Braun, Wernher Von; Frederick Ira Ordway (1967), History of Rocketry & Space Travel, Thomas Y. Crowell Co., ISBN 978-0-690-00588-2
- Brown, G. I. (1998), The Big Bang: A History of Explosives, Sutton Publishing, ISBN 978-0-7509-1878-7.
- Buchanan, Brenda J., ed. (2006), "Gunpowder, Explosives and the State: A Technological History", Technology and Culture, vol. 49, Aldershot: Ashgate, pp. 785–786, doi:10.1353/tech.0.0051, ISBN 978-0-7546-5259-5, S2CID 111173101
- Chandler, David G. (1995), The Campaigns of Napoleon, New York City: Simon & Schuster, ISBN 978-0-02-523660-8
- Chase, Kenneth (2003), Firearms: A Global History to 1700, Cambridge University Press, ISBN 978-0-521-82274-9.
- Chartrand, René (29 August 2006), Spanish Main 1492–1800, Random House, ISBN 978-1-84603-005-5
- Cocroft, Wayne (2000), Dangerous Energy: The archaeology of gunpowder and military explosives manufacture, Swindon: English Heritage, ISBN 978-1-85074-718-5
- Conner, Susan P. (2004), The Age of Napoleon, Greenwood Publishing Group, ISBN 978-0-313-32014-9
- Cook, Haruko Taya (2000), Japan at War: An Oral History, Phoenix Press
- Cowley, Robert (1993), Experience of War, Laurel.
- Craik, George L.; Charles MacFarlane (1884), The Pictorial History of England during the Reign of George the Third: Being a History of the People, as well as a History of the Kingdom, volume 2, London: Charles Knight
- Cressy, David (2013), Saltpeter: The Mother of Gunpowder, Oxford University Press
- Crosby, Alfred W. (2002), Throwing Fire: Projectile Technology Through History, Cambridge University Press, ISBN 978-0-521-79158-8.
- Curtis, W. S. (2014), Long Range Shooting: A Historical Perspective, WeldenOwen.
- Dickens, Charles (22 April 1859). All the Year Round: A Weekly Journal.
- Earl, Brian (1978), Cornish Explosives, Cornwall: The Trevithick Society, ISBN 978-0-904040-13-5.
- Easton, S. C. (1952), Roger Bacon and His Search for a Universal Science: A Reconsideration of the Life and Work of Roger Bacon in the Light of His Own Stated Purposes, Basil Blackwell
- Ebrey, Patricia B. (1999), The Cambridge Illustrated History of China, Cambridge University Press, ISBN 978-0-521-43519-2
- Gat, Azar (2006), War in Human Civilization, New York City: Oxford University Press, ISBN 978-0-19-926213-7
- Grant, R.G. (2011), Battle at Sea: 3,000 Years of Naval Warfare, DK Publishing.
- Green, Michael; Thomas Anderson; Frank Schulz (2000), German Tanks of World War II in Color, Zenith Imprint, ISBN 978-0-7603-0671-0
- Griffith, Paddy (2006), The Vauban Fortifications of France, Osprey Publishing, ISBN 978-1-84176-875-5
- Gudmundsson, Bruce I. (1993), On Artillery, Greenwood Publishing Group, ISBN 978-0-275-94047-8
- Hadden, R. Lee. 2005. "Confederate Boys and Peter Monkeys." Armchair General. January 2005. Adapted from a talk given to the Geological Society of America on 25 March 2004.
- Halberstadt, Hans (2002), The World's Great Artillery: From the Middle Ages to the Present Day, Barnes & Noble, ISBN 978-0-7607-3303-5
- Harding, David (1990), Weapons: An International Encyclopedia from 5000 B.C. to 2000 A.D., Diane Publishing Company, ISBN 978-0-7567-8436-2
- Harding, Richard (1999), Seapower and Naval Warfare, 1650-1830, UCL Press Limited
- al-Hassan, Ahmad Y. (2001), "Potassium Nitrate in Arabic and Latin Sources", History of Science and Technology in Islam.
- Hazlett, James C.; Edwin Olmstead; M. Hume Parks (2004), Field Artillery Weapons of the American Civil War (5th ed.), Champaign, Illinois: University of Illinois Press, ISBN 978-0-252-07210-9
- Heath, Byron (2005), Discovering the Great South Land, Kenthurst, New South Wales: Rosenberg Publishing, ISBN 978-1-877058-31-8
- Hoffmeyer, Ada Bruhn de. (1972), Arms and Armour in Spain: A Short Survey, Madrid: Instituto de Estudios sobre Armas Antiguas
- Hogg, Ian V.; John H. Batchelor (1978), Naval Gun, Blandford Press, ISBN 978-0-7137-0905-6
- Holmes, Richard (2002), Redcoat: the British Soldier in the age of Horse and Musket, W. W. Norton & Company, ISBN 978-0-393-05211-4
- Jarymowycz, Roman Johann (2001), Tank Tactics: From Normandy to Lorraine, Lynne Rienner Publishers, ISBN 978-1-55587-950-1
- Hobson, John M. (2004), The Eastern Origins of Western Civilisation, Cambridge University Press.
- Johnson, Norman Gardner. "explosive". Encyclopædia Britannica. Encyclopædia Britannica Online. Chicago.
- Keegan, John (2000), World War II: A Visual Encyclopedia, Sterling Publishing Company, Inc., ISBN 978-1-85585-878-7
- Kelly, Jack (2004), Gunpowder: Alchemy, Bombards, & Pyrotechnics: The History of the Explosive that Changed the World, Basic Books, ISBN 978-0-465-03718-6.
- Khan, Iqtidar Alam (1996), "Coming of Gunpowder to the Islamic World and North India: Spotlight on the Role of the Mongols", Journal of Asian History, 30: 41–5.
- Khan, Iqtidar Alam (2004), Gunpowder and Firearms: Warfare in Medieval India, Oxford University Press
- Khan, Iqtidar Alam (2008), Historical Dictionary of Medieval India, The Scarecrow Press, Inc., ISBN 978-0-8108-5503-8
- Kinard, Jeff (2007), Artillery An Illustrated History of its Impact
- Knox, Dudley W. (1939), Naval Documents related to the United States Wars with the Barbary Powers, Volume I, Washington: United States Government Printing Office
- Konstam, Angus (2002), Renaissance War Galley 1470-1590, Osprey Publisher Ltd..
- Krebs, Robert E. (2004), Groundbreaking Scientific Experiments, Inventions, and Discoveries of the Middle Ages and the Renaissance, Greenwood Publishing Group, ISBN 978-0-313-32433-8
- Lee, Ernest Markham (1906), Tchaikovsky, Harvard University: G. Bell & sons
- Liang, Jieming (2006), Chinese Siege Warfare: Mechanical Artillery & Siege Weapons of Antiquity, Singapore, Republic of Singapore: Leong Kit Meng, ISBN 978-981-05-5380-7
- Lidin, Olaf G. (2002), Tanegashima – The Arrival of Europe in Japan, Nordic Inst of Asian Studies, ISBN 978-8791114120
- Lorge, Peter A. (2008), The Asian Military Revolution: from Gunpowder to the Bomb, Cambridge University Press, ISBN 978-0-521-60954-8
- Lu, Gwei-Djen (1988), "The Oldest Representation of a Bombard", Technology and Culture, 29 (3): 594–605, doi:10.2307/3105275, JSTOR 3105275, S2CID 112733319
- Manigault, Edward; Warren Ripley (1996), Siege Train: The Journal of a Confederate Artilleryman in the Defense of Charleston, Charleston, South Carolina: University of South Carolina Press, ISBN 978-1-57003-127-4
- Manucy, Albert (1994), Artillery Through the Ages: A Short Illustrated History of Cannon, Emphasising Types Used in America, Diane Publishing, ISBN 978-0-7881-0745-0, archived from the original on 2 July 2007
- May, Timothy (2012), The Mongol Conquests in World History, Reaktion Books
- McCamley, Nicholas J. (2004), Disasters Underground, Pen & Sword Military, ISBN 978-1-84415-022-9
- McCarthy, Peter; Mike Syron (2003), Panzerkrieg: The Rise and Fall of Hitler's Tank Divisions, Carroll & Graf Publishers, ISBN 978-0-7867-1264-9
- McLahlan, Sean (2010), Medieval Handgonnes
- McNeill, William Hardy (1992), The Rise of the West: A History of the Human Community, University of Chicago Press.
- Morillo, Stephen (2008), War in World History: Society, Technology, and War from Ancient Times to the Present, Volume 1, To 1500, McGraw-Hill, ISBN 978-0-07-052584-9
- Needham, Joseph (1971), Science and Civilization in China Volume 4 Part 3, Cambridge at the University Press
- Needham, Joseph (1980), Science & Civilisation in China, vol. 5 pt. 4, Cambridge University Press, ISBN 978-0-521-08573-1
- Needham, Joseph (1986), Science & Civilisation in China, vol. V:7: The Gunpowder Epic, Cambridge University Press, ISBN 978-0-521-30358-3.
- Nicolle, David (28 July 1983). Armies of the Ottoman Turks 1300–1774. Bloomsbury USA. ISBN 978-0-85045-511-3.
- Nicolle, David (1990), The Mongol Warlords: Genghis Khan, Kublai Khan, Hulegu, Tamerlane
- Nicolle, David (2000), Crécy 1346: Triumph of the Longbow, Osprey Publishing, ISBN 978-1-85532-966-9
- Nolan, Cathal J. (2006), The Age of Wars of Religion, 1000–1650: an Encyclopedia of Global Warfare and Civilization, Vol 1, A-K, vol. 1, Westport & London: Greenwood Press, ISBN 978-0-313-33733-8
- Norris, John (2003), Early Gunpowder Artillery: 1300–1600, Marlborough: The Crowood Press.
- Nossov, Konstantin (2007), Medieval Russian Fortresses AD 862–1480, Osprey Publishing, ISBN 978-1-84603-093-2
- Nossov, Konstantin (2006), Russian Fortresses, 1480–1682, Osprey Publishing, ISBN 978-1-84176-916-5
- Pacey, Arnold (1990), Technology in World Civilization: A Thousand-Year History, MIT Press, ISBN 978-0-262-66072-3
- Partington, J. R. (1960), A History of Greek Fire and Gunpowder, Cambridge, UK: W. Heffer & Sons.
- Partington, J. R. (1999), A History of Greek Fire and Gunpowder, Baltimore: Johns Hopkins University Press, ISBN 978-0-8018-5954-0
- Patrick, John Merton (1961), Artillery and warfare during the thirteenth and fourteenth centuries, Utah State University Press.
- Pauly, Roger (2004), Firearms: The Life Story of a Technology, Greenwood Publishing Group.
- Perrin, Noel (1979), Giving up the Gun, Japan's reversion to the Sword, 1543–1879, Boston: David R. Godine, ISBN 978-0-87923-773-8
- Petzal, David E. (2014), The Total Gun Manual (Canadian edition), WeldonOwen.
- Phillips, Henry Prataps (2016), The History and Chronology of Gunpowder and Gunpowder Weapons (c.1000 to 1850), Notion Press
- Playfair, Ian S. O.; T. P. Gleave (1987), The Mediterranean and Middle East, HMSO, ISBN 978-0-11-630946-4
- Purton, Peter (2010), A History of the Late Medieval Siege, 1200–1500, Boydell Press, ISBN 978-1-84383-449-6
- Reymond, Arnold (1963), History of the Sciences in Greco-Roman Antiquity, Biblo & Tannen Publishers, ISBN 978-0-8196-0128-5
- Robins, Benjamin (1742), New Principles of Gunnery
- Rogers, Clifford J. (2018). "The Military Revolutions of the Hundred Years War". In Clifford J. Rogers (ed.). The Military Revolution Debate. Readings On The Military Transformation Of Early Modern Europe. pp. 55–94.
- Rose, Susan (2002), Medieval Naval Warfare 1000-1500, Routledge
- Roy, Kaushik (2015), Warfare in Pre-British India, Routledge
- Runciman, Steven (1965). The fall of Constantinople, 1453. Cambridge: Cambridge University Press. ISBN 978-0-521-39832-9.
- Russ, Martin (1999), Breakout: The Chosin Reservoir Campaign, Korea 1950, Penguin Books, ISBN 978-0-14-029259-6
- Sadler, John (2006), Flodden 1513: Scotland's Greatest Defeat, Osprey Publishing, ISBN 978-1-84176-959-2
- Schmidtchen, Volker (1977a), "Riesengeschütze des 15. Jahrhunderts. Technische Höchstleistungen ihrer Zeit", Technikgeschichte 44 (2): 153–173 (153–157)
- Schmidtchen, Volker (1977b), "Riesengeschütze des 15. Jahrhunderts. Technische Höchstleistungen ihrer Zeit", Technikgeschichte 44 (3): 213–237 (226–228)
- Stone, George Cameron (1999), A Glossary of the Construction, Decoration, and Use of Arms and Armor in All Countries and in All Times, Courier Dover Publications, ISBN 978-0-486-40726-5
- Tran, Nhung Tuyet (2006), Viêt Nam Borderless Histories, University of Wisconsin Press.
- Tunis, Edwin (1999), Weapons: A Pictorial History, Baltimore, Maryland: Johns Hopkins University Press, ISBN 978-0-8018-6229-8
- Turnbull, Stephen (2003), Fighting Ships Far East (2: Japan and Korea Ad 612-1639, Osprey Publishing, ISBN 978-1-84176-478-8
- Turnbull, Stephen (2004), The Walls of Constantinople AD 413–1453, Osprey Publishing, ISBN 978-1-84176-759-8
- Turnbull, Stephen (22 July 2008). The Samurai Invasion of Korea 1592–98. Bloomsbury USA. ISBN 978-1-84603-254-7.
- Urbanski, Tadeusz (1967), Chemistry and Technology of Explosives, vol. III, New York: Pergamon Press.
- Villalon, L. J. Andrew (2008), The Hundred Years War (part II): Different Vistas, Brill Academic Pub, ISBN 978-90-04-16821-3
- Wagner, John A. (2006), The Encyclopedia of the Hundred Years War, Westport & London: Greenwood Press, ISBN 978-0-313-32736-0
- Wallechinsky, David; Irving Wallace (1975), The People's Almanac, Doubleday, ISBN 978-0-385-04186-7
- Watson, Peter (2006), Ideas: A History of Thought and Invention, from Fire to Freud, Harper Perennial (2006), ISBN 978-0-06-093564-1
- Wilkinson, Philip (9 September 1997), Castles, Dorling Kindersley, ISBN 978-0-7894-2047-3
- Wilkinson-Latham, Robert (1975), Napoleon's Artillery, France: Osprey Publishing, ISBN 978-0-85045-247-1
- Willbanks, James H. (2004), Machine guns: an illustrated history of their impact, ABC-CLIO, Inc.
- Williams, Anthony G. (2000), Rapid Fire, Shrewsbury: Airlife Publishing Ltd., ISBN 978-1-84037-435-3
- Young, Mark C (2002), Guinness Book of World Records (2002 ed.), England: Bantam Books, ISBN 978-0-553-58378-6
- Zetterling, Niklas; Anders Frankson (2000), Kursk 1943: A Statistical Analysis, Routledge, ISBN 978-0-7146-5052-4
