= Basilic =

Basilic can refer to:

- Basilic (cannon)
- Basilic vein
- French for basilisk and for the plant basil

== See also ==
- Basil (name), of which Basilic is a variant
