= Orbán (ironmaster) =

Iron founder and engineer (died 1453)

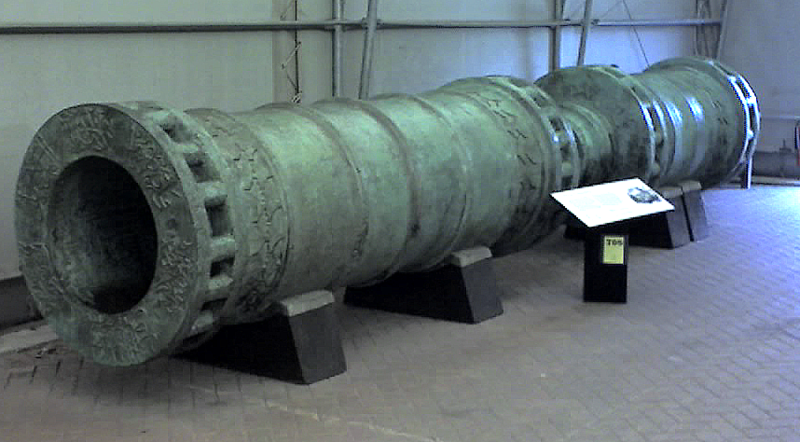
The Dardanelles Gun, cast in 1464 and based on the Orban bombard Basilic that was used for the Ottoman besiegers of Constantinople in 1453; British Royal Armouries collection.

Orbán (died 1453), also known as Urban, was an iron founder and engineer from Brassó, Transylvania, in the Kingdom of Hungary (today Brașov, Romania), who cast large-calibre artillery, Basilic, for the siege of Constantinople by the Ottomans in 1453.

Orban was Hungarian, according to most modern authors, while some scholars also mention his potential German ancestry. Alternative theories suggest he had Wallachian roots. Laonikos Chalkokondyles used the term Dacian to describe him.

He had offered his services to the Byzantines in 1452, a year before the Ottomans attacked the city, but the Byzantine emperor Constantine XI could not afford Orban's high salary nor did the Byzantines possess the materials necessary for constructing such a large siege cannon. Orban then left Constantinople and approached the Ottoman sultan Mehmed II, who was preparing to besiege the city. Claiming that his weapon could blast 'the walls of Babylon itself', Orban was given abundant funds and materials by the sultan. Orban managed to build the giant gun within three months at Adrianople, whence sixty oxen dragged it to Constantinople. Orban also produced other, smaller cannons used by the Turkish siege forces.

Bombarding technology similar to Orban's had first been developed for the Hungarian Army. It rose in popularity during the early 1400s all over western Europe, transforming siege warfare. Examples of pieces similar to Orban's productions like the Faule Mette, Dulle Griet, Mons Meg and the Pumhart von Steyr are still extant from the period.

Orban is said to have died in an explosion during the siege of Constantinople in 1453, when one of his great cannons exploded due to overuse.

== Sources ==
- Nicolle, David (2000), Constantinople 1453: The End of Byzantium, Osprey Publishing, ISBN 1-84176-091-9
- Philippides, Marios; Hanak, Walter K. (2 May 2017), The Siege and the Fall of Constantinople in 1453: Historiography, Topography, and Military Studies, Routledge, ISBN 978-1-317-01608-3
- Runciman, Steven (1990), The Fall of Constantinople: 1453, London: Cambridge University Press, pp. 77–78, ISBN 978-0-521-39832-9
- Schmidtchen, Volker (1977a), "Riesengeschütze des 15. Jahrhunderts. Technische Höchstleistungen ihrer Zeit", Technikgeschichte, 44 (2): 153–173
- Schmidtchen, Volker (1977b), "Riesengeschütze des 15. Jahrhunderts. Technische Höchstleistungen ihrer Zeit", Technikgeschichte, 44 (3): 213–237
