= Dardanelles Gun =

15th-century siege cannon

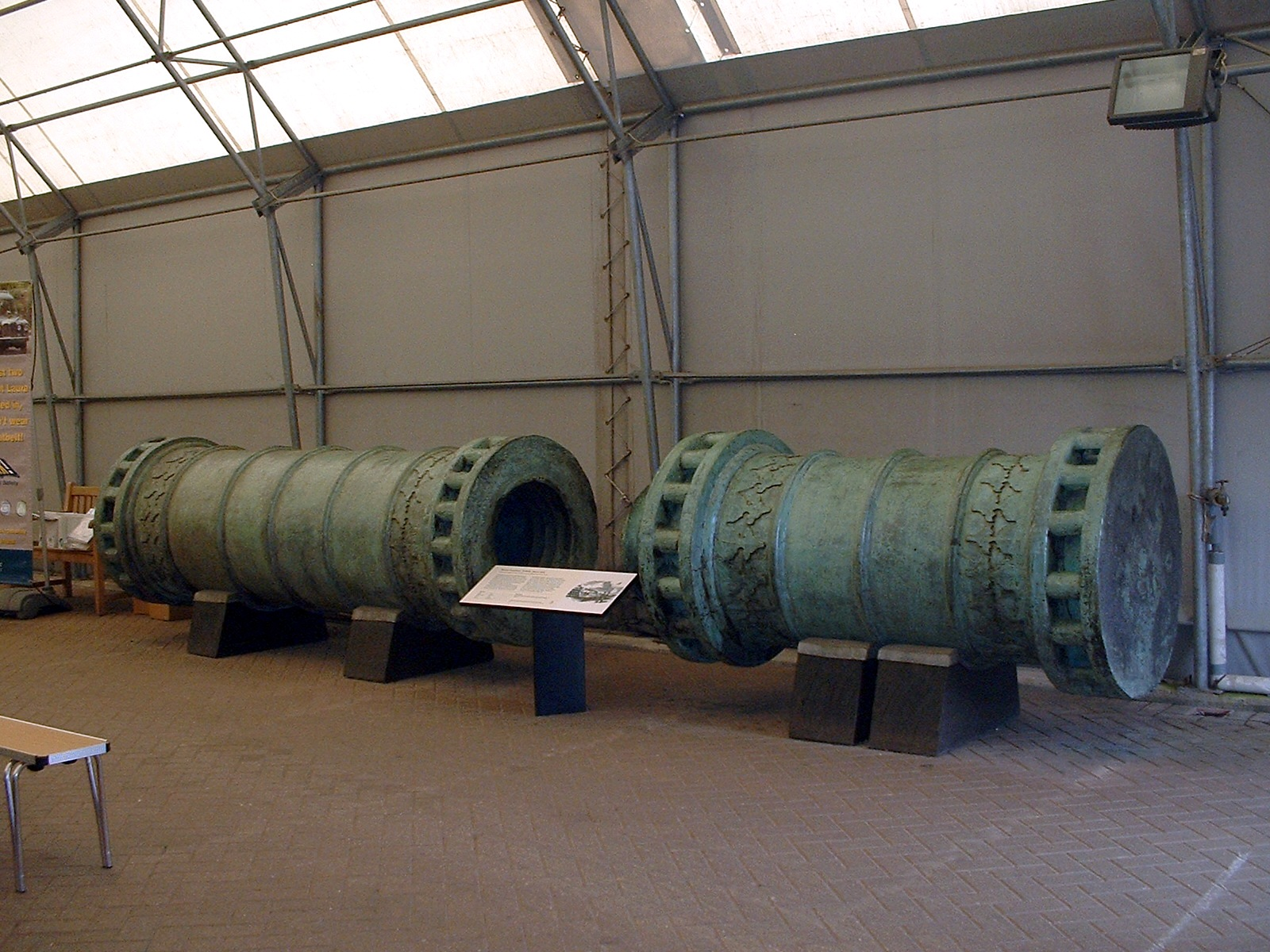
- Dismantled Dardanelles Gun at Fort Nelson, Hampshire, overlooking Portsmouth
- Type: Bombard

Service history
- Used by: Ottoman Empire
- Wars: Dardanelles operation

Production history
- Designer: Munir Ali
- Produced: 1464

Specifications
- Mass: 17,069 kg (37,631 lb)
- Barrel length: 518 cm (204 in)
- Diameter: 1,054 mm (41.5 in)
- Caliber: 918 mm (36.1 in)
- Action: slow match
- Elevation: none
- Traverse: none
- Feed system: muzzle loader

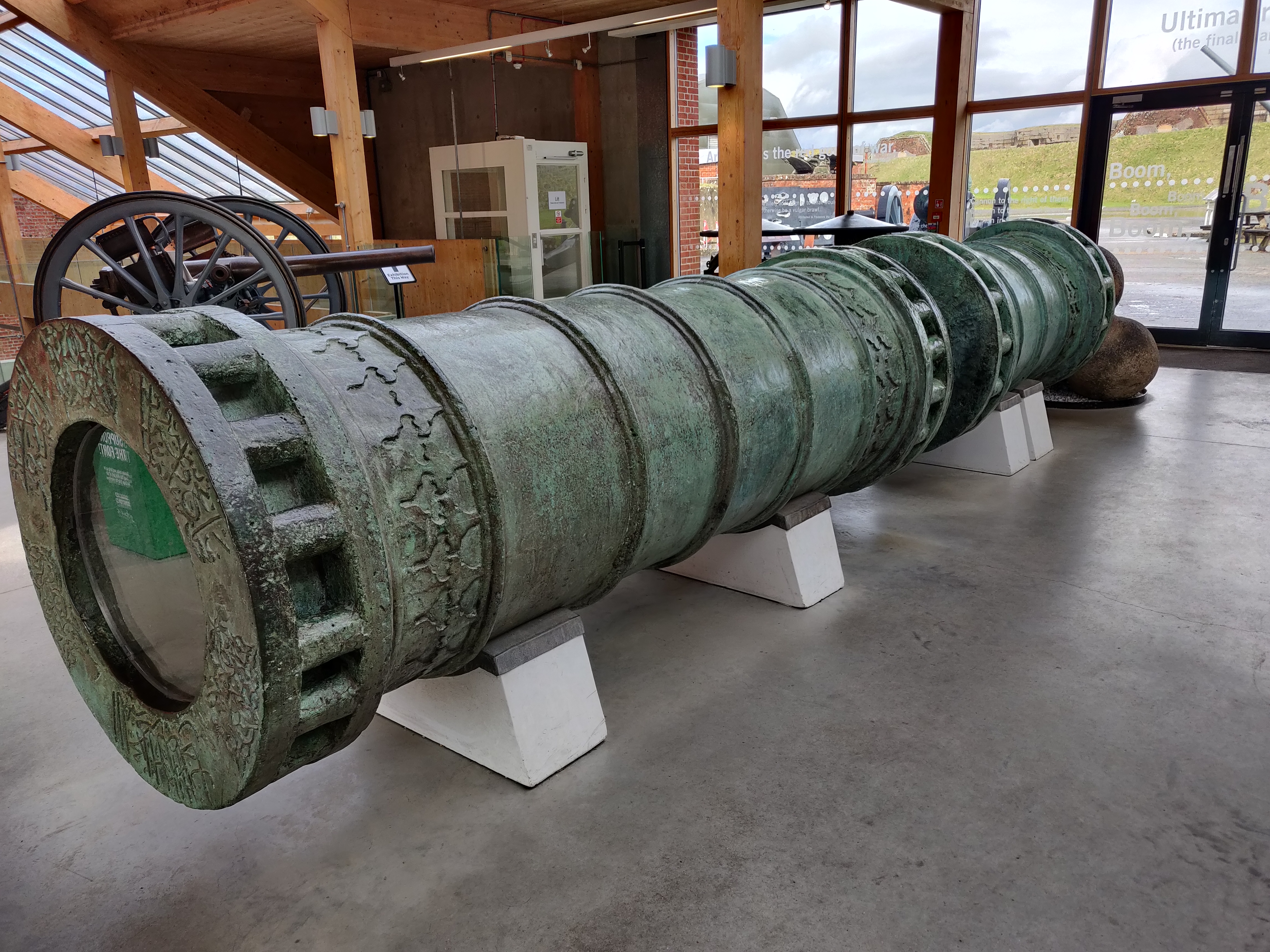
A Dardanelles Gun made by Munir Ali, one of the Tophane-i Amire (Royal Arsenal) masters, 1464

The Dardanelles Gun or Great Bronze Gun (Turkish: Şahi topu or simply Şahi) is a 15th-century siege cannon, specifically a super-sized bombard, which saw action in the 1807 Dardanelles operation. It was built in 1464 by Ottoman military engineer Munir Ali and modelled after the Basilic, the bombard crafted by Orban that was used for the Ottoman siege of Constantinople in 1453.

== History ==
The Dardanelles Gun was cast in bronze in 1464 by Munir Ali with a weight of 17 tonnes and a length of 5.18 m (17.0 ft), being capable of firing stone balls of up to 0.635 m diameter (25.0 in). The powder chamber and the barrel are connected by the way of a screw mechanism, allowing easier transport of the unwieldy device.

Such super-sized bombards had been employed in Ottoman warfare and in Western European siege warfare since the beginning of the 15th century. According to Gábor Ágoston, the technology could have been introduced from other Islamic countries which had earlier used cannons or from Europe. The Ottoman army successfully deployed large bombards at the siege of Salonica in 1430, and against the Hexamilion wall at the Isthmus of Corinth in 1446.

At the siege of Constantinople in 1453, the Ottomans used anywhere from 12 to 62 cannons, built at foundries that employed Turkish cannon founders and technicians, most notably Saruca and Orban. Most cannons at the siege were built by Ottoman engineers, including a large bombard by Saruca, while one cannon was built by Orban, who also contributed a large bombard. Ali's piece is assumed to have closely followed the outline of the large bombards used at the siege of Constantinople.

Along with other huge cannons, the Dardanelles Gun was still present for duty more than 340 years later in 1807, when a Royal Navy force appeared and commenced the Dardanelles Operation. Turkish forces loaded the ancient relics with propellant and projectiles, then fired them at the British ships. The British squadron suffered 28 casualties from this bombardment. A spherical round made of granite, 63 centimetres (25 in) of diameter, and a density of 2600 kg/cubic metre, has a weight of 340 kilograms (750 lb).

By 1850, the gun was being considered for scrapping. This was avoided after John Henry Lefroy attempted to get it added to the Royal Military Depository, a British military museum. In 1866, on the occasion of a state visit, Sultan Abdulaziz gave the Dardanelles Gun to Queen Victoria as a present. It became part of the Royal Armouries collection and was displayed to visitors at the Tower of London. In 1989, it was moved to Fort Nelson, Hampshire, overlooking Portsmouth.

== See also ==
- List of the largest cannon by calibre

== Sources ==
- ffoulkes, Charles (July 1930). "The 'Dardanelles' Gun at the Tower". The Antiquaries Journal. 10 (3): 217–227. doi:10.1017/S0003581500041032.
- Schmidtchen, Volker (1977a). "Riesengeschütze des 15. Jahrhunderts. Technische Höchstleistungen ihrer Zeit". Technikgeschichte. 44 (2): 153–157.
- Schmidtchen, Volker (1977b). "Riesengeschütze des 15. Jahrhunderts. Technische Höchstleistungen ihrer Zeit". Technikgeschichte. 44 (3): 213–237.
- Ágoston, Gábor (2016) [1994]. "Ottoman Artillery and European Military Technology in the Fifteenth and Seventeenth Centuries". In Hammer, Paul E. J. (ed.). Warfare in Early Modern Europe 1450–1660. Routledge. pp. 289–322. doi:10.4324/9781315234342. ISBN 978-0-7546-2529-2.
