= Basilic (cannon) =

15th-century siege cannon

Basilica, Urban's, or the Ottoman Cannon
- Type: Siege artillery
- Place of origin: Ottoman Empire

Service history
- In service: 1453
- Used by: Ottoman Army
- Wars: Fall of Constantinople

Production history
- Manufacturer: Orban or Urban

Specifications
- Mass: 19 tons
- Length: 27 ft (8.2 m)
- Diameter: 2.5 ft (0.76 m)
- Caliber: 30 in (760 mm), 1200 lb (540 kg) cannonballs
- Rate of fire: 7 shots per day
- Maximum firing range: c. 1 mi (1.6 km) - 2 km (1.2 mi)

The Basilic or Basilica cannon, i.e. 'royal gun', as the Greeks called it, also known as Urban's cannon or the Ottoman Cannon, was a very large-calibre cannon designed by Orban or Urban, a Hungarian cannon engineer, at a time when cannons were still new. It is one of the largest cannons ever built.

The cannon was first offered in 1452 to Byzantine emperor Constantine XI, who was not able to bring up the sum required for its construction. It was then offered to the Ottoman Sultan Mehmed II, who ordered the cannon built after learning that it could smash through walls using a large projectile. Huge amounts of scrap bronze were needed in order to cast the 27 ft (8.2 m) long cannon, with 8 in (200 mm) thick walls. When it was completed, the cannon was used by the Ottoman Army during the 1453 siege which led to the fall of Constantinople, and played a key role in damaging the city walls. It was one of a total of some 70 guns built by Orban for Mehmed.

Orban managed to build this giant cannon within three months at Adrianople. Due to its size, it was dragged by 60–90 oxen and 200–400 men over the 140 mi (230 km) distance to Constantinople. The cannonball could be shot at a distance of somewhere between one mile (1.6 km) and 1.2 mi (1.9 km), and weighed 1,200 pounds (540 kg). Mehmed placed his artillery in 14 or 15 batteries facing the city walls. The Basilica in particular was horribly powerful, and when it hit, it caused massive damage to the stone-built fortifications. Due to its tremendous recoil, the cannon also killed many of its operators. The heat developed by each detonation prevented the cannon from being fired more than seven times per day. Additionally, due to the impurities in the cast bronze, the intense heat and shock created by the charge led to hairline fractures, and after each shot the barrel had to be soaked in warm oil to prevent cold air from penetrating and enlarging the fissures. Orban's team had to shoot, maintain, and even repair the many cannons they had built. The Basilica soon split into several pieces, killing many in the process. Quickly fixed with iron hoops, it eventually had to be abandoned. Ultimately, it lasted all of six weeks before becoming non-functional.

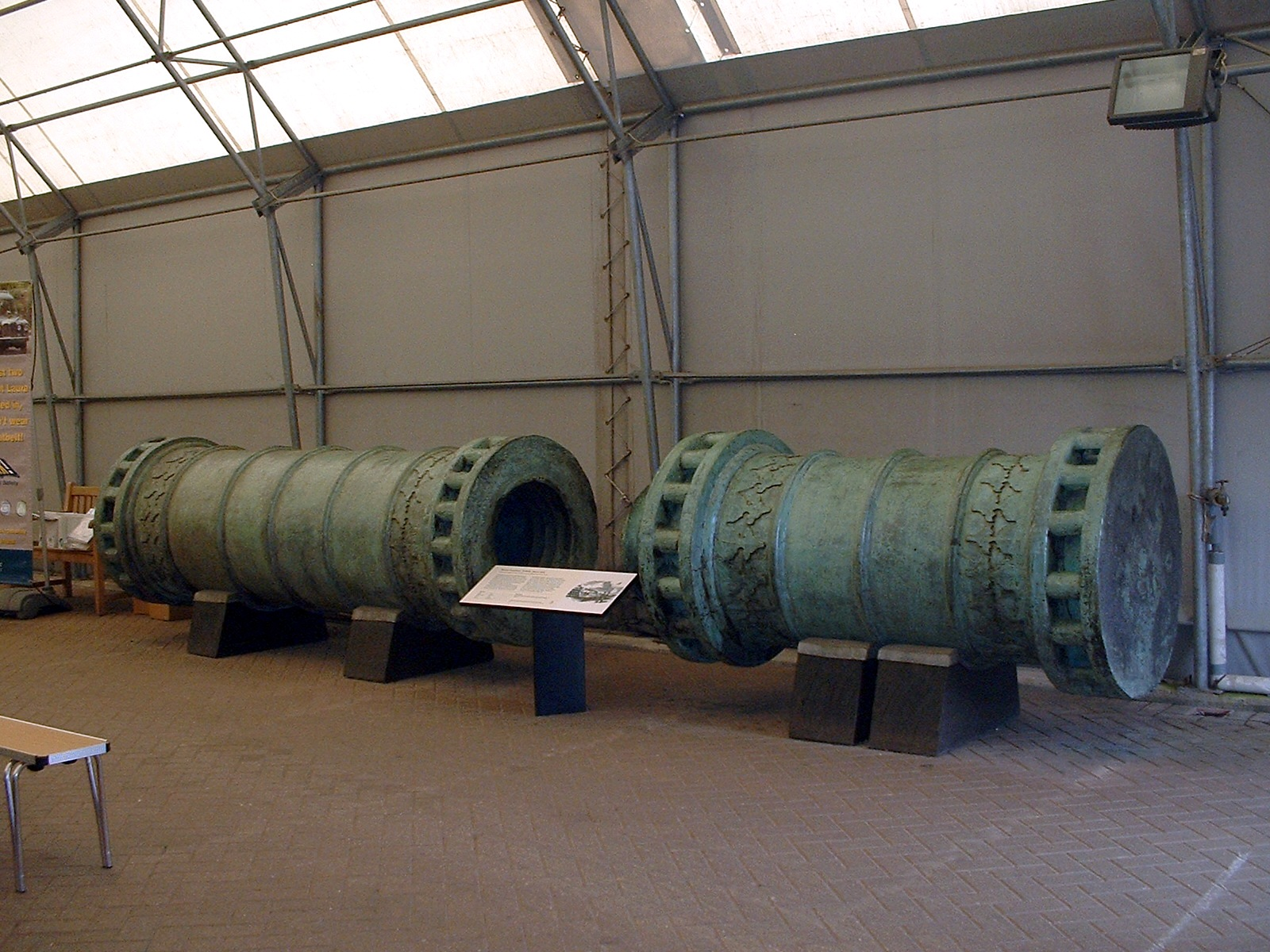
The Dardanelles Gun is a similar super-sized cannon that was built in 1464 by the Turkish military engineer Munir Ali and modelled after the cannon built by Orban.
