= Faule Grete =

- Type: Cannon
- Place of origin: Marienburg, Monastic state of the Teutonic Knights

Service history
- Used by: Margrave Frederick I of Brandenburg

Production history
- Produced: 1409

Specifications
- Mass: 4.6 t
- Length: 250 cm
- Barrel length: 150 cm
- Shell weight: 170 kg
- Caliber: 50 cm (ball diameter)

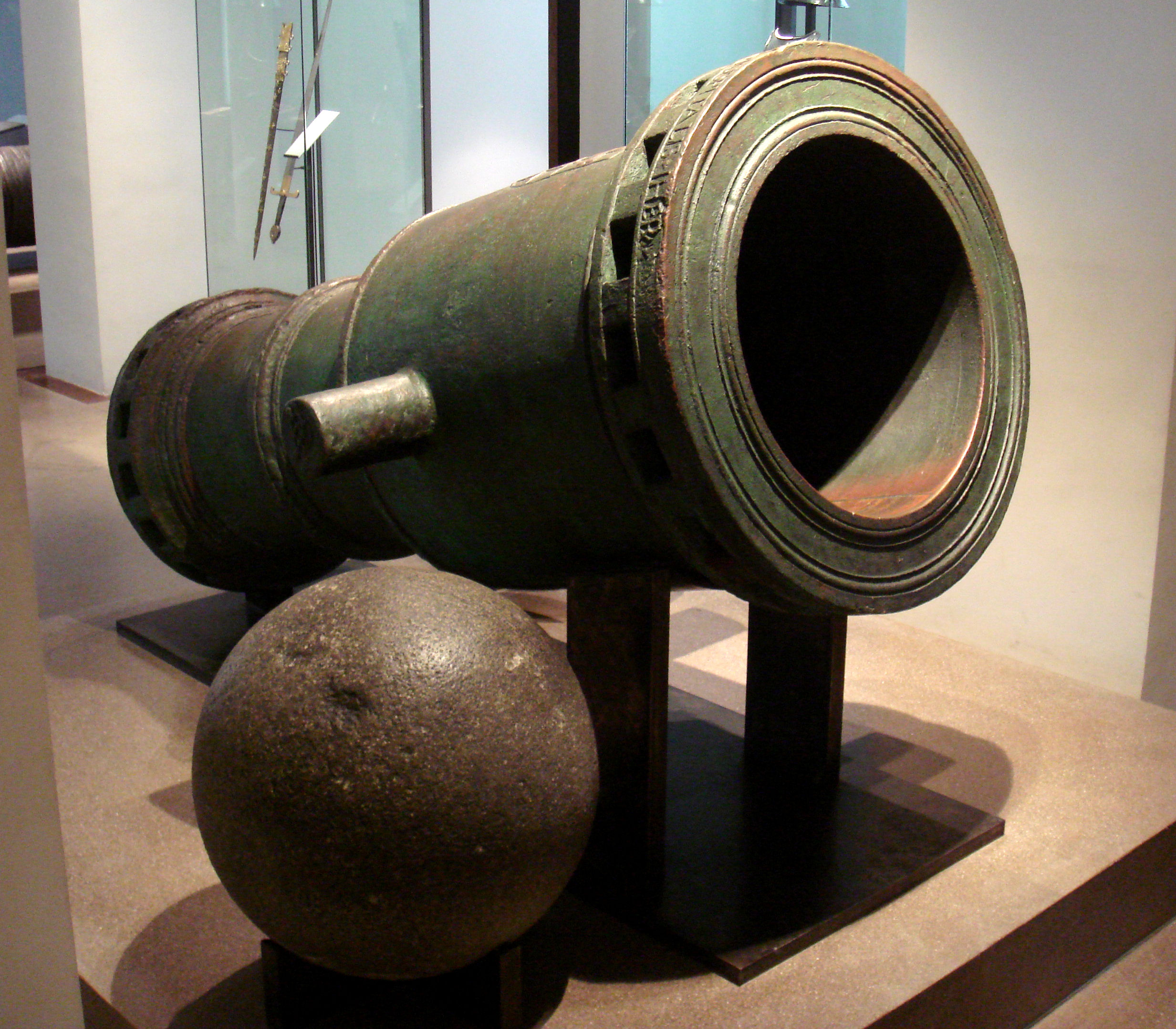
Bronze bombard of the Knights Hospitaller cast in 1480. The Faule Grete was arguably similar in shape, although larger in size.

The Faule Grete (German for Lazy Grete, alluding to the lack of mobility and slow rate of fire of such super-sized cannon) was a medieval large-calibre cannon of the Teutonic Order. The bronze bombard was cast in 1409 in the cannon foundry of the Marienburg by the gunfounder Heynrich Dumechen. According to the account books of the order, the construction costs amounted to 278.5 marks, a sum equivalent to c. 1160 oxen.

Borrowed by Margrave Frederick I of Brandenburg in 1413, the cannon was instrumental in breaking the opposition of the domestic knighthood within three weeks, allowing Fredrick to lay the foundation for the rise of his Hohenzollern dynasty which later came to rule Prussia and the German Empire.

Besides the Faule Grete, a number of 15th-century European large-calibre weapons are known to have been employed primarily in siege warfare, including the wrought-iron Pumhart von Steyr, Dulle Griet and Mons Meg as well as the cast-bronze Grose Bochse (also made by the Teutonic Knights) and Faule Mette.

== See also ==
- List of the largest cannon by caliber
