= Tomb of Rumi Khan =

Mausoleum located in Ahmednagar in the Indian state of Maharashtra

Rumi Khan's Tomb, also known as Pila Gumbad ("yellow dome") is a mausoleum located in Ahmednagar, in the Indian state of Maharashtra.

== Background ==
Rumi Khan was a nobleman and a gun-caster in the Ahmednagar Sultanate, who died sometime in the late 16th century. The tomb was probably constructed during his lifetime, and used as a garden pavilion before his interment. This garden probably contained a gun-casting foundry, and it is possible that the Malik-i Maidan was cast here.

== Description ==
The tomb is constructed entirely out of dressed stone, without any plaster ornamentation on the exterior. It measures about 26 feet square, and has a height of about 40 feet. The walls are four feet thick. Externally, each wall consists of two horizontal floors, divided by a band of merlon-shaped crestings. Each floor has three recessed arches. Windows and doors are provided in the central arches of each wall. The building is surmounted by a lofty dome resting upon a drum, adorned with a band of lotus-petal moldings. Flat-roofed kiosks are placed at all four corners of the roof, and a trefoil-patterned parapet runs in between them.
