= List of the largest cannon by caliber =

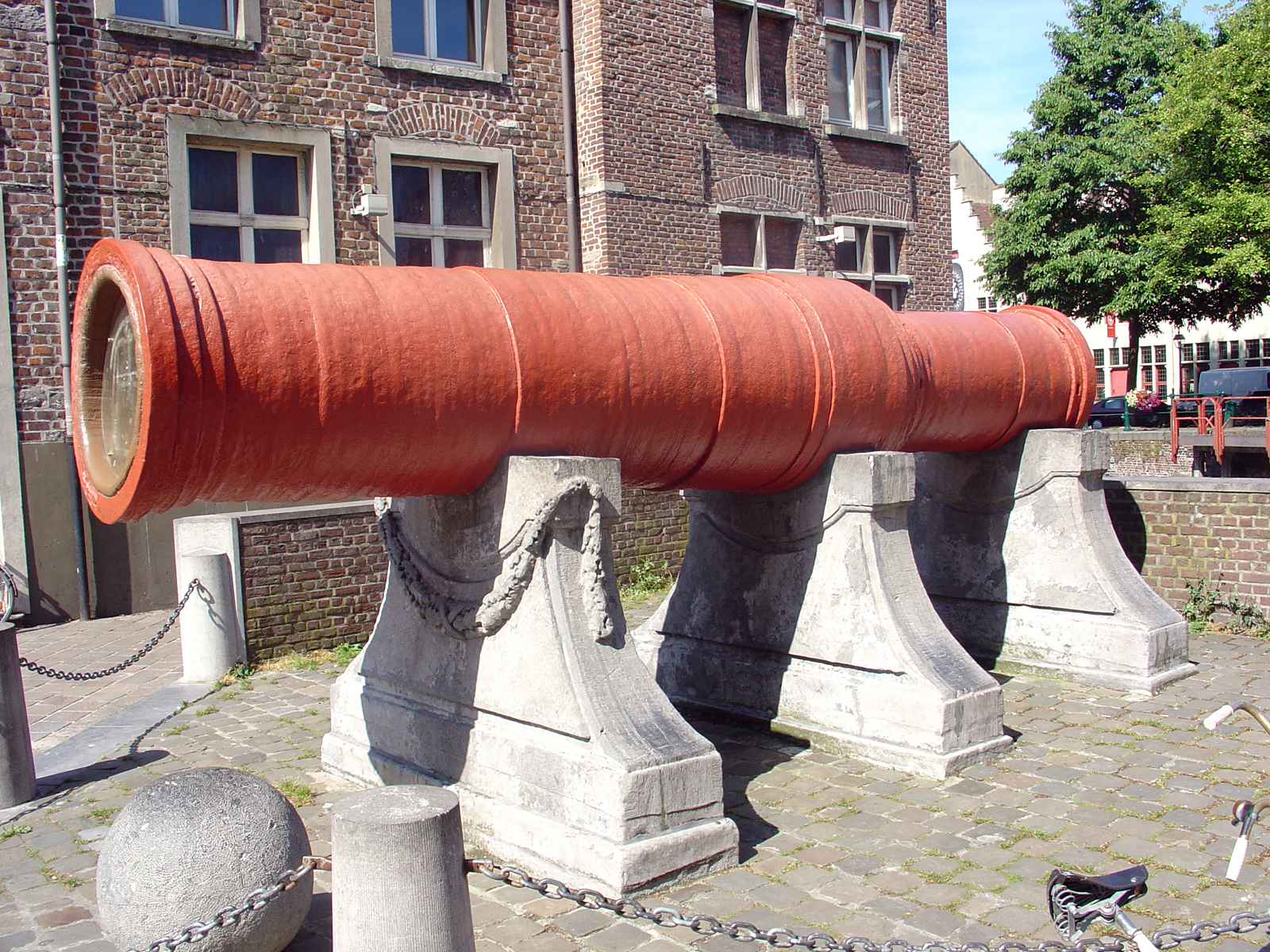
Early 15th-century Flemish giant cannon Dulle Griet at Ghent (caliber of 660 mm)

This list contains all types of cannon through the ages listed in decreasing caliber size. For the purpose of this list, the development of large-calibre artillery can be divided into three periods, based on the kind of projectiles used, due to their dissimilar characteristics, and being practically incommensurable in terms of their bore size:

- Stone balls: Cannon of extraordinary bore, which fired stone balls, were first introduced at the turn of the 14th to 15th century in Western Europe. Following a logic of increasing performance through size, they had evolved from small handguns to giant wrought-iron or cast-bronze bombards within a span of just several decades.
- Iron balls and shot: By the 16th century, however, a general switch from stone balls to smaller, but much more effective iron projectiles was in full swing. This and the parallel tendency towards standardized, rapid-firing cannon made the enormously costly and logistically demanding giant guns soon obsolete in the European theatre (with the exception of the odd showpiece).
- Explosive shells: In the Industrial Age, artillery was again revolutionized by the introduction of explosive shells, beginning with the Paixhans guns. Breakthroughs in metallurgy and modes of production were followed up by new experimentation with super-sized caliber weapons, culminating in the steel colossi of the two World Wars. In the post-war era, the development of extremely overpowered artillery was gradually abandoned in favour of missile technology, while heavy guns are still demanded by various arms of the service.

The list includes only cannons that were actually built, whether or not they were ever used in combat; excluded are cannons that existed only as concepts, ideas, proposals, plans, drawings, or diagrams. Also excluded are incomplete cannons that were only partially built (meaning not a fully built single complete artillery piece of the cannon type in question). The list does include completed cannons that were either never fired, or there is debate or insufficient evidence about whether they were ever fired. Naturally, the list only includes real cannons (i.e., those made from metal and meant to fire projectiles with gunpowder to cause major damage); excluded are replicas and other non-real cannons (e.g., those made from plastic or fiberglass).

== Cannon by caliber ==
=== Stone balls ===
Heyday: 15th to 17th centuries

Image	Caliber (mm)	Name	Type	Produced	Place of origin	Made by	Remarks
A view of the Tsar Pushka, showing its massive bore and cannonballs.	890 (Note: The bombard has a conical bore of 82.5–90 cm.)	Tsar Cannon	Bombard	1586	Tsardom of Russia	Andrey Chokhov	1 made; it is debated whether the cannon was ever fired (evidence of gunpowder residue in the gun has been found in some studies); never used in combat; 1 made; 1 survives
Backside of the Pumhart von Steyr	820 (Note: The bombard has a conical bore of 76–88 cm.)	Pumhart von Steyr	Bombard	Early 15th century	House of Habsburg, Holy Roman Empire		1 made; 1 survives
	745 (Note: Bown indicates a larger bore of 36 in (914 mm), but Hollenback says that Kritoboulos, a contemporary source, indicates a circumference of 12 spans and concludes that in this case the smallest of three possible sizes of span is the correct unit, giving 0.745 m for the bore. Hollenback also notes that granite cannonballs dating from the siege of Constantinople had a diameter of 0.711 m and could have been shot from this weapon using a wooden sabot.)	Basilic	Bombard	1453	Ottoman Empire	Orban	1 made; used in combat; none survive
Engraving by Johann Georg Beck from 1717	735 (Note: The bombard has a conical bore of 67–80 cm.)	Faule Mette	Bombard	1411	City of Brunswick, Holy Roman Empire	Henning Bussenschutte	1 made; fired 12 times during its existence; none survive
The Malik-i-Maidan at the western ramparts of Bijapur fort	700	Malik-i-Maidan	Bombard	1549	City of Bijapur, Adil Shahi dynasty	Muhammad Bin Husain Rumi	1 made; used in combat; 1 survives
The Dulle Griet at Ghent, close to the Friday Market square in the old town	660	Dulle Griet	Bombard	First half of 15th century	City of Ghent, County of Flanders, Duchy of Burgundy		3 made (the Dulle Griet, the Mons Meg, and a third piece that went to France); used in combat; 2 survive (those named)
	635	Thanjavur cannon (Rajagopala Beerangi)	Bombard	1620	Thanjavur Nayaks	Vikas Naikwade	1 made; used in combat; 1 survives
Dismantled Dardanelles Gun in 2007 at Fort Nelson	635	Dardanelles Gun or Great Bronze Gun	Bombard	1464	Ottoman Empire	Munir Ali	3 made; used in combat; 1 survives
	530	Galeazzesca Vittoriosa	Bombard	1471	Duchy of Milan Caliber: 530 mm (ball diameter); Mass: ~ 8.6-8.8 t; Shell weight: 209 kg	Giovanni Garbagnate	
	520	Faule Grete	Bombard	1409	Monastic state of the Teutonic Knights	Heynrich Dumechen	1 made; used in combat
	520–820	Grose Bochse	Bombard	1408	Monastic state of the Teutonic Knights		1 made
Mons Meg with its 50 cm caliber cannonballs	520	Mons Meg	Bombard	1449	Mons, County of Hainaut, Duchy of Burgundy	Jehan Cambier	3 made (the Mons Meg, the Dulle Griet, and a third piece that went to France); used in combat; 2 survive (those named)
Bronze bombard of the Knights Hospitaller cast in 1480.	510 (Note: The bombard has a conical bore of 45–58 cm.)		Bombard	1480	Knights Hospitaller		

=== Iron balls and shot ===
Heyday: 16th to 19th centuries. The list contains only cannons of caliber of 6 inch (152.4mm) or larger.

Image	Caliber (mm)	Name	Type	Produced	Place of origin	Made by	Remarks
	508	Dahlgren smoothbore cannons, XX inch	Naval gun	1864	American Civil War	John A. Dahlgren	4 made; never used in combat
	508	M. 1864 20-inch Rodman gun		1864	American Civil War	Thomas Jackson Rodman	2 made; 2 survive
	508	20 inch "Perm Tsar Cannon" or "Perm Giant" (ru)	Naval gun (technology demonstrator never installed to a ship)	1868	Russian Empire	Motovilikha manufacturing plant	1 made; a total of 314 shots were fired in tests; never used in combat; 1 survives
	390	Roaring Meg	Mortar	1646	Kingdom of England	Created by Colonel Birch for the Siege of Goodrich Castle	
Dalmadal	286	Dal Madal Kaman/Dala Mardana		1565 or 1742 (differing sources)	Mallabhum, Malla dynasty	Jagannath Karmakar	1 made; according to an Indian local legend of divine intervention, fired only once in battle; 1 survives
Kanone Greif	280	Kanone Greif	Scharfmetze ("medium size")	1524	Electorate of Trier	Master Simon	1 made; evidence of being fired exists; no evidence of use in combat exists; 1 survives
The Jaivana cannon	280	Jaivana		1720	Jaigarh Fort, Jaipur Riyasat		1 made; fired once; never used in combat; 1 survives
	254	Zamzama		1757	Lahore, Durrani Empire	Shah Nazir	2 made; used in combat; 1 survives
	206.2	68-pounder gun		1841	UK	William Dundas	No. built In excess of 2,000
	174.8	36-pounder long gun		1600s	France		In use from 1600s to 1800s, thousands made
Jahan Kosha	152	Jahan Kosha Cannon		1637	Bengal Subah, Mughal Empire	Janardan Karmakar	1 made; 1 survives
Sebastopol	?	Sebastopol	Mortar	1868	Ethiopia		1 made; 1 survives

Twenty-inch (508 mm) Rodman and Dahlgren smoothbore cannons were cast in 1864 during the American Civil War. The Rodmans were used as seacoast defense. Although not used as intended, two 20-inch Dahlgrens were intended to be mounted in the turrets of USS Dictator and USS Puritan. Both Rodman gun and Dahlgren gun were designed to fire both shot and explosive shell.

=== Explosive shells ===
Heyday: 19th to 20th centuries. The list includes 16-inch (400 mm) guns and larger calibers.

Image	Caliber (mm)	Name	Type	Produced	Place of origin	Made by	Remarks
Mallet's Mortar with 36 inch shells which would have contained 480lb (217kg) of gunpowder	914.4	Mallet's mortar	Mortar	1857	UK	Robert Mallet	2 made; a total of 19 rounds were fired in tests; never used in combat; 2 survive
Little David at the Aberdeen Proving Ground	914.4	Little David	Mortar	1945	US		1 prototype made and used in testing only; the gun was fired; never used in combat; 1 survives
The Schwerer Gustav Railway gun	800	Schwerer Gustav	Railway gun	1941	Nazi Germany	Krupp	1 made (sister gun to Dora); used in combat; largest cannon in history by projectile weight; none survive
US Soldier with 800 mm gun dora	800	Dora	Railway gun	1942	Nazi Germany	Krupp	1 made (sister gun to Schwerer Gustav); unknown if used in combat; largest cannon in history by projectile weight; none survive
The Mortier monstre	610	Mortier monstre	Mortar	1832 (1) and 1834 (1)	Belgium	Henri-Joseph Paixhans	2 made; used in combat (only one gun used during only two days of Siege of Antwerp (1832), firing about 15 shots and no other use in combat); at least 1 survives
60 cm Karl-Gerät "Ziu" firing in Warsaw, August 1944	600 (later, 540)	Karl-Gerät	Mortar	1940	Nazi Germany	Rheinmetall	7 made; used in combat; one survives
	530	53 cm/52 Gerät 36	Naval gun (never installed to a ship)	1941	Nazi Germany	Krupp	1 made; only one prototype gun made (with some secondary components never actually made); only fired experimentally; never used in combat; none survive
	520	Obusier de 520 modèle 1916	Railway gun	1918	France	Schneider et Cie	2 made; used in combat; none survive
	508	Dahlgren smoothbore cannons, XX inch	Naval gun (never installed to a ship)	1864	US	John A. Dahlgren	4 made; never used in combat
	508	M. 1864 20-inch Rodman gun	Naval gun (never installed to a ship)	1864	US	Thomas Jackson Rodman	2 made (some sources say 3: 2 for Fort Hamilton in New York and third for USS Puritan); fired 8 times; never used in combat; 2 survive
	508	20 inch "Perm Tsar Cannon" or "Perm Giant" (ru)	Naval gun (technology demonstrator never installed to a ship)	1868	Russian Empire	Motovilikha manufacturing plant	1 made; a total of 314 shots were fired in tests; never used in combat; 1 survives
The 36 cm 45 caliber 5th Year Type at Kamegakubi Proving Grounds in December, 1945. The actual size is 48 cm.	480	45 caliber 5 Year Type 36 cm gun	Naval gun (never installed to a ship)	1918–1922	Empire of Japan	Kure Naval Arsenal	1 made (some sources say 2); only a prototype gun ever made; fired only experimentally; never used in battle; none survive
The Japanese battleship Yamato under construction	460	46 cm/45 Type 94 naval gun	Naval gun	1940	Empire of Japan	Kure Naval Arsenal	~27 made; used in combat (both Yamato and Musashi fired their guns against enemy only on one occasion (separate battles however)); main guns of battleships Yamato and Musashi; the largest ever ship-installed gun by caliber; none survive
Boche Buster at Catterick, 12 December 1940	457.2	BL 18-inch railway howitzer	Railway gun	1920	UK	Elswick Ordnance Company	5 made; never used in combat; one survives
An 18-inch gun fitted to HMS Furious (47) in a single-gun turret (1917)	457.2	BL 18-inch Mk I naval gun	Naval gun	1916	UK	Elswick Ordnance Company	3 made; used in combat (85 rounds were fired in combat); the largest ever ship-installed gun by shell weight; none survive
A display at the U.S. Navy Dahlgren Naval Weapons Facility	457.2	18-inch/47-caliber Mark A gun	Naval gun (experimental; never installed to a ship)	1942	US		(Note: 1 made; the individual gun in question, originally 18 inches (460 mm) in caliber and designated 18"/48 Mark 1, was used as an experimental testbed gun and was modified a couple of times in its life, most remarkably when it was converted into a 16 inches (410 mm) gun and designated 16"/56 Mark 4 and then again when it was restored to 18-inch gun and designated 18"/47 Mark A; the 18"/48 Mark 1 gun was never finished, with the prototype 18"/48 Mark 1 about halfway completed when its development was stopped and the decision was later made to complete the gun as 16-inch gun 16"/56 Mark 4, which was finished and fired experimentally multiple times; even later, the 16"/56 Mark 4 gun was decided to be restored to 18-inches and designated 18"/47 Mark A and fired a few times experimentally; this entry refers to the experimental gun 18"/47 Mark A; never used in combat; one survives)
Elswick 100-ton gun at Gibraltar	450	100-ton gun (RML 17.72 inch gun)	Naval gun	1877	UK	Elswick Ordnance Company	15 made; fired numerous times, though never in anger; never used in combat; 2 survive
Admiral Felice Napoleone Canevaro and the officers of Italia pose under a pair of her 17-inch (432-mm) guns.	431.8	432 mm (17 in) guns	Naval gun	(?)1877	(?)UK	(?)Elswick Ordnance Company	Guns installed in Italia-class ironclad and Italian ironclad Andrea Doria
One of the first Big Berthas being readied for firing	420	Big Bertha	Howitzer	1910s	German Empire	Krupp	12 made; used in combat; none survive
Side view of a Gamma-Gerät	420	42 cm Gamma howitzer	Mortar	1910s	German Empire / Nazi Germany	Krupp	10 made; used in combat; no known survivors
2B1 Oka	420	2B1 Oka	Self-propelled artillery	1957	Soviet Union	KBM, Kirov Plant	4 made; never used in combat; at least one survives
Austro-Hungarian 42 cm Haubitze M. 14/16	420	42 cm Haubitze M. 14/16	Howitzer	1914–1918	Austria-Hungary	Škoda	8 made; used in combat
HARP 16-inch (410 mm) gun	417	Project HARP 16.4 inch gun	Research gun	1962–1968	US; Canada		Repurposed American 16 inch naval guns used for high-altitude atmosphere studies. 1 made, located in Barbados; never used in combat; 1 survive
BL 16.25 inch naval gun	412.8	BL 16.25-inch Mk I naval gun	Naval gun	1888	UK	Elswick Ordnance Company	12 made; never used in combat
406 mm gun from Japanese battleship Mutsu	410	41 cm/45 3rd Year Type	Naval gun	1920	Empire of Japan	Kure and Muroran Ironworks	About 40 made; used in combat; at least 2 survive
Experimental 41cm howitzer	410	Experimental 41-cm-Howitzer	Howitzer	1926	Empire of Japan	Japan Steel Works	
Crowds in New York watch the shipment of the 16-inch coastal defense gun M1895, January 1915	406.4	16-inch gun M1895	Coastal artillery	1895	US	Watervliet Arsenal	1 made; never used in combat; none survive
	406.4	16-inch/45-caliber Mark 6 gun	Naval gun	1936	US	US Navy	
	406.4	16-inch railway howitzer M1918	Railway gun	1918	US		The US Army built a one-off experimental 16 in (410 mm) railway howitzer M1918 with some influence from the French Obusier de 400 Modèle 1915/1916
16 inch Coastal Defense Gun at Aberdeen Proving Ground	406.4	16-inch/50-caliber M1919 gun	Coastal artillery	1919	US	Watervliet Arsenal	At least 7 made; never used in combat
16-inch howitzer M1920 at Fort Story, Virginia	406.4	16-inch howitzer M1920	Coastal artillery	1920	US	Watervliet Arsenal	Probably 5 made, 4 deployed; never used in combat; none survive
USS Colorado (BB-45) with her 16"/45 caliber gun turrets	406.4	16-inch/45-caliber gun	Naval gun	1914–1920	US	Washington Navy Yard, Bethlehem Steel	41 made
16 inch Mark 2 Gun at the Washington Navy Yard	406.4	16-inch/50-caliber Mark 2 gun	Naval gun	1917–1922	US	Washington Navy Yard, Bethlehem Steel	71 made
16-inch/50 caliber Mark 3 gun on proof mounting, Aberdeen Proving Ground, Maryland	406.4	16-inch/50-caliber Mark 3 gun	Naval gun		US	Washington Navy Yard, Bethlehem Steel	
Port/forward turret on HMS Inflexible	406.4	80-ton gun (RML 16 inch gun)	Naval gun	1874	UK	Royal Gun Factory	8 made; used in combat; 2 survive
	406 .4	406 mm/45 (16") Pattern 1914	Naval gun (never installed to a ship)	1914	UK; Russia	Vickers	Made in UK for Russian battleships during WW1, although the battleships in question were never built; only 1 prototype gun made and proved (gun designated by Vickers as No. 1712A); never used in battle; none survive
The single exact 18-inch gun that was later modified into 16-inch gun, fitted to HMS Furious (47) in a single-gun turret (1917)	406.4	16 inch conversion of a BL 18-inch Mk I naval gun	Naval gun (never installed to a ship)	1921–1924	UK	Elswick Ordnance Company	1 made; 16-inch conversion of a 18-inch Mk I (40 caliber) gun; an experimental gun used for prototype for the 16"/45 (40.6 cm) Mark I guns destined for the Nelson-class battleships; never used in combat (this gun was not used in combat as 18-inch gun and not used in combat after conversion into 16-inch gun); none survive
Guns of HMS Rodney at maximum elevation, 1940	406.4	BL 16-inch Mk I naval gun	Naval gun	1927	UK		29 made; used in combat
	406.4	BL 16-inch Mark II naval gun	Naval gun (never installed to a ship)	1938	UK		2 or 3 made; never used in combat
	406.4	BL 16-inch Mark III naval gun	Naval gun (never installed to a ship)	1938	UK		2 or 3 made; never used in combat
	406.4	BL 16-inch Mark IV naval gun	Naval gun (never installed to a ship)	1943	UK		1 partial protype made; one BL 16-inch Mark III naval gun was converted into a partial prototype of BL 16-inch Mark IV naval gun; this partial prototype was experimentally fired; never used in combat
Batterie Lindemann gun, 1942	406.4	40.6 cm SK C/34 gun	Naval gun (never installed to a ship)	1934	Nazi Germany	Krupp	at least 12 made
2A3 Kondensator	406.4	2A3 Kondensator 2P	Self-propelled artillery	1956	Soviet Union	KB SM, Kirov Plant	5 made (1 prototype, 4 production); never used in combat; at least one survives
A 406 mm/50 B-37 naval gun in MP-10 test mount	406.4	406 mm/50 B-37 naval gun for Sovetsky Soyuz-class battleships	Naval gun (never installed to a ship)	1937	Soviet Union	Barrikady Plant, Stalingrad	12 made; only one gun proof fired; the proof fired gun was used in the defense of Leningrad in WW2 as land artillery; one survives
A display at the U.S. Navy Dahlgren Naval Weapons Facility	406.4	16-inch/56-caliber Mark 4 gun	Naval gun (never installed to a ship)	1927	US		1 made; never used in combat; one survives (although altered) (Note: The individual gun in question, originally 18 inches (460 mm) in caliber and designated 18"/48 Mark 1, was used as an experimental test-bed gun and was modified a couple of times in its life, most remarkably when it was converted into a 16 inches (410 mm) gun and designated 16"/56 Mark 4 and then again when it was restored to 18-inch gun and designated 18"/47 Mark A; the 18"/48 Mark 1 gun was never finished, with the prototype 18"/48 Mark 1 about halfway completed when its development was stopped and the decision was later made to complete the gun as 16-inch gun 16"/56 Mark 4, which was finished and fired experimentally multiple times; even later, the 16"/56 Mark 4 gun was decided to be restored to 18-inches and designated 18"/47 Mark A and fired a few times experimentally; this entry refers to the experimental gun 16"/56 Mark 4)
16"/45-caliber guns aboard the battleship USS South Dakota (BB-57)	406.4	16-inch/45-caliber Mark 6 gun	Naval gun	1941	US	Washington Navy Yard	Many made for the North Carolina-class battleships and South Dakota class ships; used in combat; many survive (for example onboard museum ships North Carolina, Massachusetts and Alabama)
A cutaway of a turret mounting 16-inch guns	406.4	16-inch/50-caliber Mark 7 gun	Naval gun	1943	US	Washington Navy Yard	Many made for the Iowa-class battleships; used in combat; many survive
	406.4	Project HARP 16 inch gun	Research gun	1962–1968	US; Canada		Repurposed American 16 inch naval guns used for high-altitude atmosphere studies. 2 made, located in Highwater Range in Quebec and in the Yuma Proving Ground; never used in combat
	400	Obusier de 400 Modèle 1915/1916	Railway gun	1915/1916	France		12 railway guns and 4 spare barrels (in total 16 barrels) were made; used in combat; none survive. Captured pieces known in German as 40 cm Haubitze (Eisenbahn) 752(f).

== See also ==
- List of artillery
- M65 atomic cannon, often called Atomic Annie
