= Pumhart von Steyr =

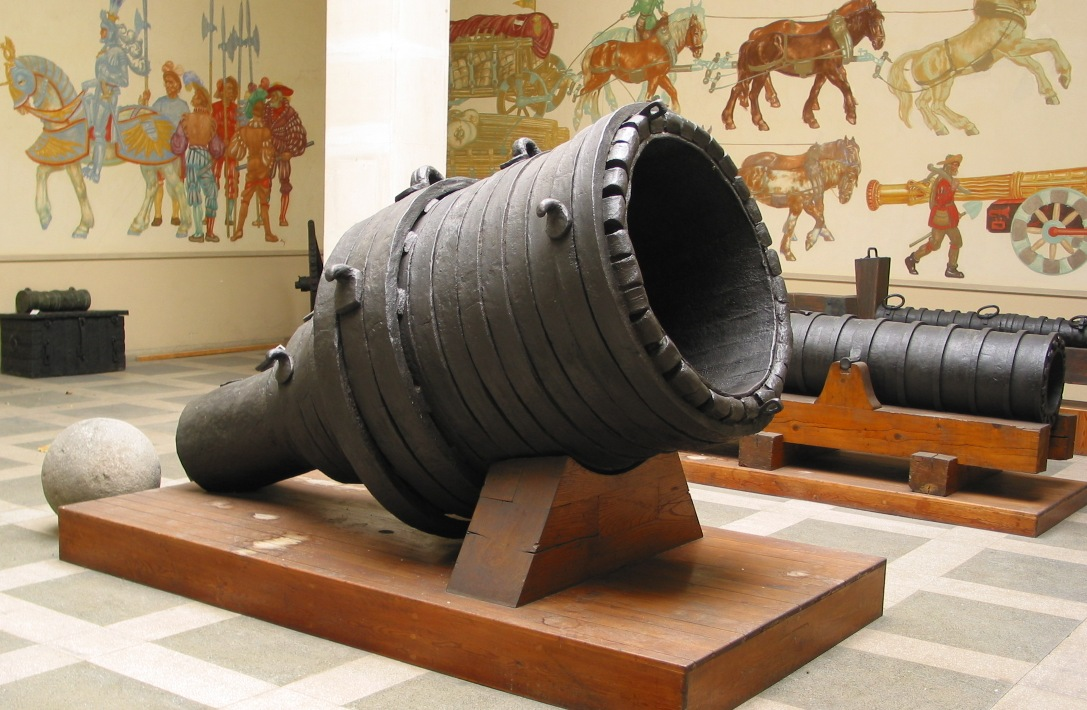
- The Pumhart von Steyr in the Heeresgeschichtliches Museum at Vienna
- Type: Bombard
- Place of origin: Liezen, Styria, Holy Roman Empire

Service history
- In service: Holy Roman Empire
- Used by: Habsburg

Production history
- Designed: Early 15th century
- No. built: 1
- Variants: None

Specifications
- Mass: ~ 8 t (7.9 long tons; 8.8 short tons)
- Length: 2,590 mm (102 in)
- Barrel length: 1,440 mm (57 in)
- Diameter: 760–880 mm (30–35 in) (conical muzzle)
- Crew: 4-6
- Shell weight: 690 kg (1,520 lb)
- Calibre: 800 mm (31 in) (ball diameter)
- Barrels: 1
- Maximum firing range: ~600 m (2,000 ft)
- Sights: None

The Pumhart von Steyr (lit. 'Styrian Bombard') is a medieval large-calibre cannon from Styria, Austria, and the largest known wrought-iron bombard by caliber. It weighs around 8 t (7.9 long tons; 8.8 short tons) and has a length of more than 2.59 m (8 ft 6 in). It was produced in the early 15th century and could fire, according to modern calculations, an 800 mm (31 in) stone ball weighing 690 kg (1,520 lb) to a distance of roughly 600 m (2,000 ft) after being loaded with 15 kg (33 lb) of gunpowder and set at an elevation of 10°.

The bombard is today on display in one of the artillery halls of the Museum of Military History at Vienna.

Besides the Pumhart von Steyr, a number of 15th-century European large-calibre weapons are known to have been employed primarily in siege warfare, including the wrought-iron Mons Meg and Dulle Griet as well as the cast-bronze Faule Mette, Faule Grete and Grose Bochse.

== See also ==
- List of the largest cannon by caliber
