= Bombard (weapon) =

Medieval cannon

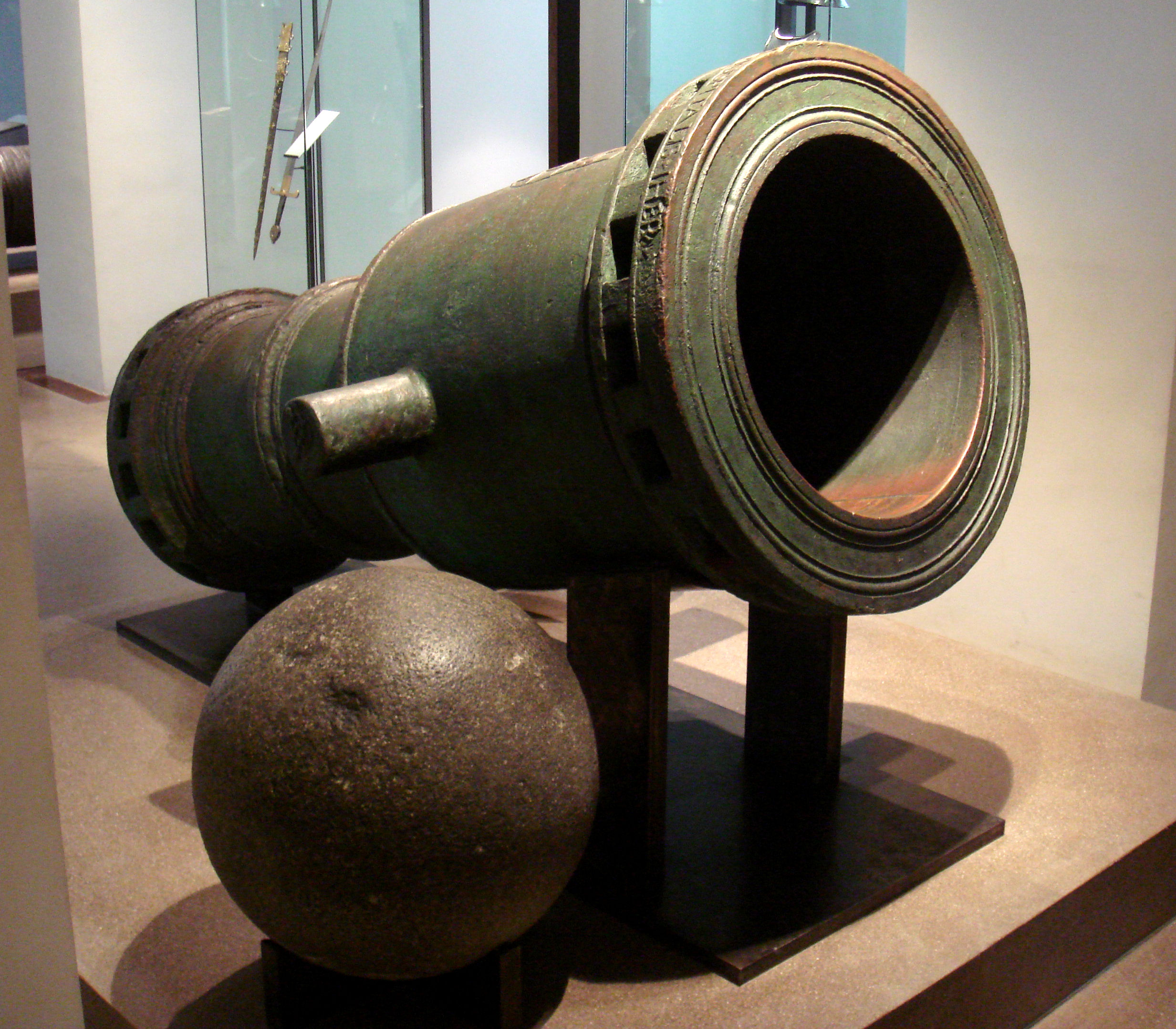
Bombard mortar and granite ball projectile of the Knights of Saint John of Jerusalem, Rhodes, 1480–1500. Founded at the request of Pierre d'Aubusson, the bombard was used for close defense of the walls (100–200 m (110–220 yd)) at the Siege of Rhodes. It fired 260 kg (570 lb) granite balls. The bombard weighs about 3,325 kg (7,330 lb). Musée de l'Armée.

The bombard is a type of cannon or mortar which was used throughout the Late Middle Ages and the early modern period. Bombards were mainly large calibre, muzzle-loading artillery pieces used during sieges to shoot round stone projectiles at the walls of enemy fortifications, enabling troops to break in. Most bombards were made of iron and used gunpowder to launch the projectiles. There are many examples of bombards, including Mons Meg, the Basilic, the Dardanelles Gun, and the handheld bombard.

The weapon provided the name to the Royal Artillery rank of bombardier and the word bombardment.

== Terminology ==
The term bombard was first used to describe guns of any kind from the early to mid-14th century, but it was later applied primarily to large cannons during the 14th to 15th centuries. Despite its strong association with large cannons, there is no standard size for bombards, and the term has been applied to cannons only a meter in length as well as cannons several meters long weighing up to 20 t (20 long tons; 22 short tons).

== History ==
The oldest known representation of a bombard can be found in the Dazu Rock Carvings in China. In 1985, the Canadian historian Robin D. S. Yates was visiting Buddhist cave temples when he saw a sculpture on the wall depicting a demon firing a hand-held bombard. The sculpture was later dated to the early 12th century.

Early bombards also include two Chinese c. 1377 cast-iron mortars weighing over 150 kg (330 lb), each with four trunnions on their barrels.

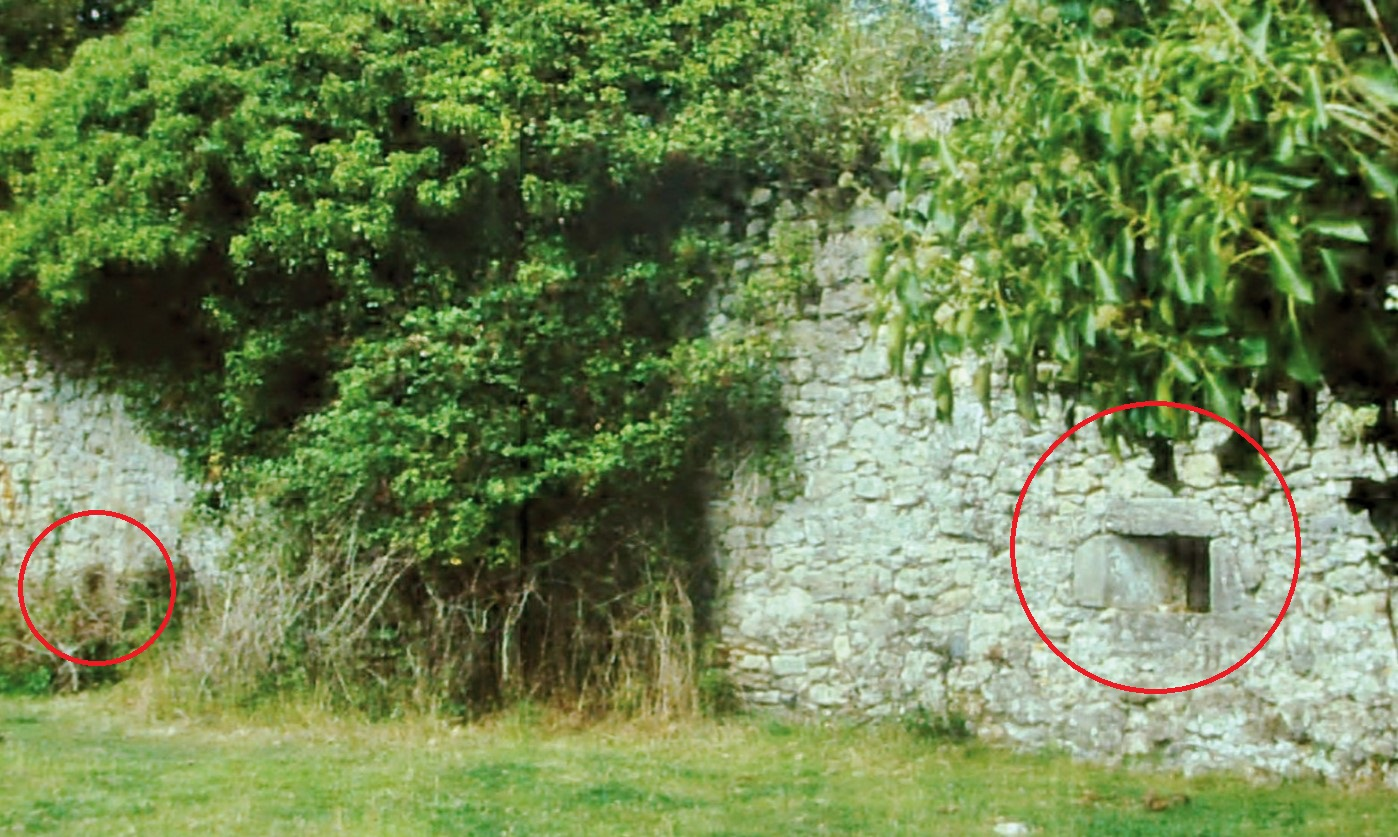
Two gun ports (circled) cut into the seaside walls of Quarr Abbey in 1365.

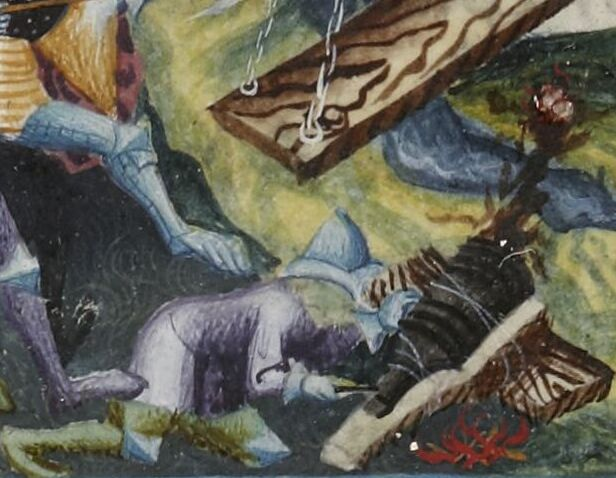
Early depiction of a trestle-mounted bombard in action. Grandes Chroniques de France, 1390–1405

England began using cannons in the early 14th century. Field artillery was deployed by King Edward III at the Battle of Crécy in 1346, and equipment which may have been an artillery piece was listed as captured on a French ship by the English at Sluys as early as 1340. Inverted 'keyhole' gun loops at Bodiam Castle, Cooling Castle, and the Westgate, Canterbury, have all been identified as for firing heavy handguns. These defences are dated 1380–1385. Initially used as defensive weapons, primitive bombards began to be used as siege weapons in the later 14th century. Henry IV and Henry V won battles with the use of bombards. Henry V captured Harfleur with bombards in 1415. King Henry's army later came under artillery fire at the Battle of Agincourt. James II of Scotland destroyed many castles with his one and a half ton cannon named "The Lion".

The French conquest of the English king's holdings in France saw the use of considerable French artillery in the siege role. The French in this period preferred to avoid attacking English longbowmen in open battle and relied on siege tactics. However the last battle of the Hundred Years' War saw English commander John Talbot lead an Anglo-Gascon army against dug-in French troops equipped with 300 pieces of artillery at the Battle of Castillion in 1453. The French camp had been laid out by ordnance officer Jean Bureau to maximise the French artillery arm. The Anglo-Gascons were shot to pieces and Talbot was eventually killed.

Most bombards started with the construction of a wooden core surrounded by iron bars. Then, iron hoops were driven over these bars in order to surround and cover them. The whole structure was then welded with a hammer while it was still hot at about 2,500 °F (1,370 °C). The rings then subsequently cooled and formed over the bars to secure them. The last step was to incinerate the wooden core and to attach a one-piece cast. The complicated procedure required a highly skilled forge who could work quickly and precisely with a hammer.

== Notable examples ==
A notable example of a bombard is Mons Meg, built around 1449 and used by King James II of Scotland. It was very powerful and used for bringing down castle walls. The origins of Mons Meg are not fully known but according to Philip the Good, Duke of Burgundy, it was his idea. It was ordered around 1449 and had similar construction to a typical bombard. However, it was seldom used because of several factors. Mons Meg was capable of firing 180 kg (400 lb) shots and was one of the largest bombards of its time. It is now housed on public display at Edinburgh Castle.

A bombard with a bore of approximately 12 in (30 cm) was found when the moat of Bodiam Castle, Kent, was drained. A muzzle-loader of hoop-and-stave construction, it is believed to be the oldest piece found in England and may be late 14th or very early 15th century. It was possibly dumped in the moat following an abortive siege at the castle during the Wars of the Roses. The original is now at the Royal Artillery Museum at Woolwich, but a copy has been on show at the castle for many years. The Star Gun Company has built a Bodiam Bombard replica while local newspapers report a replica was being fired at the castle for visitors during 2012.

Other known 15th-century very large-calibre guns include the wrought-iron Pumhart von Steyr and Dulle Griet as well as the cast-bronze Faule Mette, Faule Grete, and Grose Bochse. The Tsar Cannon is a late 16th-century show-piece.

The Dardanelles Gun, built in the Ottoman Empire in 1464 by Munir Ali, with a weight of 18.6 t (18.3 long tons; 20.5 short tons) and a length of 518 cm (204 in), was capable of firing stone balls of up to 63 cm (25 in) diameter.

Henry VIII reportedly had a set of 12, named after the Twelve Apostles, which were deployed at the sieges of Thérouanne and Tournai during his 1513 campaign in France.

The Tsar Cannon, built in 1586 and today located on the grounds of the Moscow Kremlin, is the largest bombard ever built.

Eventually bombards were superseded by weapons using smaller calibre iron projectiles fired from longer barrels with more powerful gunpowder.

== Gallery ==
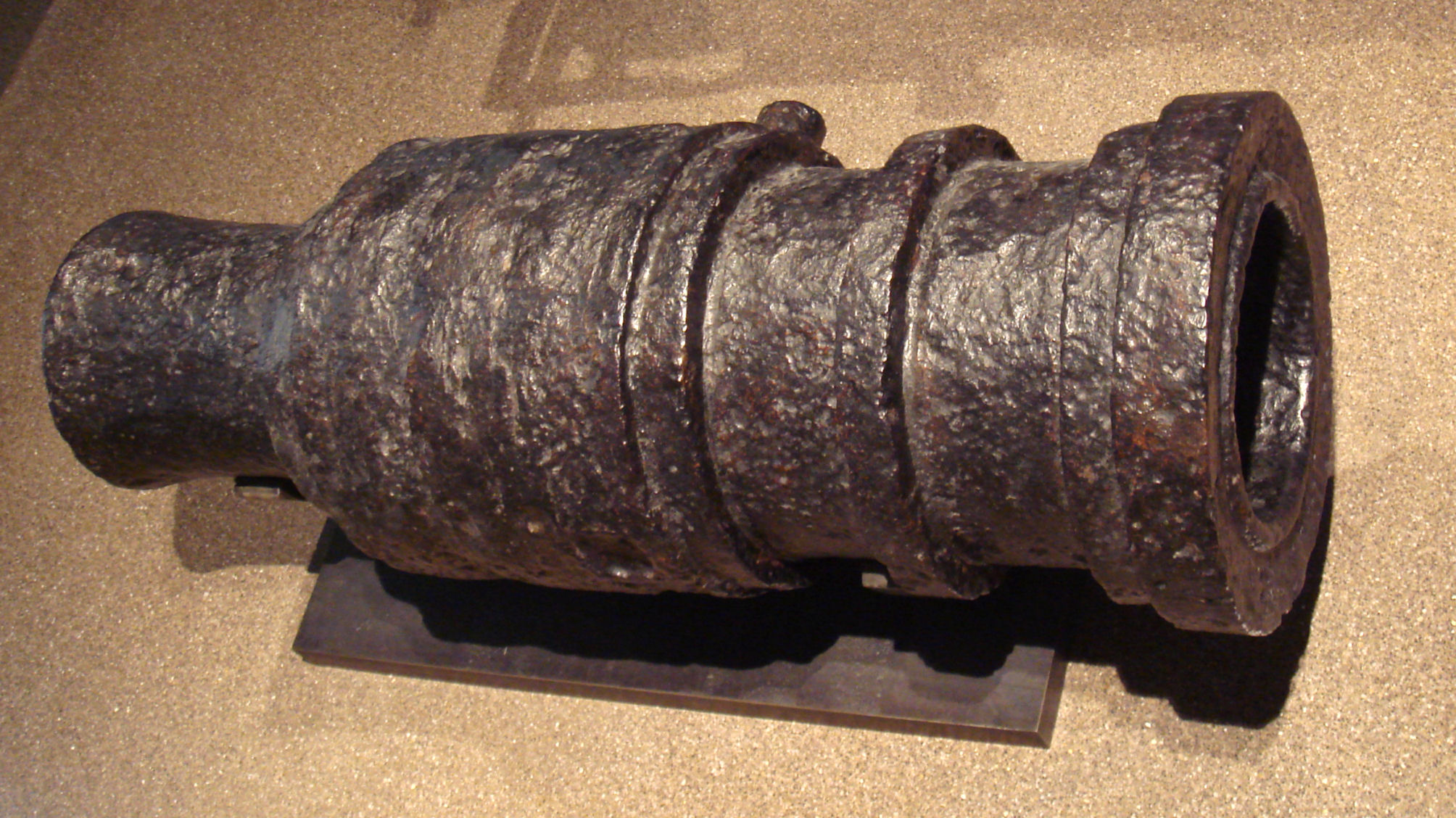
200 kg wrought iron bombard, circa 1450, Metz, present-day France. It was manufactured by forging together iron bars, held in place by iron rings. It fired 6 kg stone balls. Length: 82 cm.

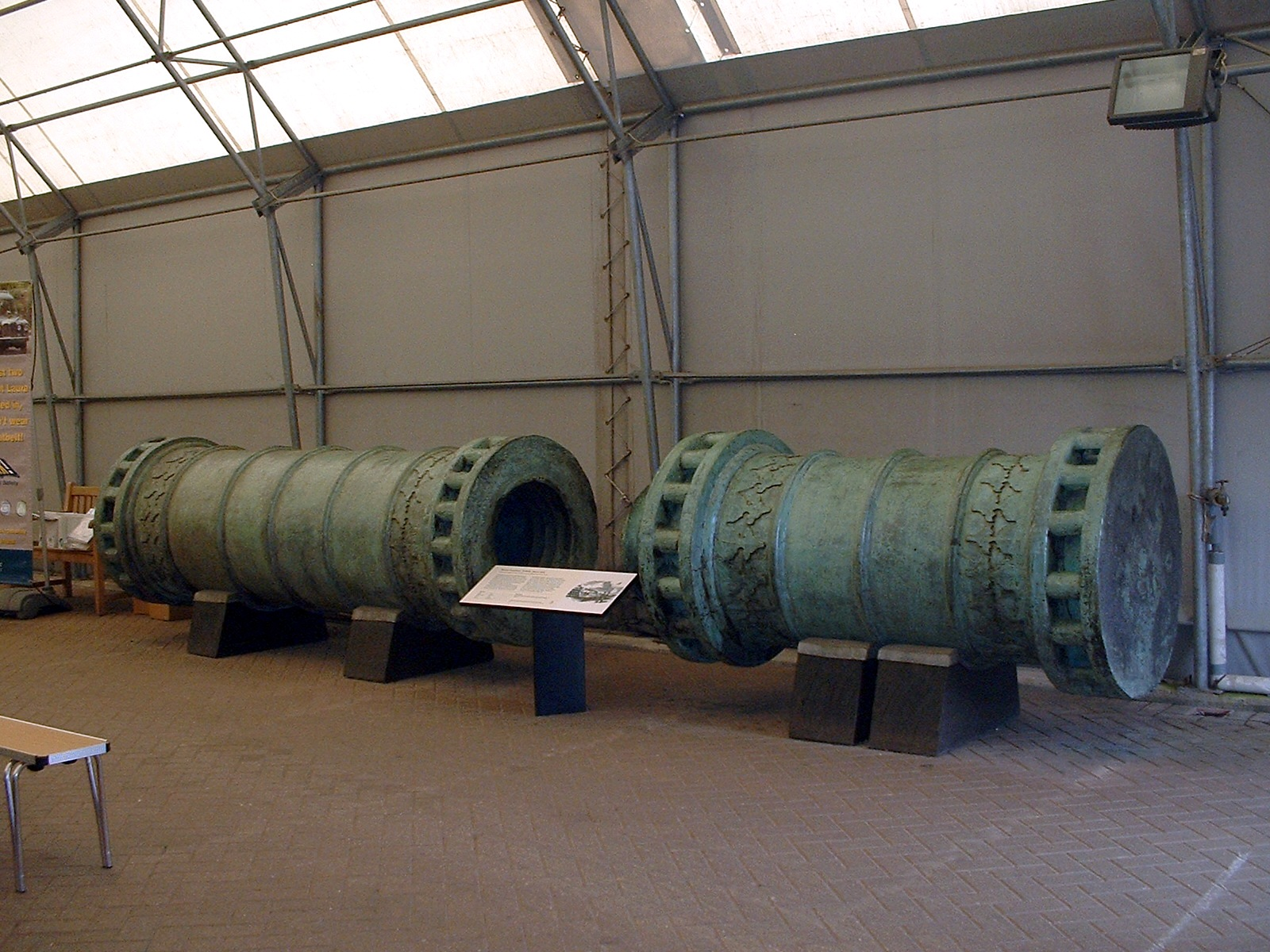
The Dardanelles Gun

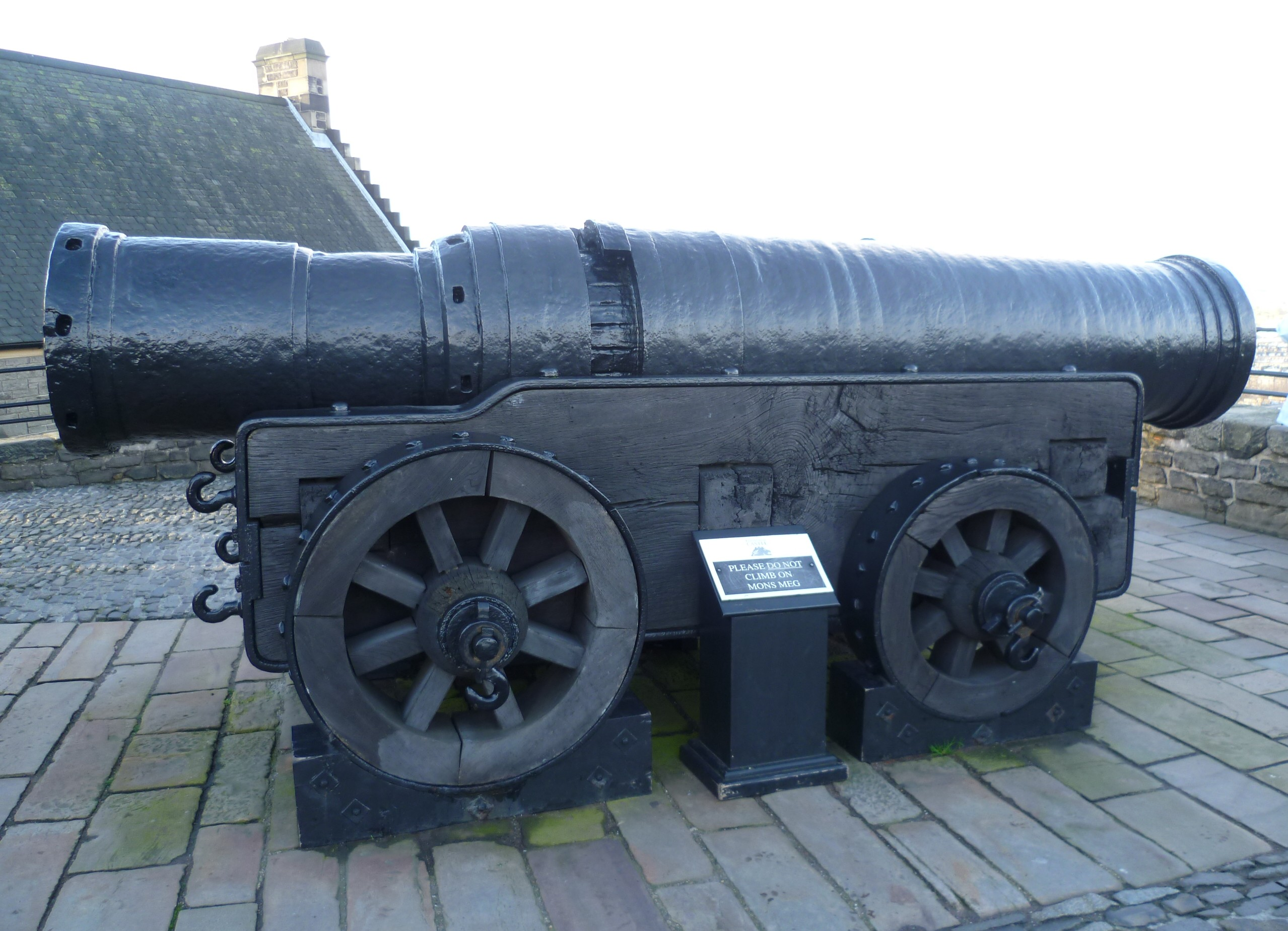
Mons Meg at Edinburgh Castle, mid-15th century

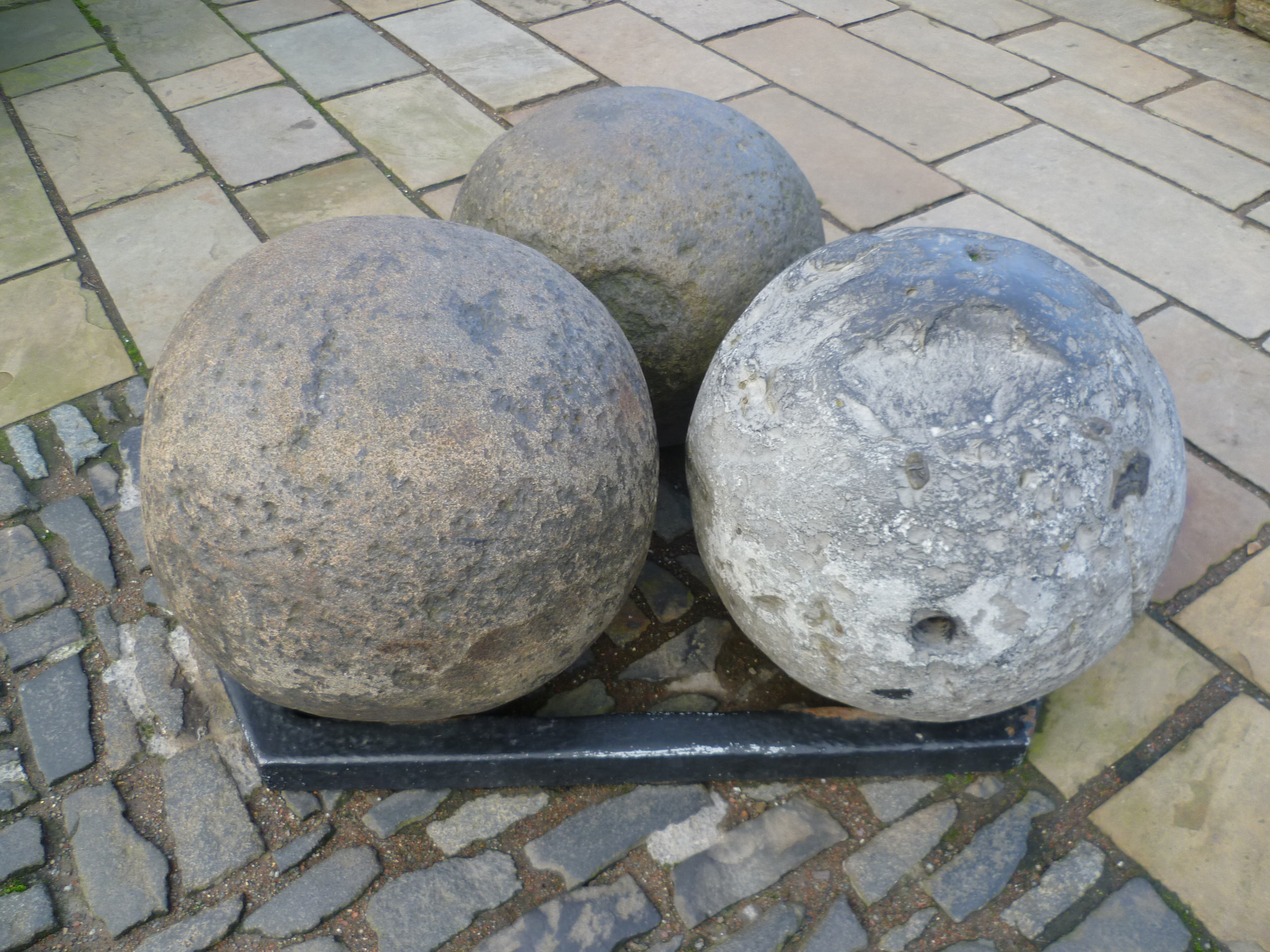
Mons Meg cannonballs

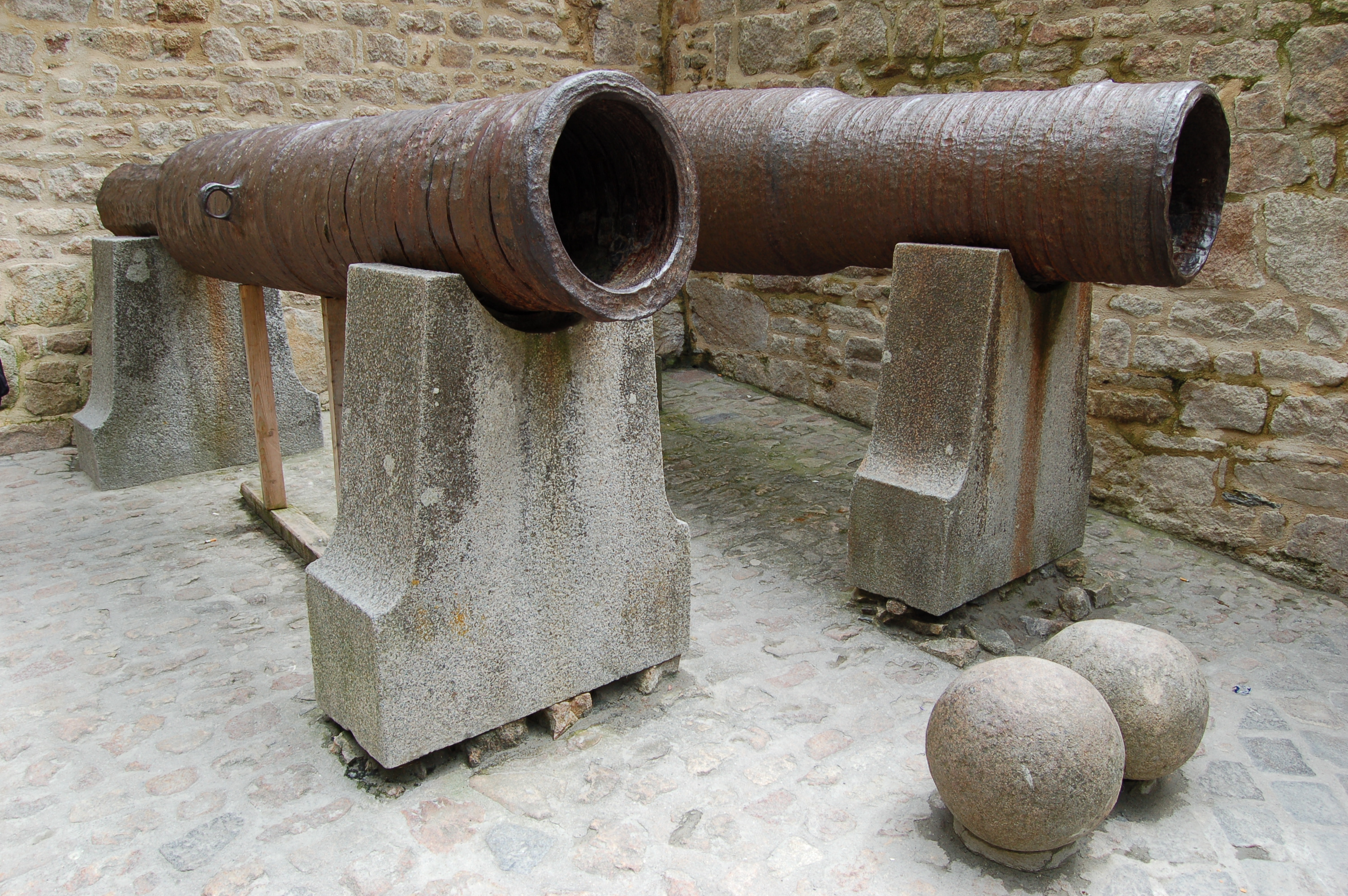
English Bombards abandoned during the Hundred Years' War and now displayed at Mont-Saint-Michel

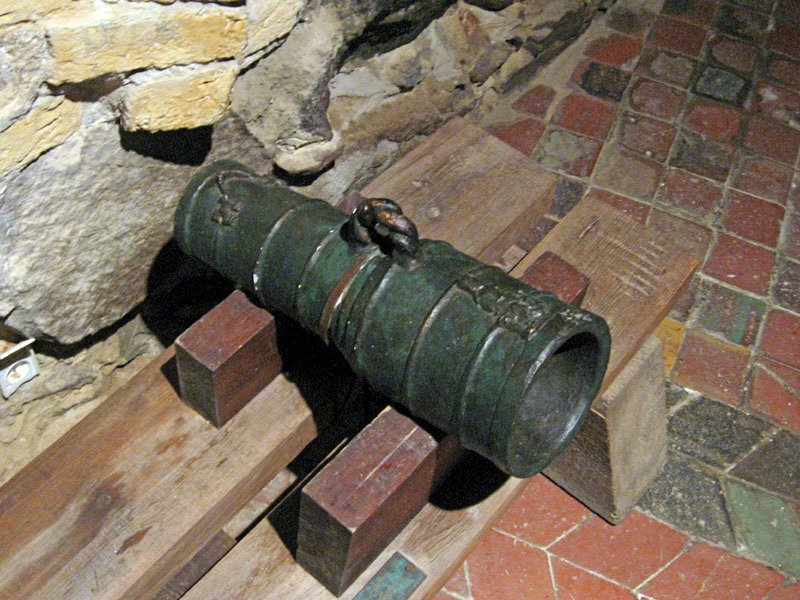
Bombard from the beginning of the 15th century, the only surviving bombard used by the Teutonic Knights, now displayed at Kwidzyn Castle

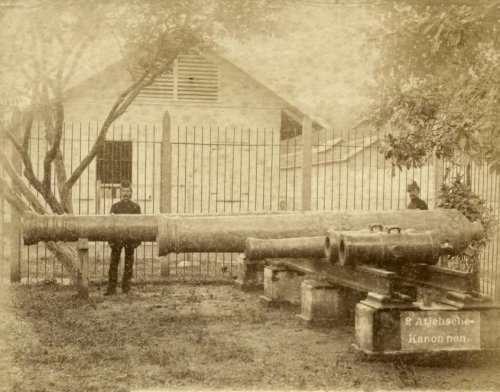
Acehnese guns including two bombards (closer to the camera)

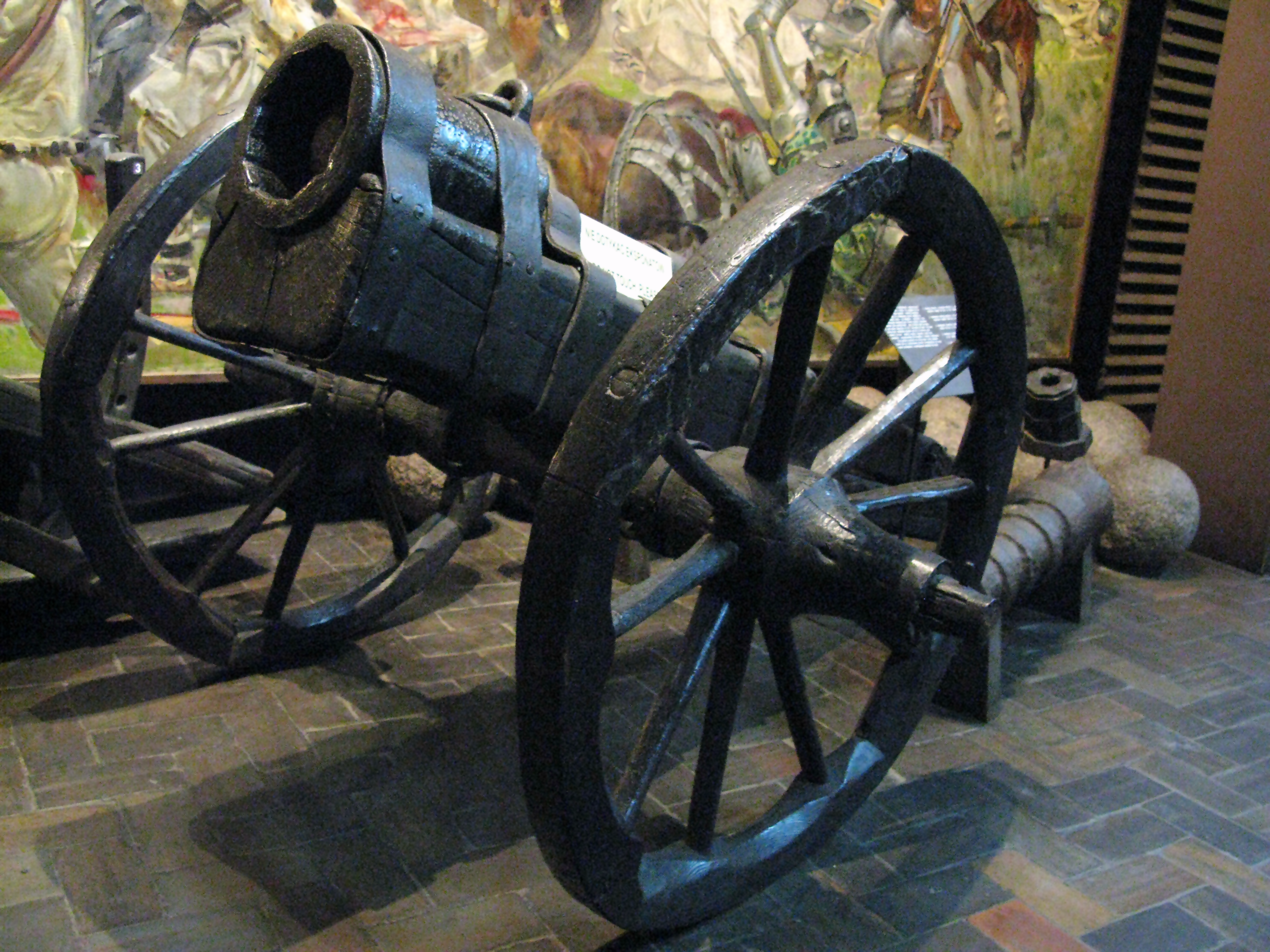
15th-century bombard mounted on a carriage, Warsaw

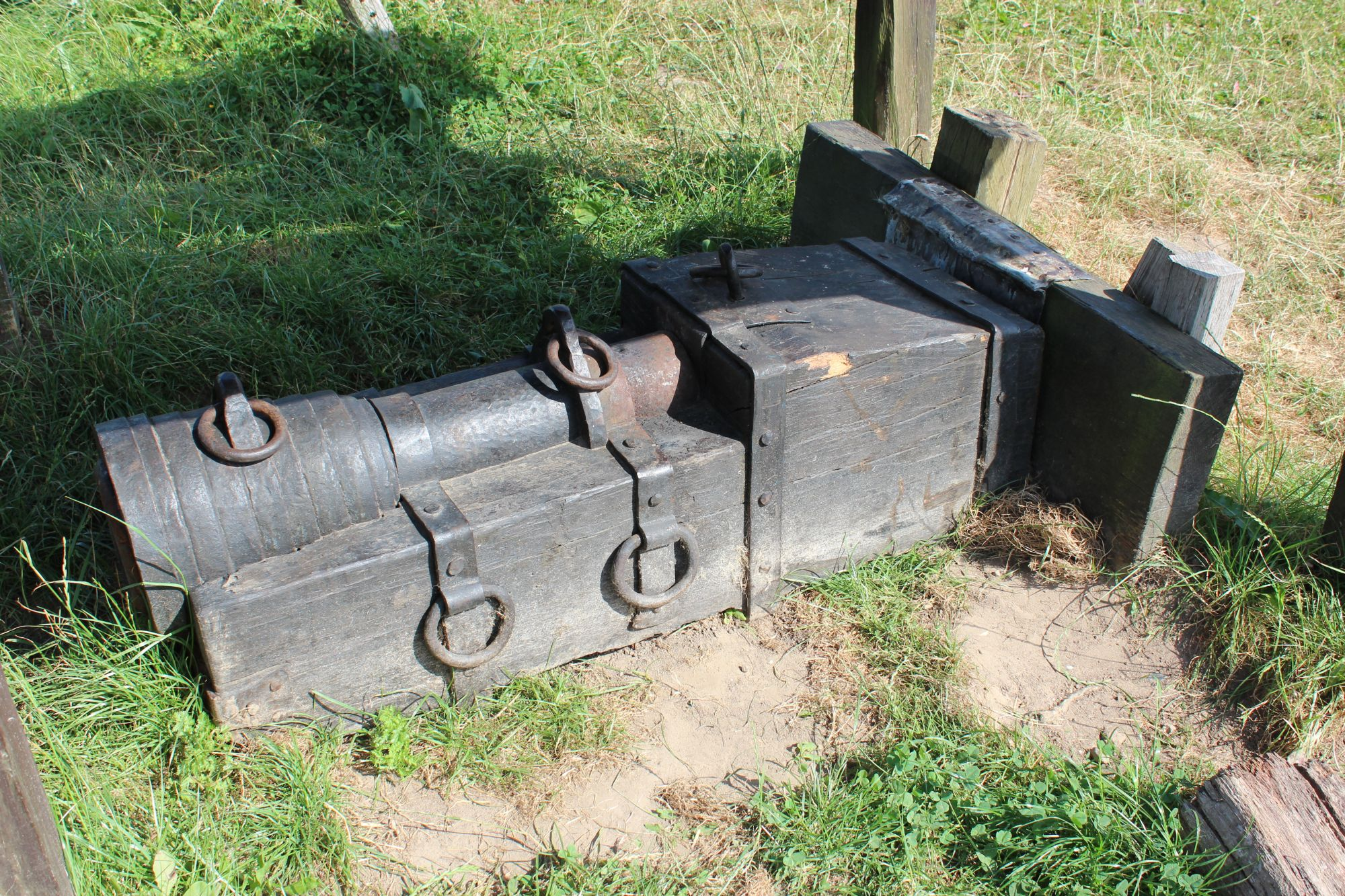
Bombard in its siege position, Denmark

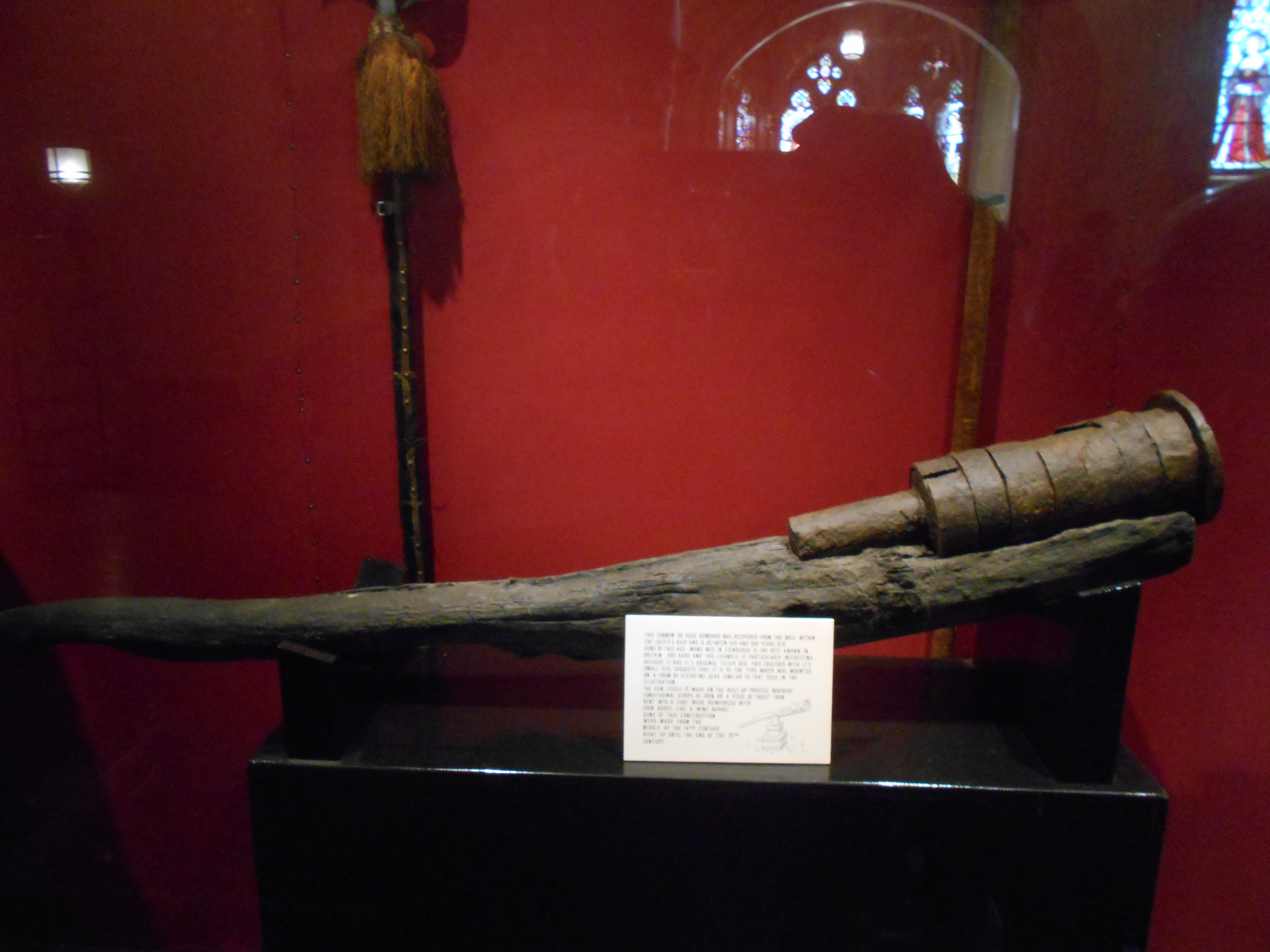
A bombard recovered from the well of Cardiff Castle, in swivel configuration

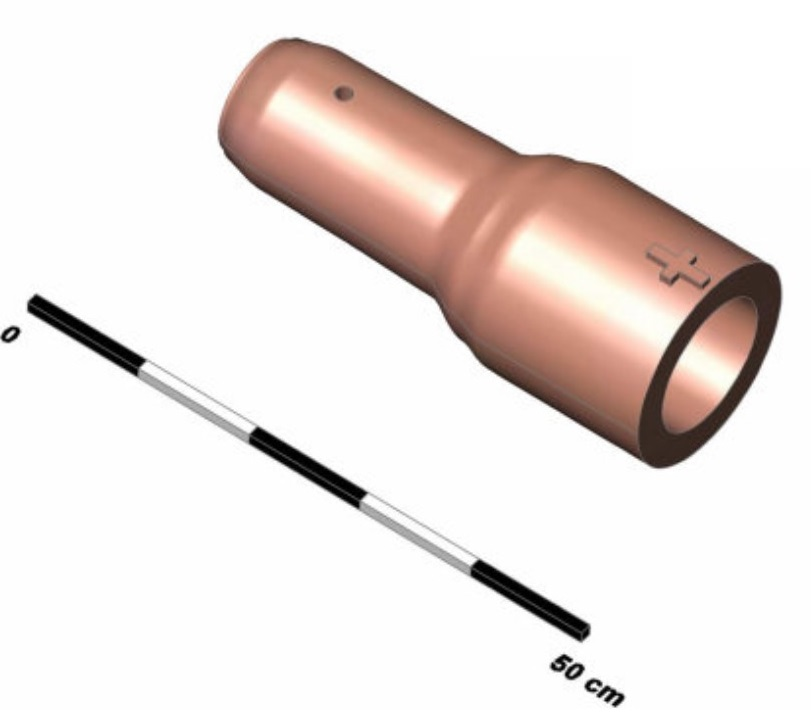
Hypothetical reconstruction of a copper alloy bombard found in Grodno, 4th quarter of the 14th century

== See also ==
- List of the largest cannons by caliber
