= Dulle Griet =

Coordinates: 51.0573°N 3.7241°E

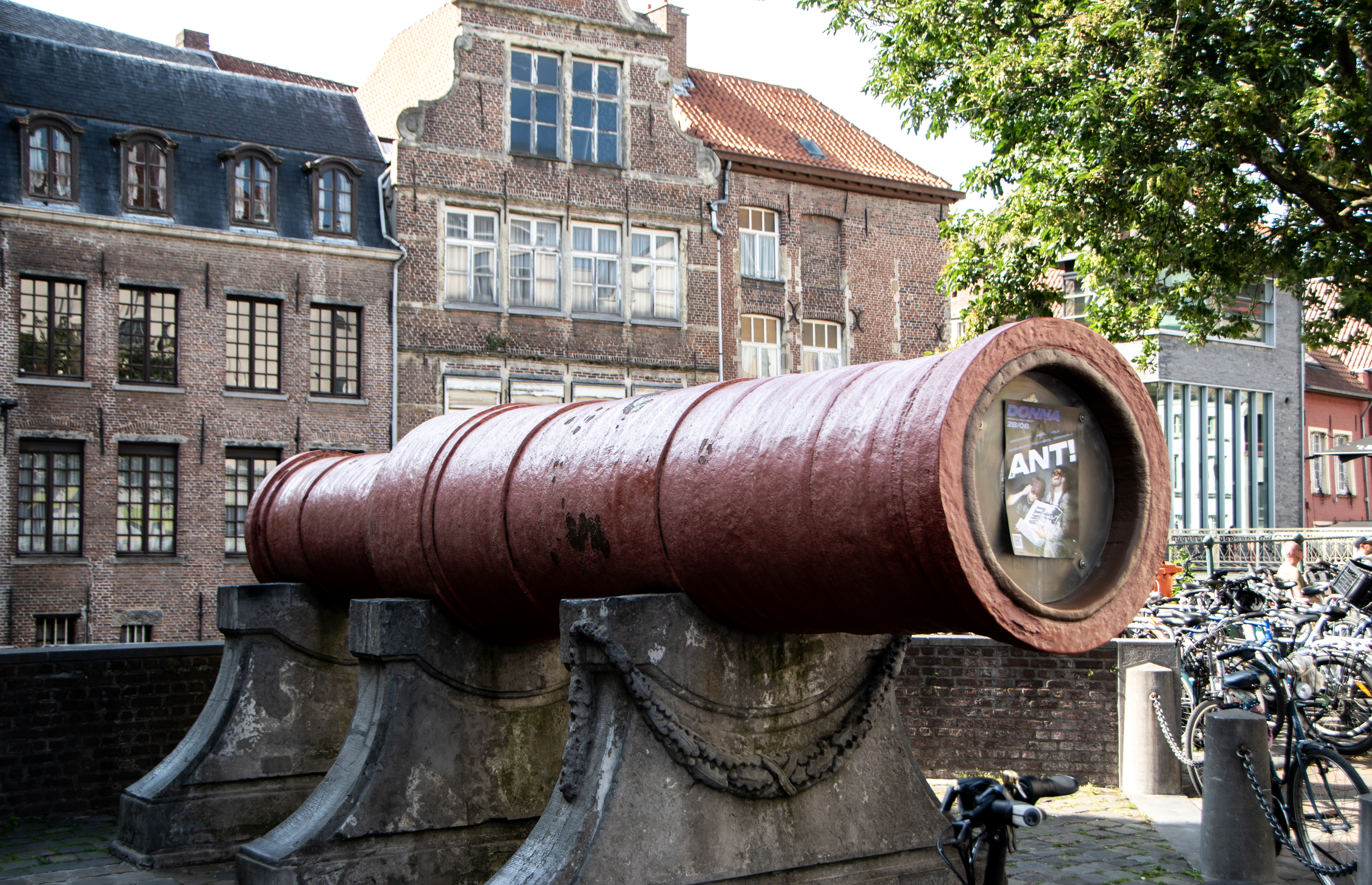
- The Dulle Griet at Ghent
- Type: Bombard
- Place of origin: Ghent, Bourgogne

Service history
- Used by: City of Ghent

Production history
- Designed: First half of the 15th century

Specifications
- Mass: c. 12.25 t (13.50 short tons; 27,000 lb)
- Length: 498 cm (196 in)
- Barrel length: 345 cm (136 in)
- Diameter: 90.5 cm (35.6 in) (maximum outer diameter)
- Shell weight: 340 kg (750 lb)
- Caliber: 64 cm (25 in) (ball diameter)

The Dulle Griet ("Mad Meg", named after the Flemish folklore figure Dull Gret) is a medieval large-calibre gun founded in Ghent.

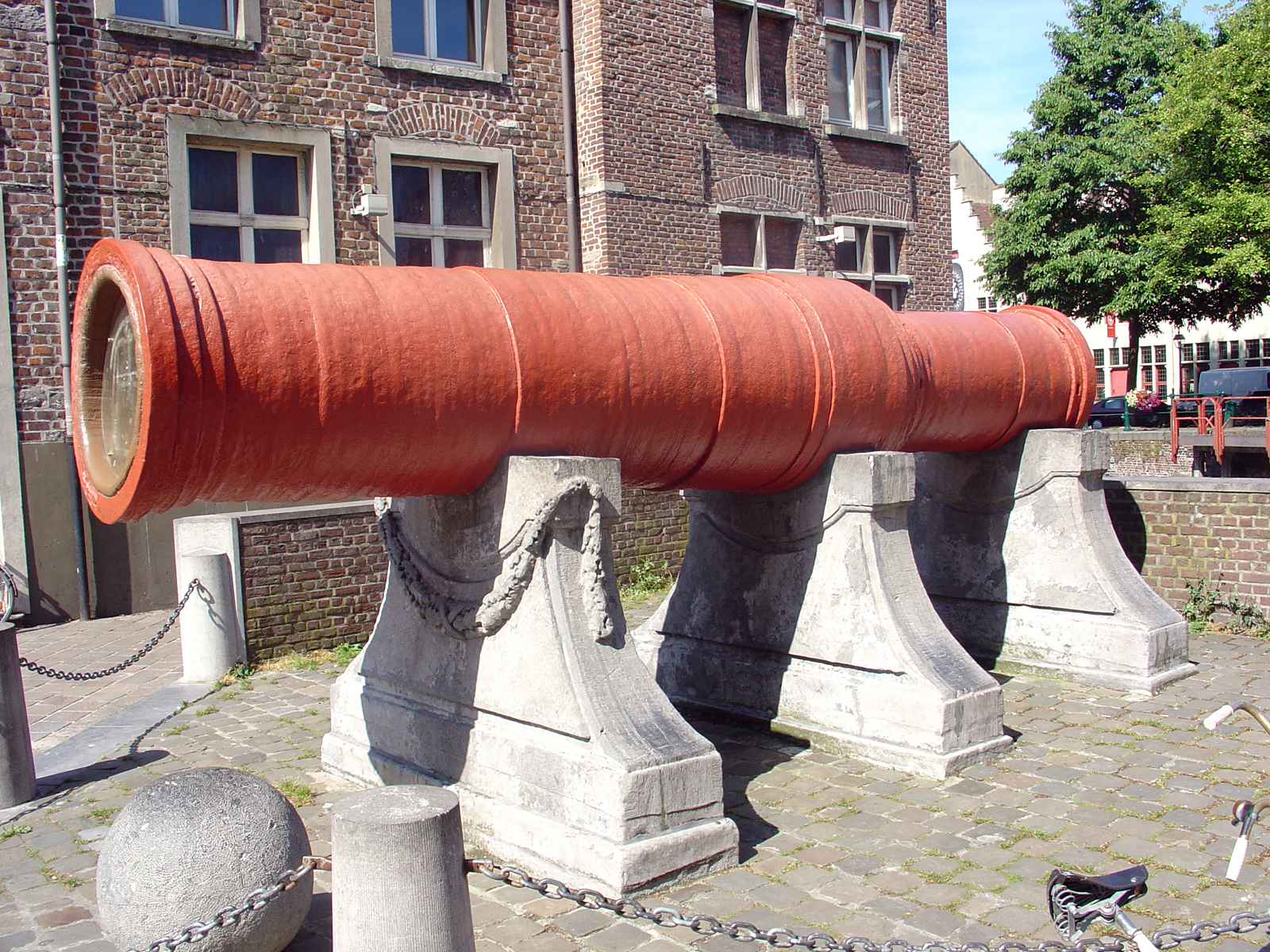
The Dulle Griet from the side

== History ==
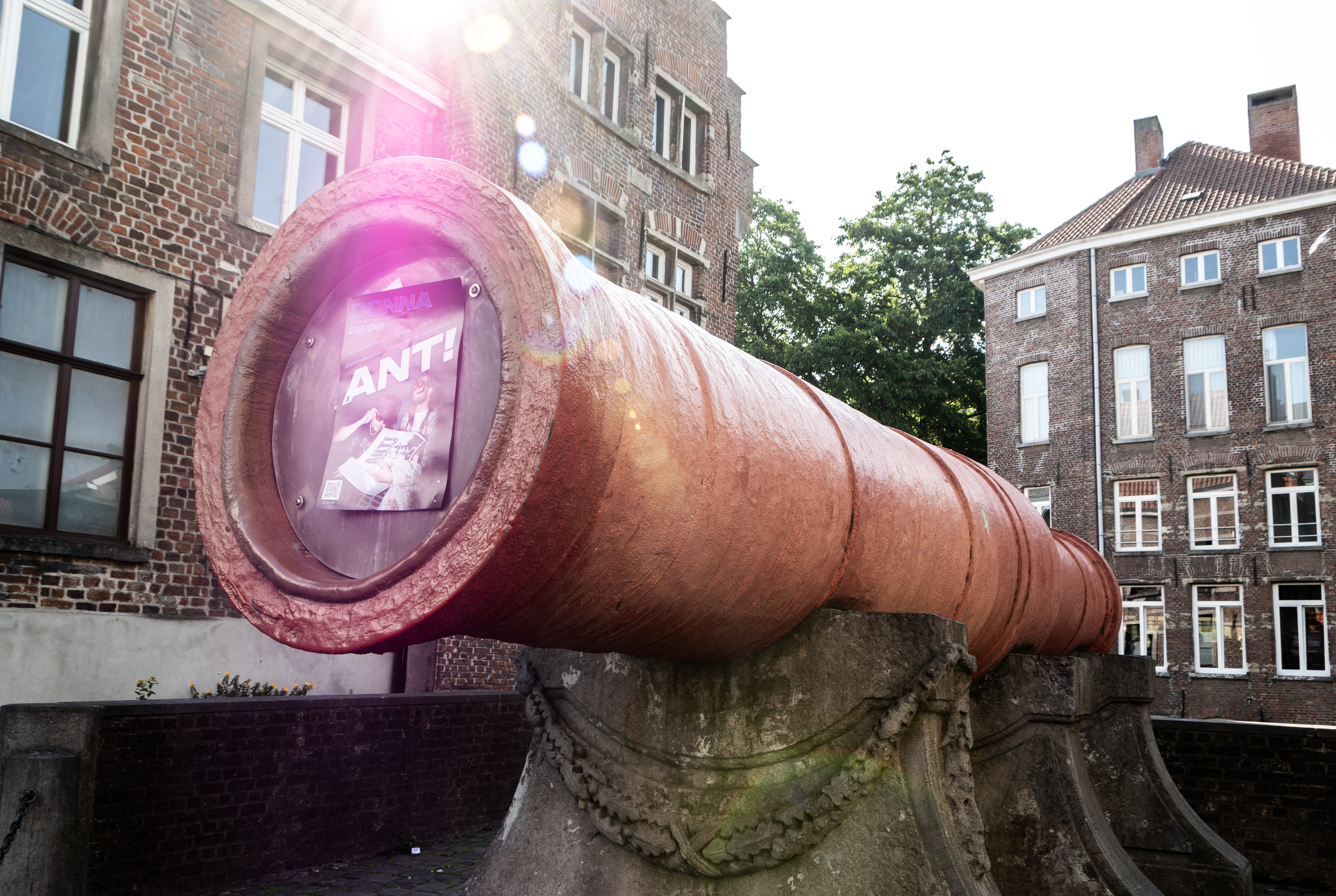
Closeup of the Dulle Griet, 2025

The "Dulle Griet" was a large-caliber cannon that belonged to Emperor Maximilian I. The bombard was forged in Flanders in the late 15th century and was capable of firing a 330 kg (730 lb) stone ball over a distance of several hundred yards. It was named after a legendary Flemish warrior woman known as "Dulle Griet", who was said to have used a large iron ball as a weapon.

Albert Manucy, in his book Artillery Through The Ages, writes about its capabilities: "Dulle Griet, the giant bombard of Ghent, had a 25-inch (64 cm) caliber and fired a 700-pound (320 kg) granite ball. It was built in 1382".

Maximilian I used the Dulle Griet in several military campaigns during his reign, including the Siege of Utrecht in 1483. The bombard was also used in ceremonial events, such as the entry of the Holy Roman Emperor into a newly conquered city.

Three cannons were founded: one resides now in Edinburgh Castle and is called "Mons Meg", and the last one was in France but has since been lost. The wrought-iron bombard was constructed in the first half of the 15th century from 32 longitudinal bars enclosed by 61 rings. In 1452, the bombard was employed by the city of Ghent in the Siege of Oudenaarde, but fell into the hands of the defenders on the retreat and was only returned to Ghent in 1578. Today, the bombard is set up close to the Friday Market square in the old town.

Besides the Dulle Griet, a number of 15th-century European superguns are known to have been employed primarily in siege warfare, including the wrought-iron Pumhart von Steyr and Mons Meg as well as the cast-bronze Faule Mette, Faule Grete and Grose Bochse.

== See also ==
- List of the largest cannon by caliber
