= Faule Mette =

Medieval German cannon

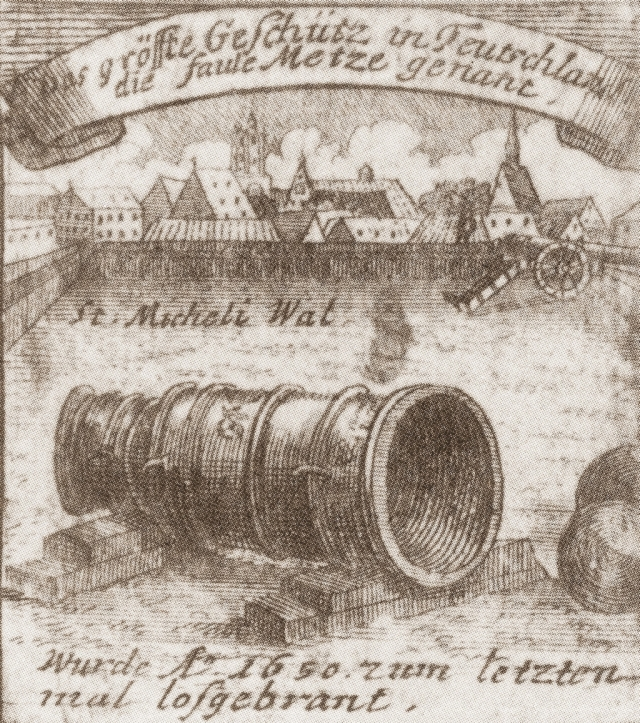
- Engraving by Johann Georg Beck from 1714. The upper banner runs: "The largest cannon of Germany, called the Faule Metze". The lower reads "[It] was fired for the last time in 1650".
- Type: Cannon
- Place of origin: Brunswick, Holy Roman Empire

Service history
- Used by: City of Brunswick

Production history
- Designer: Henning Bussenschutte
- Produced: 1411

Specifications
- Mass: 8.75 t
- Length: 305 cm
- Barrel length: 181 cm
- Shell weight: 409 kg
- Caliber: 67–80 cm (conical muzzle)

The Faule Mette (German for Lazy Mette, alluding to the gun's rare deployment, difficult mobility, and limited loading and fire rate) or Faule Metze was a medieval large-calibre cannon of the city of Brunswick, Germany.

Cast by the gunfounder Henning Bussenschutte on the central market square Kohlmarkt in 1411, it was fitted with a conically tapered muzzle (calibre of 67–80 cm) which allowed the use of projectiles of varying size. Thus, it could fire stone balls weighing between 322 and 423 kilograms (710 and 933 lb) with a gunpowder load ranging from 24 to 33 kilograms (53 to 73 lb).

On 1 November 1717, the Faule Mette reportedly shot a 341-kilogram (752 lb) stone ball 2,442 metres (8,012 ft). The cast-bronze cannon was melted down in 1787 and recast to several lighter field guns, having fired only twelve times in its history.

Besides the Faule Mette, a number of 15th-century European superguns are known to have been employed primarily in siege warfare, including the wrought-iron Pumhart von Steyr, Dulle Griet and Mons Meg as well as the cast-bronze Faule Grete and Grose Bochse.

== See also ==
- List of the largest cannon by caliber
