= Grose Bochse =

The Grose Bochse (old German for Große Büchse, "Big Gun") was a medieval large-calibre cannon of the Teutonic Order. It was cast from June to September 1408 in several pieces and was presumably assembled by a screw or plug connection. The cannon was even bigger than the slightly later finished Faule Grete and may have reached the dimensions of the largest known bombard by caliber, the Pumhart von Steyr.

Further known large-calibre weapons of the 15th century are the equally cast-bronze Faule Mette and the wrought-iron Dulle Griet and Mons Meg.
