= Malik-E-Maidan =

16th-century cannon in Bijapur, India

- Malik-E-Maidan
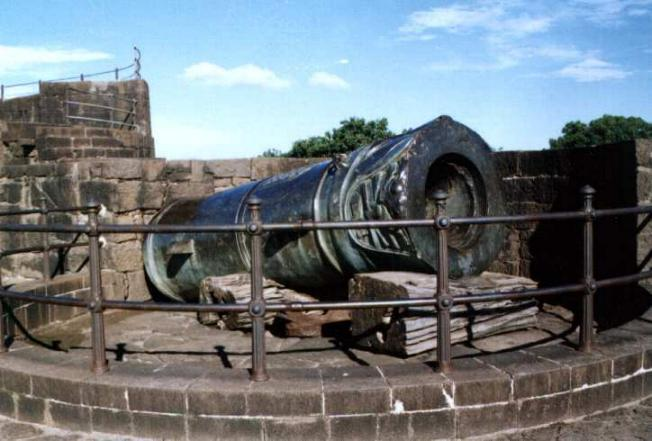
- A view of the Malik-E-Maidan Cannon, placed at Bijapur Fort.
- Interactive map of Malik-E-Maidan
- Location: Bijapur, India
- Coordinates: 16°49′54″N 75°42′32″E
- Designer: Muhammad Bin Husain Rumi
- Type: Cannon
- Material: Bell metal
- Length: 4.45 metres (14.6 ft)
- Completion date: 1549

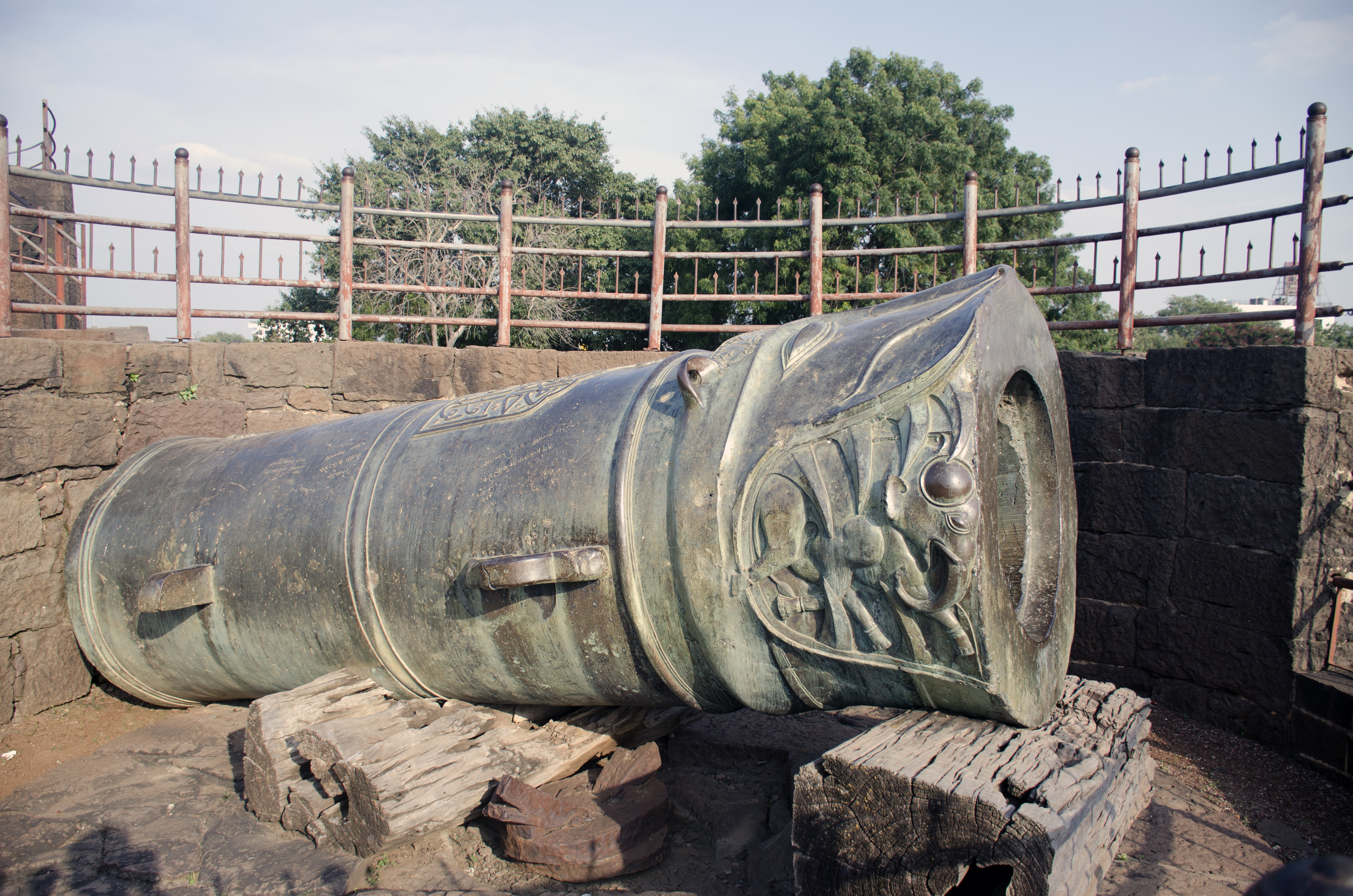
Malik e Maidan Cannon

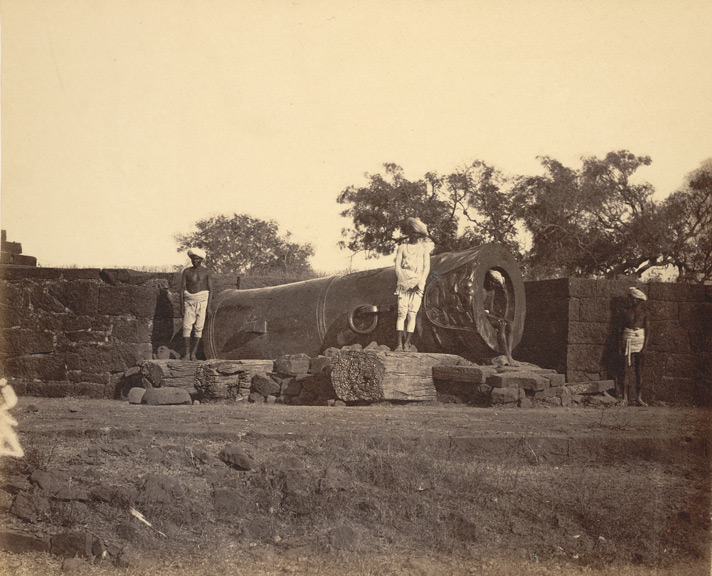
View of the Malik-i-Maidan gun position in 1865

The Malik-E-Maidan also Malik-i-Maidan (lit. 'Lord of the Battlefield'), is a 16th-century cannon, located at Burj-E-Sherz (Lion Tower), Bijapur Fort, Bijapur, India. At 4.45 metres (14.6 ft) in length and cast in bell metal, it is the largest surviving piece of artillery from the medieval period.

== History ==
The cannon was cast in 1549 by the Persian engineer Muhammad Bin Husain Rumi, then serving Sultan Burhan Nizam Shah I of Ahmednagar. The Sultan presented the cannon to his son-in-law, Sultan Ali Adil Shah I of Bijapur.

In 1565, the cannon was used in the Battle of Talikota by the Bijapur Sultan Ali Adil Shah I, attacking Aliya Rama Raya of the Vijayanagara Empire as part of the combined Deccan Sultanates force. After the victory of the Deccan Sultanates the cannon was named Malik-i-Maidan. At some point in the next 59 years, control of the cannon was transferred from the Bijapur Sultanate to the Ahmadnagar Sultanate.

In 1625, Prime Minister Malik Amber of the Ahmadnagar Sultanate transported the Malik–i-Maidan with the help of trained war elephants from Daulatabad Fort south to Sholapur, as part of his invasion of the Bijapur Sultanate. He would later transport the cannon north again, as he retreated after unsuccessfully besieging of the city of Bijapur, and subsequently used it in the Battle of Bhatvadi against the Mughals and Bijapur Sultanate.

Ownership of Malik–E-Maidan transferred briefly to the Mughal Empire after their successful conquest of the Ahmadnagar Sultanate in 1636. The cannon was then quickly transferred to the Bijapur Sultanate in May of that same year, as part of a peace treaty between Bijapur Sultan Mohammed Adil Shah and Mughal Emperor Shah Jahan I wherein the Mughal Empire granted former Ahmadnagar territory to the Bijapur Sultanate (which included the cannon). At some point thereafter, Malik-E-Maidan was transported to the Bijapur Fort.

After the conquest of the Bijapur Sultanate by the Mughal Empire in September 1686 at the Siege of Bijapur, Malik-E-Maidan came under Mughal control, but remained at Mughal-owned Fort Bijapur.

The fall of the Maratha Confederacy in 1818 led to Bijapur being controlled by the Satara State, until the Satara State lapsed into the British East India Company in 1848, along with Bijapur itself and Malik-E-Maidan. In 1854 the Commissioner of the Satara Territory (Note: Likely Commissioner H. B. E. Frere, as his predecessor Commissioner T. Oglivy died early in 1854) put up for sale "all the useless dead stock", including Malik–E-Maidan. The Mamlatdar for Satara petitioned the Commissioner to preserve the cannon, "stating in what veneration the gun was held" and noting that the highest bid at that time was only 150 rupees. The Commissioner agreed to retain the cannon.

The cannon, among the world's largest in its category, was attempted to be moved to Great Britain by the East India Company as a war trophy, but due to its huge size and un-conditioned transport infrastructure the cannon could not be transported.

== Structure ==
The Malik-e-Maidan is made of bell metal, measuring 4.45 metres (14.6 ft) in length, The muzzle gauge is 700 millimetres (28 in) and 1.5 metres (4 ft 11 in) in overall diameter, weighing 55 tons. According to legend, the cannonball could travel up to 500 metres (1,600 ft).

=== Decoration ===
The cannon's muzzle is decorated with a low relief of the head of a lion with its jaws open, swallowing an elephant.

=== Inscriptions ===
Three inscriptions can be found on the cannon, of which two were inscribed during Burhan Nizam Shah I of Ahmednagar as per the inscriptions. It was cast at Ahmadnagar from bell metal by Muhammad Bin Husain Rumi in 1549. The third inscription was added by Aurangzeb when he conquered Bijapur in 1685–86.

== See also ==
- List of the largest cannon by caliber
- Tsar Cannon
