= Mons Meg =

Famous medieval bombard

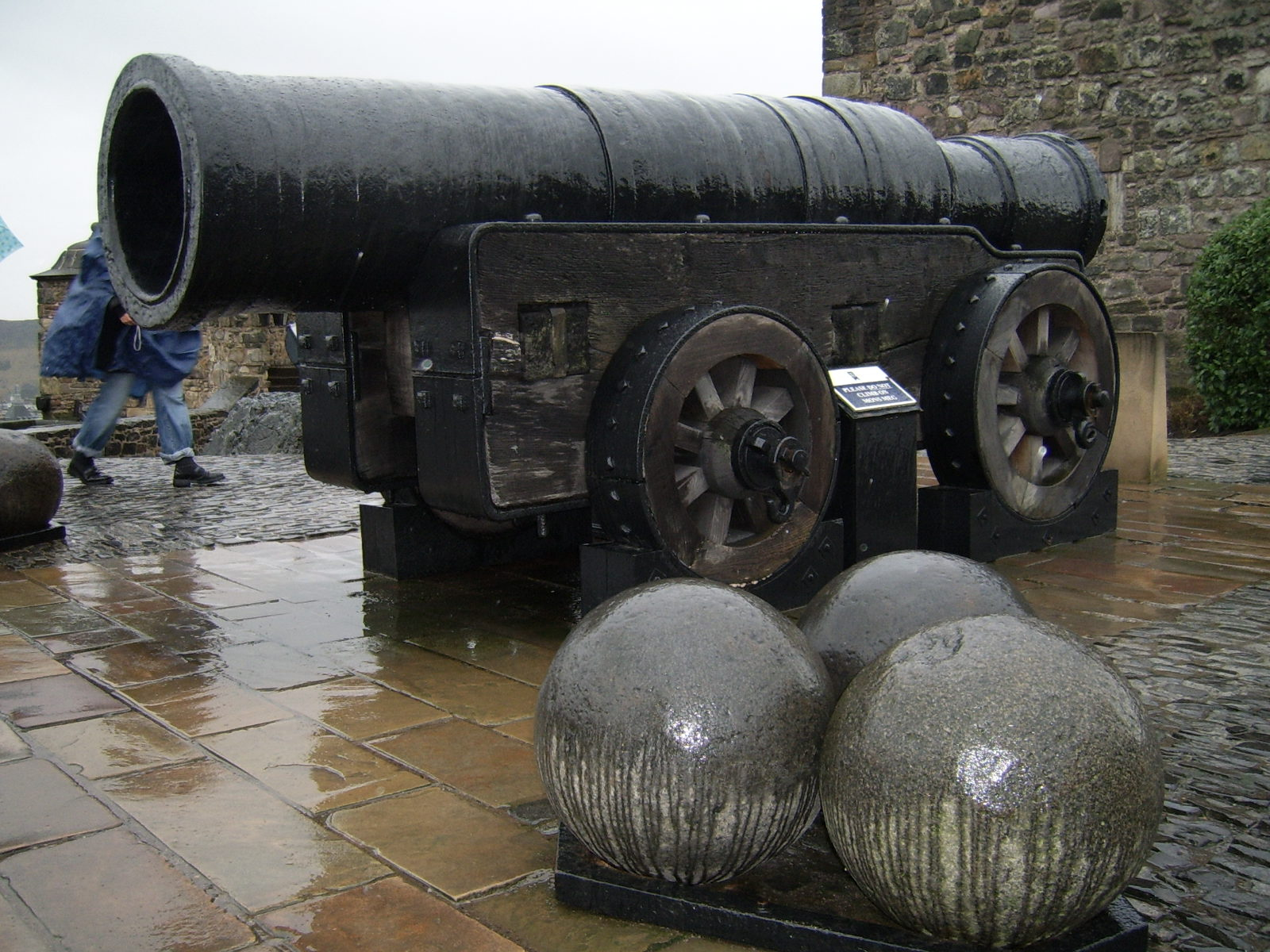
- Mons Meg with its 175-kilogram (386 lb) cannon balls
- Type: Cannon
- Place of origin: Mons, Hainault, Wallonia

Service history
- Used by: Kingdom of Scotland

Production history
- Designer: Jehan Cambier
- Produced: June 1449

Specifications
- Mass: 6.6 t
- Length: 406 cm
- Barrel length: 280 cm
- Diameter: 20 inches (510 mm)
- Shell weight: 175 kg

Mons Meg is a medieval bombard in the collection of the Royal Armouries, on loan to Historic Environment Scotland and located at Edinburgh Castle in Scotland. It has a barrel diameter of 20 inches (510 mm), making it one of the largest cannons in the world by calibre.

Mons Meg was built in 1449 on the orders of Philip the Good, Duke of Burgundy, and sent by him as a gift to James II, King of Scots, in 1454. The bombard was employed in sieges until the middle of the 16th century, after which it was only fired on ceremonial occasions. In 1680 the barrel burst, rendering Mons Meg unusable. The gun remained in Edinburgh Castle until 1754 when, along with other unused weapons in Scotland, it was taken to the Tower of London. Sir Walter Scott and others campaigned for its return, which was effected in 1829. Mons Meg has since been restored and is now on display within the castle.

== Construction ==
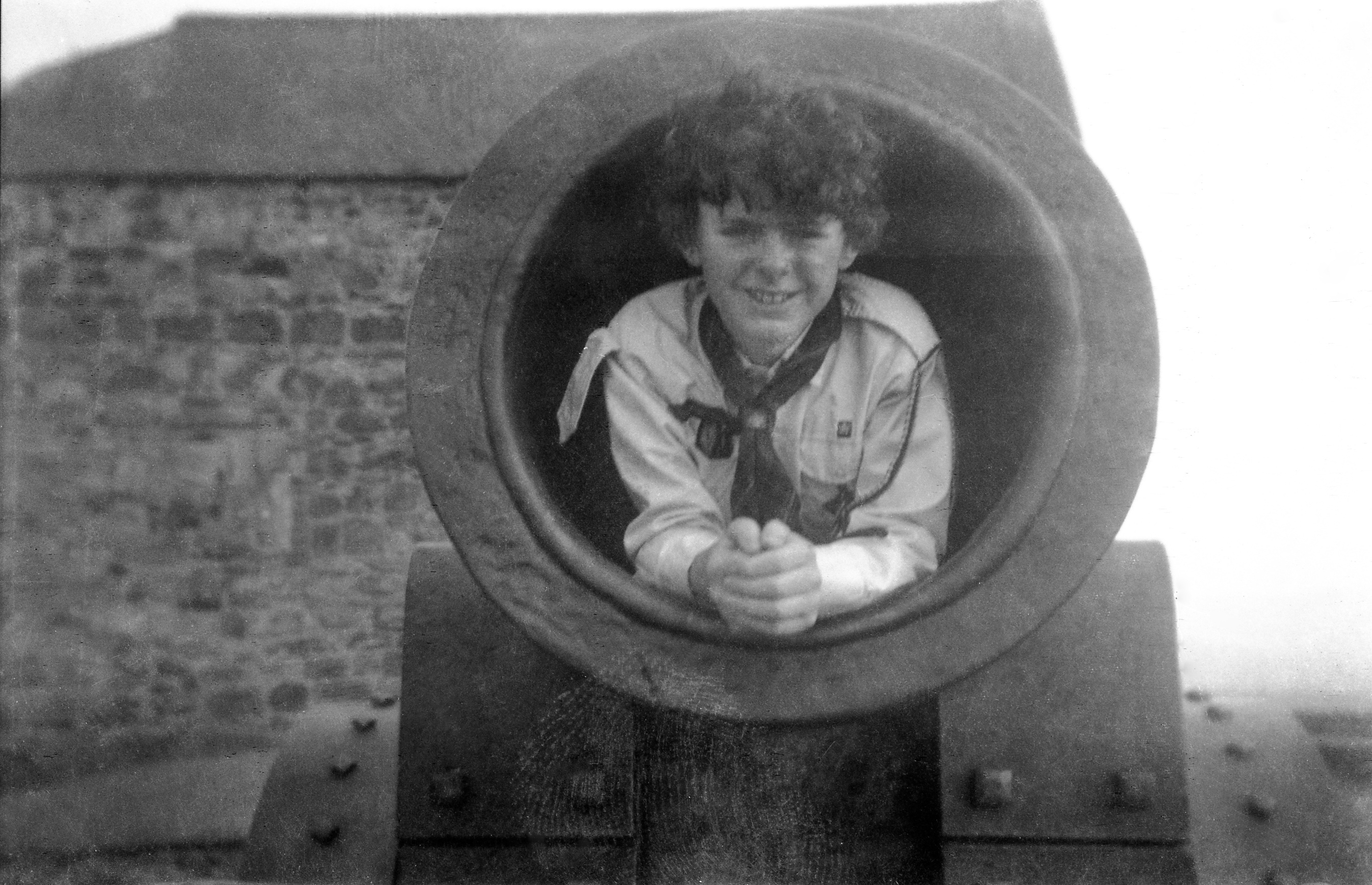
The bore (internal diameter) of the cannon is 50 cm (20 in), plenty wide enough to contain a child.

The bombard was manufactured from 25 longitudinal staves of iron, held together with iron hoops shrunk into place, to form one piece. A separate breech for loading is screw-fitted into the rear of the barrel. The barrel is attached to the powder chamber by means of a groove on the powder chamber into which lugs on the end of the barrel staves fit, and then bound permanently together by the hoops. The powder chamber itself is made from small pieces of iron hammer-welded together to make a solid wrought-iron forging. Mons Meg has a diameter of 19 inches (480 mm), one of the largest ever built, weighs 15,366 pounds (6,970 kg) and is 13 feet (4.0 m) in length.

== History ==
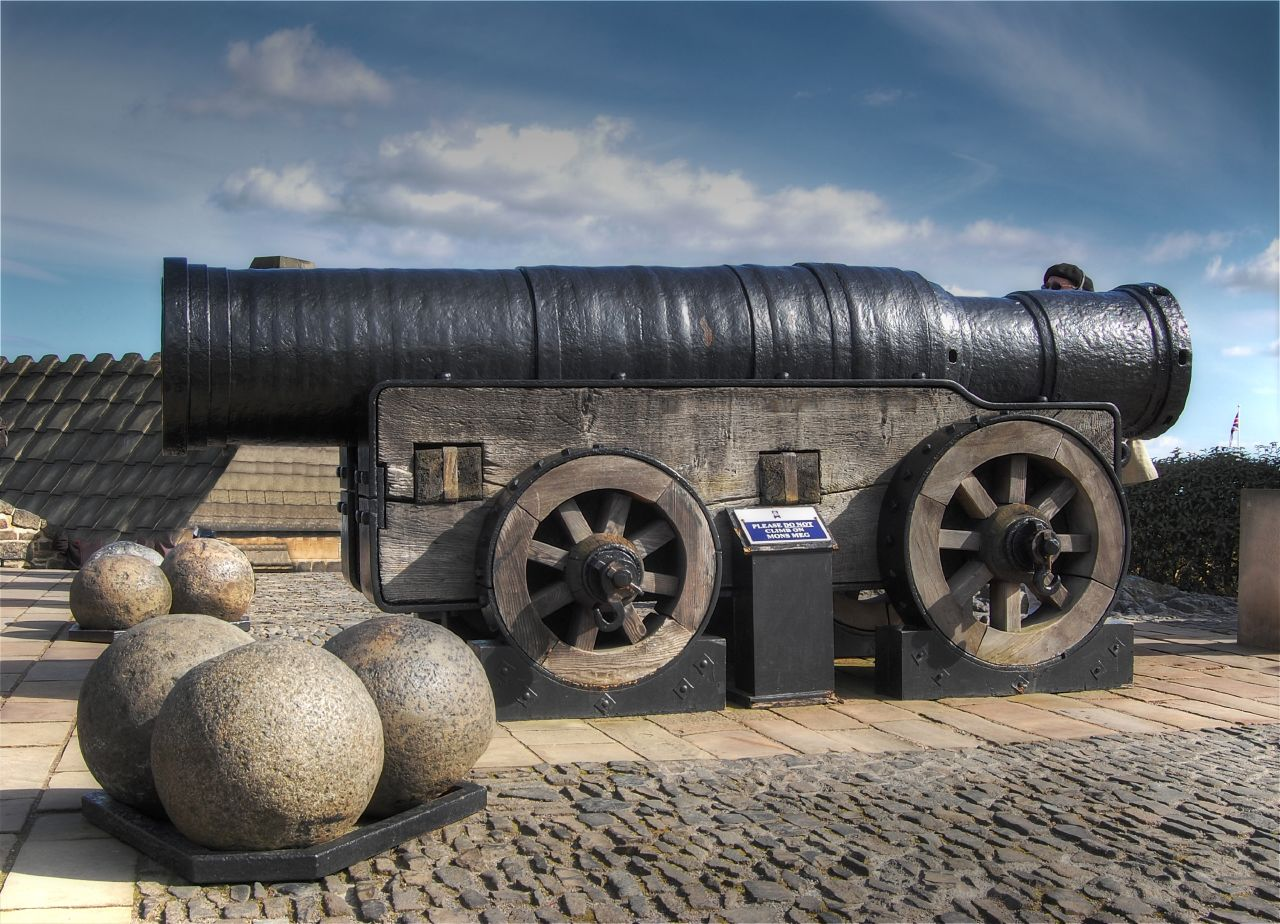
Side view. The oval slots in the breech were for levers to unscrew it from the barrel.

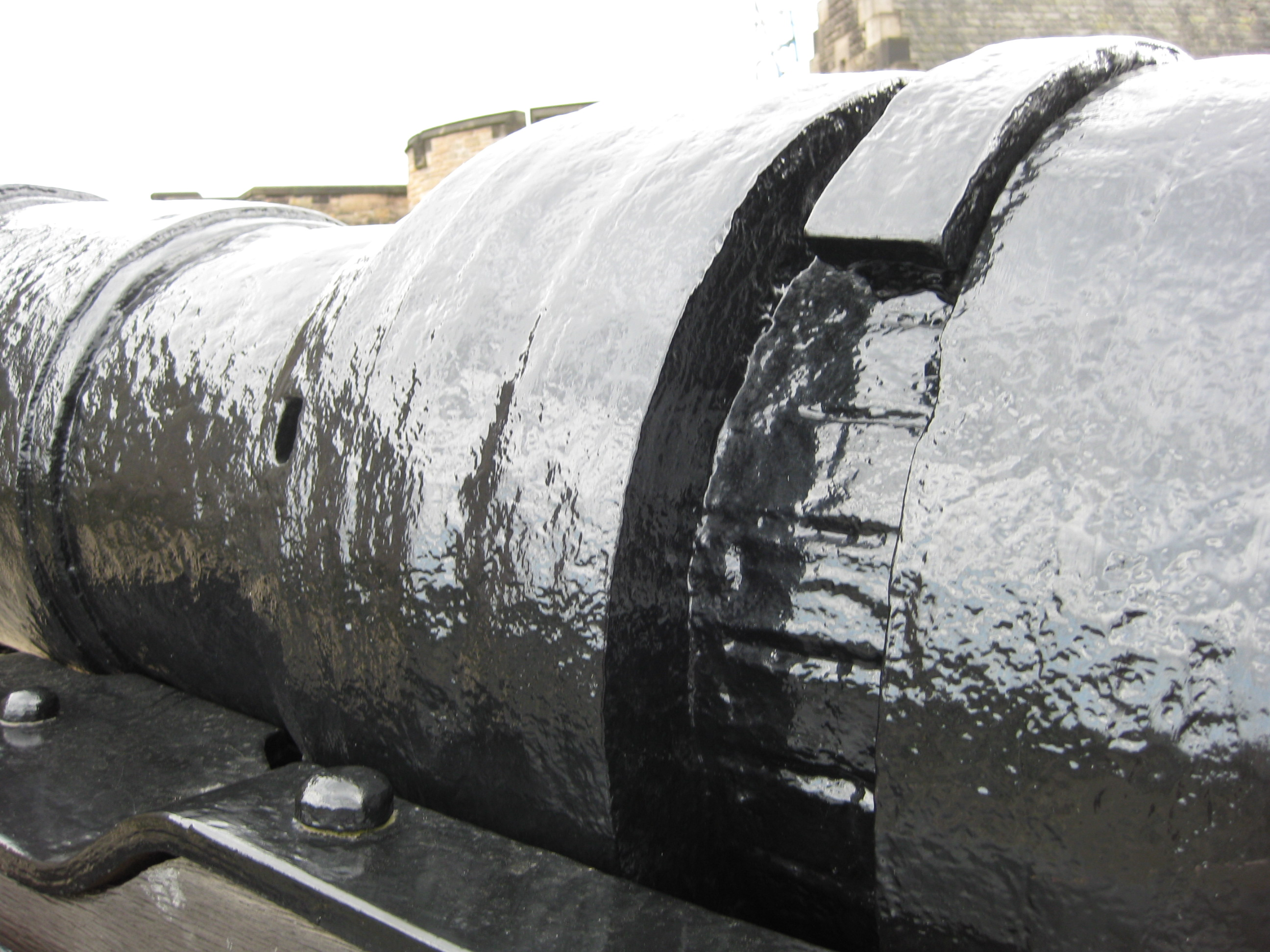
Burst iron ring which put the cannon out of use, revealing the iron staves forming the barrel

Mons Meg was constructed by Jehan Cambier, artillery maker to the Duke of Burgundy. It was tested at Mons in the County of Hainault in what is now Belgium, in June 1449; the duke did not take delivery of the Mons Meg until 1453. He gave the bombard to Scotland's King James II in 1457 as a sign of his support for the Scottish king, whose marriage he had helped negotiate.

An alternative legend about its manufacture is that it was built by a local blacksmith for the siege of Threave Castle in the Stewartry of Kirkcudbright. According to this tale, which was lent credence by Sir Walter Scott, when King James arrived at Threave to besiege the Earl of Douglas, the Clan MacLellan presented him with this bombard. The first shot fired is said to have passed clean through the castle, severing the hand of Margaret, Countess of Douglas, on the way. The gun was subsequently named after "Mollance", the lands given to the blacksmith for his service and "Meg", the name of his wife. Later historians have not taken this legend particularly seriously, not least because of the improbability that such a weapon could be forged by a village smith, as well as there being ample provenance showing its history.

The 20-inch-diameter (510 mm) cannon accepted stone balls that weighed 175 kilograms (386 lb). In April 1497, John Mawer elder, one of the castle gunners, made new wheels for Mons Meg and the bombards. The cannon was drawn down the Royal Mile to the sound of minstrels playing, placed on a new carriage or "cradle" and taken to assault Norham Castle in August 1497. Regent Albany brought Mons Meg to Stirling Castle in August 1515 to threaten Margaret Tudor, who kept her son James V of Scotland in the castle.

In early years the gun, like the other royal cannon, was painted with red lead to keep it from rusting, which cost 30 shillings in June 1539. From the 1540s Meg was retired from service and was fired only on ceremonial occasions from Edinburgh Castle. When it was fired on 3 July 1558, soldiers were paid to find and retrieve the shot from Wardie Muir, near the Firth of Forth, a distance of two miles. The salute marked the solemnisation of the marriage of Mary, Queen of Scots, to the French Dauphin.

The gun was fired on 30 October 1680 to celebrate a visit by James, Duke of Albany and York (later King James VII), but the barrel burst. An English cannoneer had loaded the charge and many Scots believed that the damage was done on purpose out of jealousy, because the English had no cannon as big as this. The incident was also seen as a bad omen for the future King.

The cannon was left outside Foog's Gate at Edinburgh Castle. It was next taken, with other disused ordnance, to the Tower of London in 1754, as a result of the disarming acts against Jacobites aimed at removing weapons or spare cannon from the reach of rebellious folk. It was returned to the castle in 1829 by order of George IV after a series of campaigns by Sir Walter Scott and the Society of Antiquaries of Scotland. Following a restoration, it sits outside St Margaret's Chapel. During Edinburgh's annual Hogmanay celebrations, Mons Meg is fired at the start of the firework display, although the effect is largely theatrical and the gun is not discharged.

Mons Meg was a large old-fashioned piece of ordnance, a great favourite with the Scottish common people; she was fabricated at Mons in Flanders, in the reign of James IV. or V. of Scotland. This gun figures frequently in the public accounts of the time, where we find charges for grease, to grease Meg's mouth withal (to increase, as every schoolboy knows, the loudness of the report), ribands to deck her carriage, and pipes to play before her when she was brought from the Castle to accompany the Scottish army on any distant expedition. After the Union, there was much popular apprehension that the Regalia of Scotland, and the subordinate Palladium, Mons Meg, would be carried to England to complete the odious surrender of national independence. The Regalia, sequestered from the sight of the public, were generally supposed to have been abstracted in this manner. As for Mons Meg, she remained in the Castle of Edinburgh, till, by order of the Board of Ordnance, she was actually removed to Woolwich about 1757. The Regalia, by his Majesty's special command, have been brought forth from their place of concealment in 1818, and exposed to the view of the people, by whom they must be looked upon with deep associations; and, in this very winter of 1828–9, Mons Meg has been restored to the country, where that, which in every other place or situation was a mere mass of rusty iron, becomes once more a curious monument of antiquity.

— Notes to Rob Roy, Sir Walter Scott

=== Naming ===
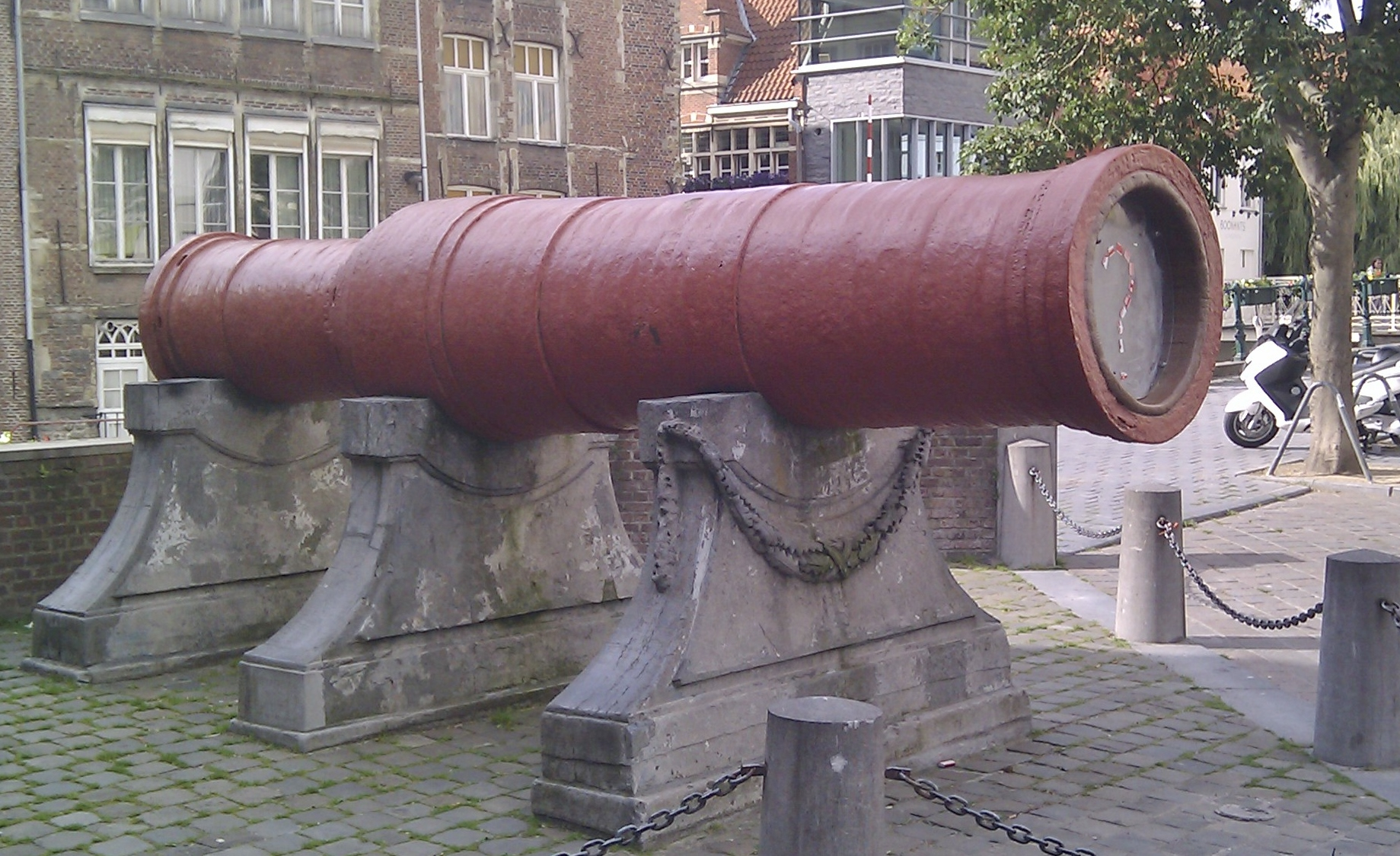
The Dulle Griet on display in Ghent

The gun is not called "Mons Meg" in any contemporary references until 1678. In 1489, she first appears in record as "Monss" and in the painter's account of 1539 she is called; "Monce in the castell", the only piece with an individual name. In 1650 she was noted as "Muckle Meg". "Meg" may either be a reference to Margaret of Denmark, queen of James III of Scotland, or simply an alliteration, while Mons was one of the locations where the cannon was tested. McKenzie records that this class of artillery was known as a murderer and Mons Meg was certainly described as such. Mons Meg was made in the town of Mons (now the Walloon French-speaking part of Belgium) or Bergen (in Dutch as in those days it was part of Flanders). Three cannons were founded: one resides in Edinburgh, one in the Flemish town of Ghent at the Friday Market, and one in France (but that one disappeared ages ago). The one in Ghent can be visited today, undamaged. The cannon is named "Dulle Griet" which translates into "Mad Meg".

=== Evolution of the carriage ===
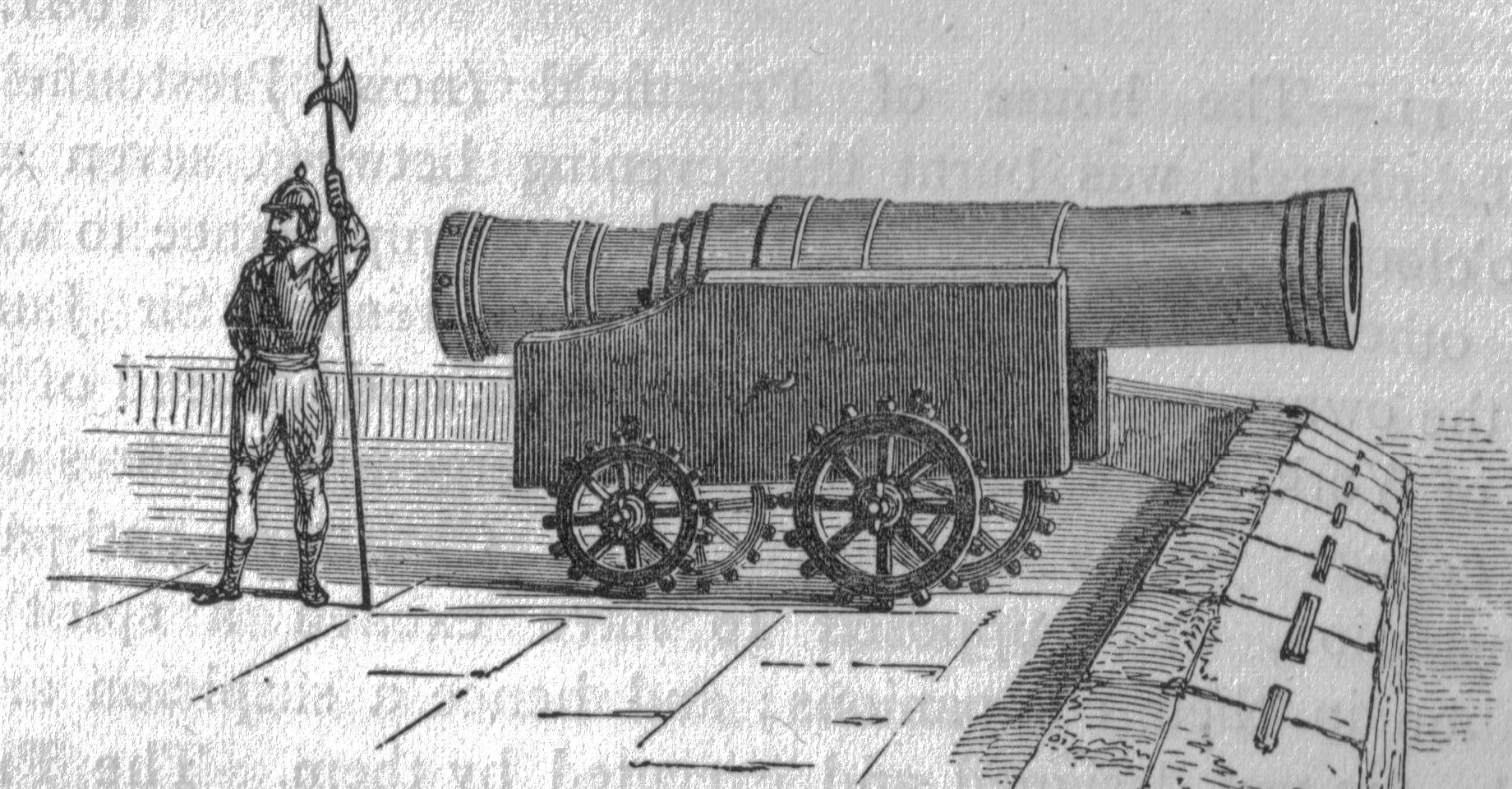
Engraving of Mons Meg at Edinburgh Castle in the 1680s, showing details of the carriage construction

For a while in its early days, the gun sat on a plain box without any wheels. Evidently, when Mons Meg was removed from Edinburgh Castle in 1754, its carriage had long since rotted away. A contemporary account describes her as lying "on the ground" near the innermost gate to the castle. Presumably the Ordnance Board fabricated a new carriage after her arrival at the Tower. In 1835, after the return of Mons Meg to Edinburgh Castle, the London-made carriage rotted away too and fabrication of a cast-iron replacement was undertaken; the new carriage weighed three-and-a-half tons and cost £53. Mons Meg is now mounted on a reproduction of the carriage depicted in a carving of c. 1500 on a wall of Edinburgh Castle, built in 1934 at a cost of £178 and paid for by the Lord Provost of Edinburgh.

== See also ==
- List of the largest cannon by caliber

== Sources ==
- Gaier, Claude (1967) The Origin of Mons Meg. Journal of the Arms and Armour Society London V(12) 425–431
- Grose, Francis (1801) Military Antiquities respecting a History of the English Army from the Conquest to the Present Time. T. Egerton and G. Kearsley London, UK
- Hewitt, J (1853) Mons Meg the ancient bombard, preserved at Edinburgh castle. Archeological Journal 10 25–32
- Lead, Peter (1984) Mons Meg: A Royal Cannon. Mennock Publishing Cheshire, UK
- Lead, Peter (2021) Mons Meg - a symbol of Scotland. Catrine: Stenlake Publishing Ltd
- McKenzie, Agnes Mure (1948). Scottish Pageant 1513–1625. Edinburgh : Oliver & Boyd.
- Norris, John (2003) Early Gunpowder Artillery 1300–1600 Motorbooks International
- Paul, James Balfour, Sir (1915–1916) Ancient Artillery. With Some Notes on Mons Meg. Proceedings of the Society of Antiquaries of Scotland 50 191–201
- Sands, Kathleen (1999) Though one of the best-documented of medieval bombards, Mons Meg was the subject of exaggeration and legend Military History. 16(3) 22–23
- Scott, Walter, Sir (1817) Waverley Novels, Rob Roy (Notes G) Edinburgh
- Schmidtchen, Volker (1977), "Riesengeschütze des 15. Jahrhunderts. Technische Höchstleistungen ihrer Zeit", Technikgeschichte, 44 (2): 153–173 (166–168)
- Smith, Robert D and Brown, Ruth Rhynas Bombards- Mons Meg and her sisters Royal Armouries Monograph 1 ISBN 0-948092-09-2
